= Cinema of Romania =

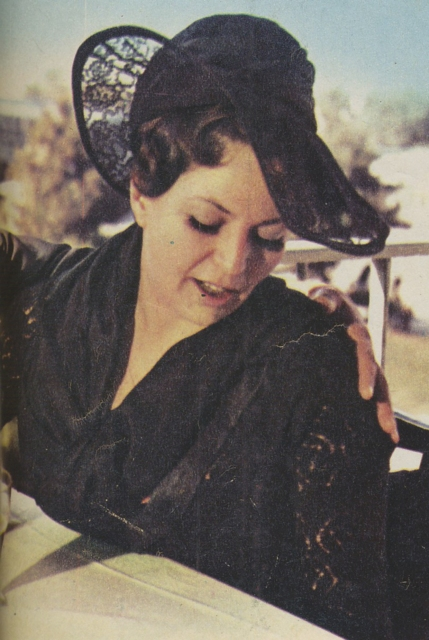
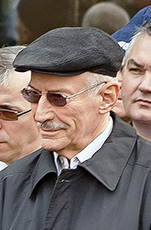
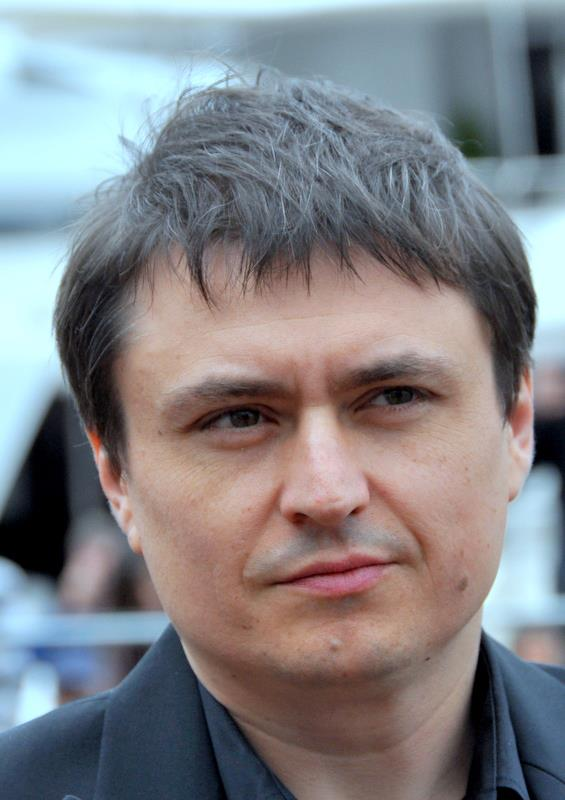
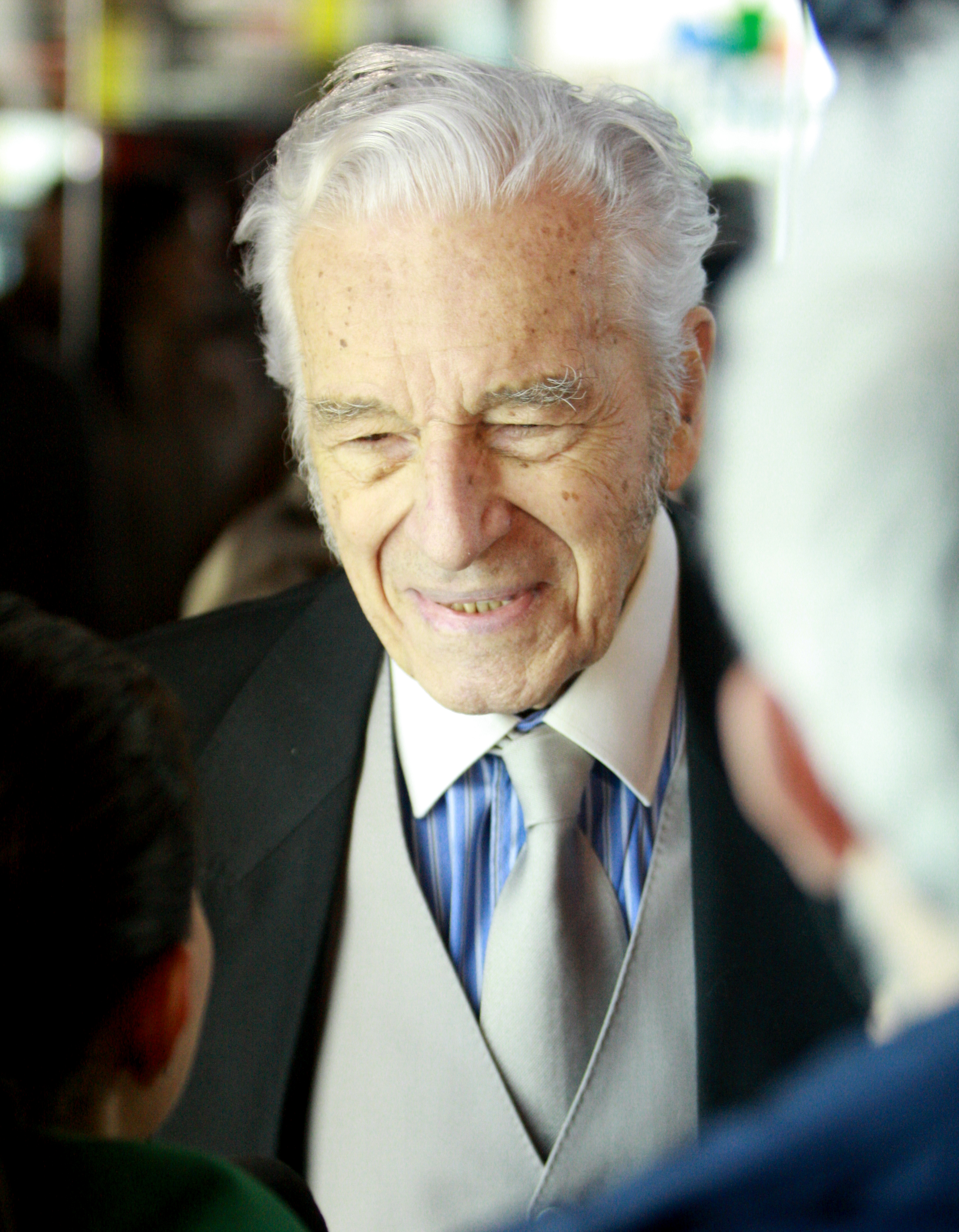
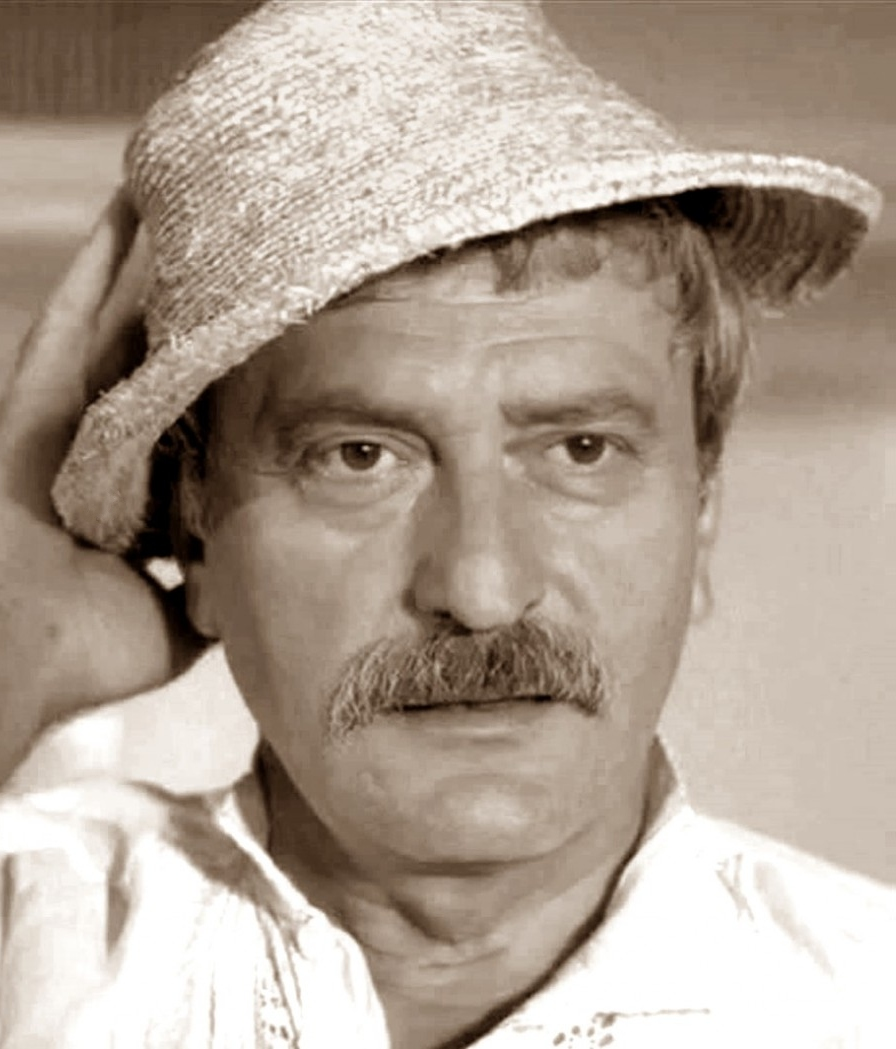
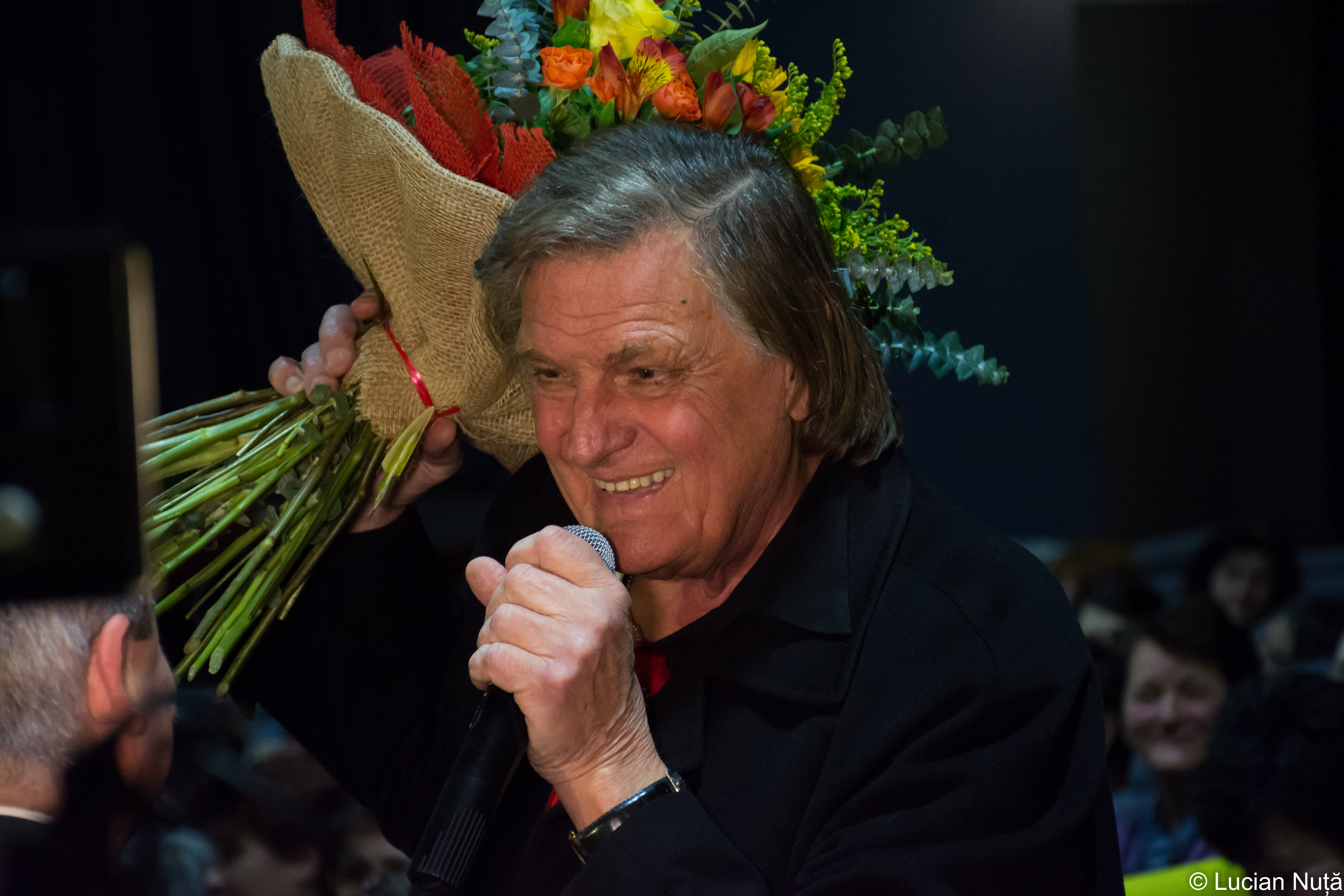
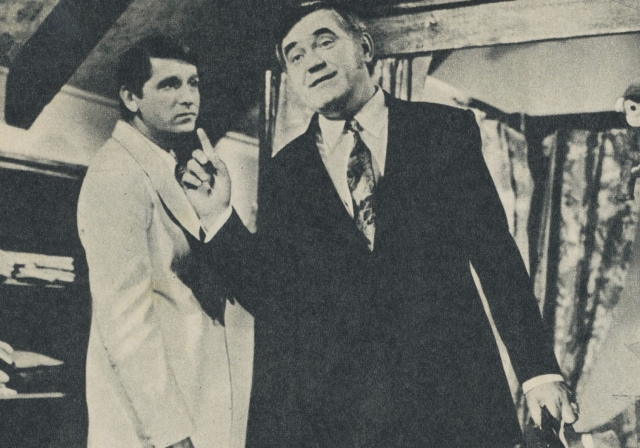
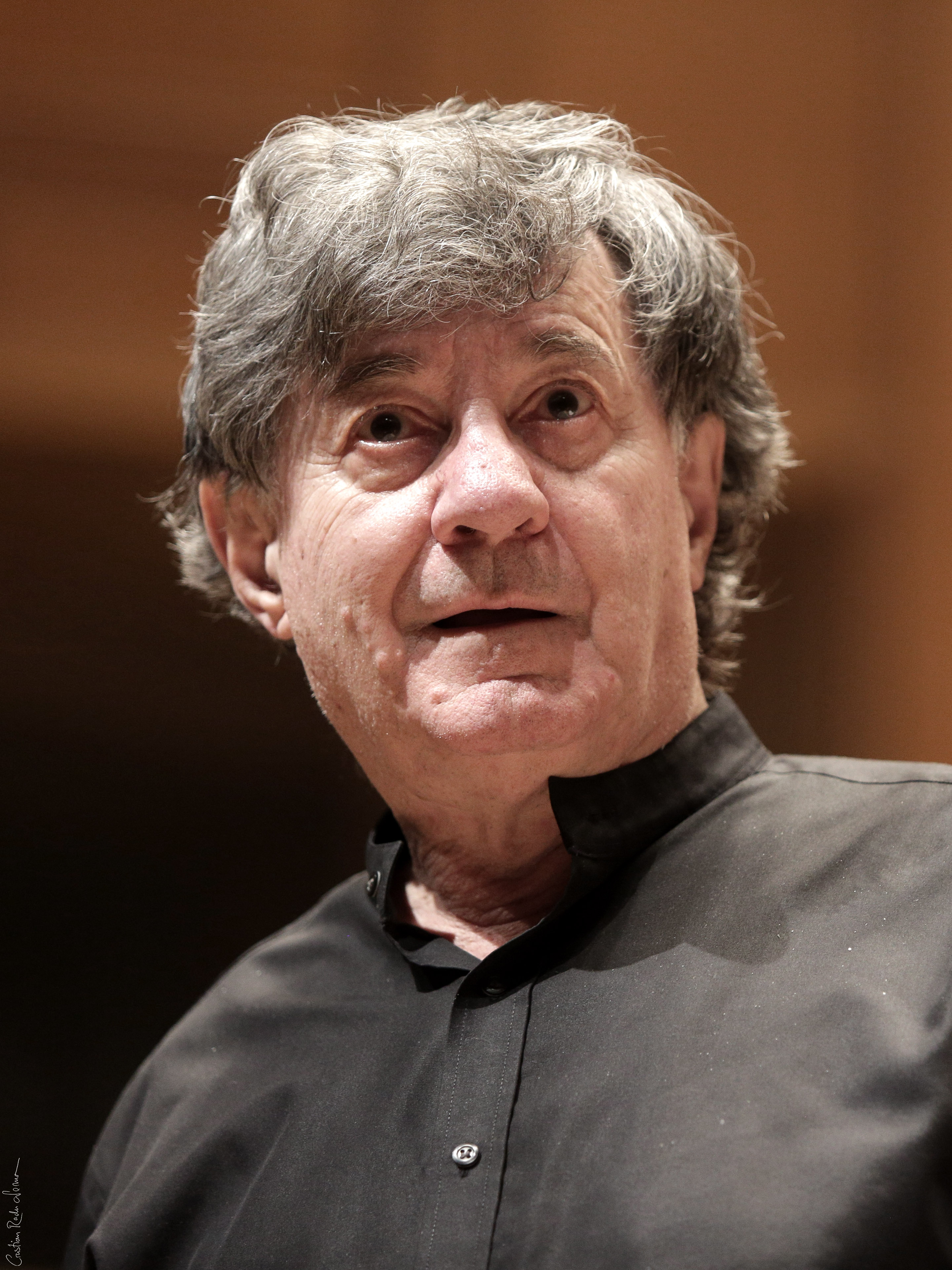
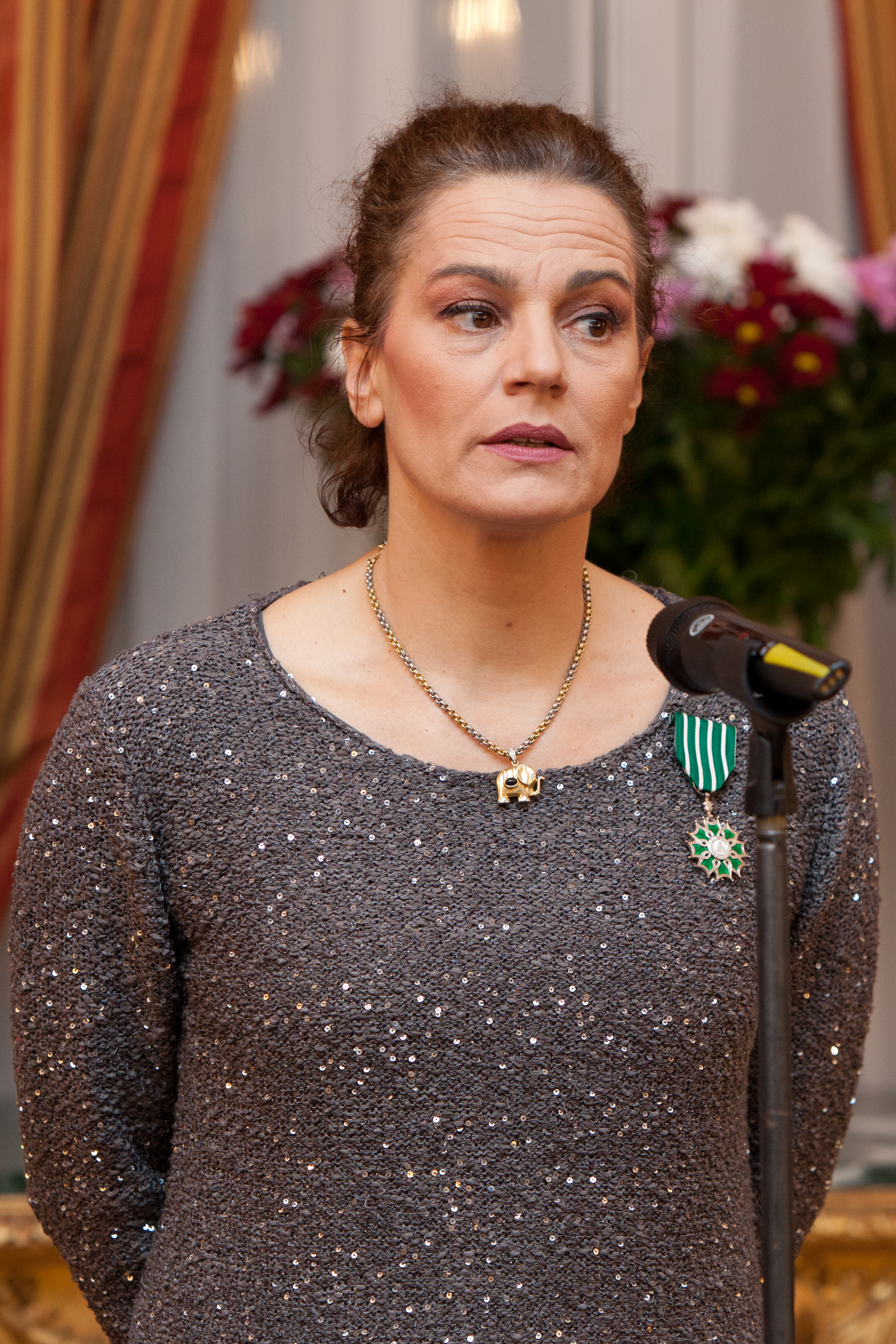
- From top, left to right: Draga Olteanu; Victor Rebengiuc; Cristian Mungiu; Sergiu Nicolaescu; Amza Pellea; Florin Piersic; Sebastian Papaiani and Dem Rădulescu; Ion Caramitru; Maia Morgenstern
- No. of screens: 486 (2025)
  - Per capita: 2.2 per 100,000 (2017)
- Main distributors: Vertical Entertainment 26.5% Ro Image 2000 21.3% Forum Film Romania 20.3% Intercomfilm Romania 5.4%

Produced feature films (2025)
- Total: 39
- Fictional: 28
- Documentary: 11

Number of admissions (2025)
- Total: 11,201,943
  - Per capita: 0.59
- National films: 2,563,886 (23%)

Gross box office (2025)
- Total: 318 million RON
- National films: 72.2 million RON

The cinema of Romania is the art of motion-picture making within the nation of Romania or by Romanian filmmakers abroad. The history of cinema in Romania dates back to the late 19th century, as early as the history of film itself. With the first set of films screened on May 27, 1896, in the building of L'Indépendance Roumanie newspaper in Bucharest. In the Romanian exhibition, a team of Lumière brothers' employees screened several films, including the famous L'Arrivée d'un train en gare de La Ciotat. The next year, in 1897, the French cameraman Paul Menu (an employee of the Lumière brothers) shot the first film set in Romania, The Royal parade on May 10, 1897. The first Romanian filmmaker was doctor Gheorghe Marinescu. He created a series of medically themed short films for the first time in history between 1898 and 1899.

The cinema of Romania has been home to many internationally acclaimed films and directors. The first internationally awarded Romanian movie was the 1938 documentary Țara Moților (about Moților Land in the Apuseni Mountains, Romania) directed by Paul Călinescu which received a prize at the 1939 7th Venice International Film Festival. The first Romanian film that won an award from the Cannes Film Festival was the 1957 animated short film "Scurtă istorie" (A Short History) directed by Ion Popescu-Gopo. The film won the Short Film Palme d'Or at the 1957 Cannes Film Festival. The first live-action Romanian film that won an award from the Cannes Film Festival was the 1965 film Forest of the Hanged. The film's director, Liviu Ciulei won the award for Best Director at the 1965 Cannes Film Festival.

Romanian cinema achieved wide international recognition in the 2000s with the Romanian New Wave movement that often incorporated a genre of realist and minimalist films that won many awards at European film festivals such as the Cannes Film Festival and the Berlin International Film Festival.

== Actualities (1897-1910) ==
The history of cinema in Romania started before 1900, pushed by film screenings which helped arouse public curiosity towards the new invention and enthusiastic cameramen began making films out of passion for the newly discovered art. Due to the rudimentary technical conditions, the early films were actualities, very short (many less than one minute) one-shot scenes capturing moments of everyday life.

The first cinematographic projection in Romania took place on 27 May 1896, less than five months after the first public film exhibition by the Lumière brothers on 28 December 1895 in Paris. In the Romanian exhibition, a team of Lumière brothers' employees screened several films, including the famous L'Arrivée d'un train en gare de La Ciotat. The event was arranged by Edwin Schurmann, the impresario of Adelina Patti and Eleonora Duse, and was hosted by the French-language newspaper L'Indépendance Roumanie. Mișu Văcărescu (descendant of the boyar Văcărescu family), a journalist for L'Indépendance Roumanie, noted that "there took place a representation of 'the miracle of the century'". Initially an elite attraction, permanent screenings both in the building of L'Indépendance Roumanie and in other locations (such as the biggest room of the newspaper building on Eforiei Spitalelor Civile Boulevard, then the Hugues room across from the old National Theatre) helped bring the ticket price down and cinema became a popular spectacle in Bucharest.

The next year, in 1897, the French cameraman Paul Menu (an employee of the Lumière brothers) shot the first film set in Romania, The Royal parade on 10 May 1897, showing King Carol I mounted, taking his place on the boulevard to head the parade. He continued by filming other 16 news items over the following two months, but only two survive today as nr. 551 and 552 in the Lumière catalogue. Menu's first Romanian films were presented on 8 June/23 June 1897, including images of the floods at Galați, Romanian Navy vessels on the Danube, and scenes from the Băneasa Hippodrome.

Starting in 1906, in Macedonia, the Aromanian Manakia brothers made a career with their social and ethnographic themed actualities.

Film screenings resumed in Bucharest in 1905 at various locations, as the Edison, the Eforie, the Lyric Theatre, and Circul Sidoli. In May 1909, the first theater in Romania built especially for exhibiting films, Volta, was opened on Doamnei Street in Bucharest. Transylvania, then part of Austria-Hungary, had already had its first movie theatre in Brașov since 1901. Volta was followed starting with the next year by others, such as Bleriot on Sărindar Street, Bristol, Apollo and Venus. The programs consisted of actualities and short "little films with actors" (for example, a five-minute shot of Victor Eftimiu and Aristizza Romanescu during a stately walk on the seashore). The films gradually increased in running time, eventually developing into newsreels and fiction films.

== First scientific films in history (1898-1899) ==
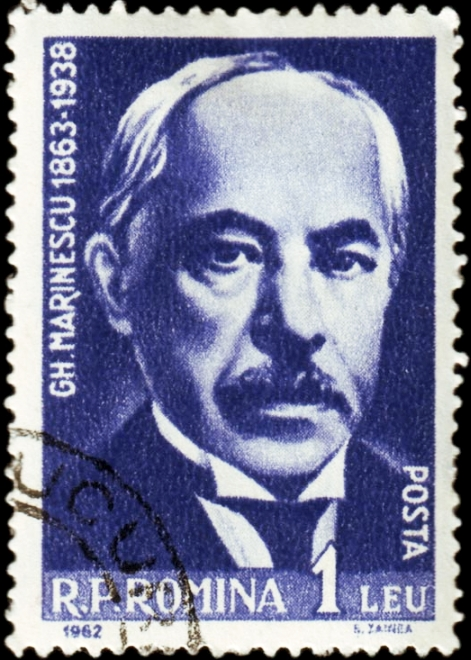
Gheorghe Marinescu, the first Romanian filmmaker, on a 1962 Romanian post stamp.

By 1898, public interest in cinema started fading, so Paul Menu offered his camera for sale. The camera was bought by doctor Gheorghe Marinescu who became the first Romanian filmmaker, realizing a series of short medically themed films for the first time in history between 1898 and 1899. Gheorghe Marinescu, together with cameraman Constantin M. Popescu, made in 1898 the first scientific film in the world, Walking difficulties in organic hemiplegia. In a letter to doctor Marinescu from 29 July 1924, speaking about these films, Auguste Lumière wrote: "I've seen your scientific reports about the usage of cinematograph in studies of nervous illnesses, when I was still receiving La Semaine Médicale. Unfortunately, not many scientists have followed your way." His films were considered lost until 1975, when a TV reporter named Cornel Rusu discovered them in a metal cabinet in a hospital bearing the famous doctor's name.

== First Romanian silent era films (1911-1920) ==
Independența României directed by Aristide Demetriade in 1912, the earliest Romanian scripted film that has survived to this day.

An investigation regarding the beginnings of non-actualities Romanian fiction films, published in an insert of the newspaper Cuvântul (The Word) in December 1933, mentions that in 1911 an "arrangement of a play for the cinema", Păpușa (The Doll), was produced by the cameramen Nicolae Barbelian and Demichelli in collaboration with the head of the actors' troupe, Marinescu. At the same time, Victor Eftimiu, in collaboration with Emil Gârleanu, wrote a film script which they offered for free to a certain Georgescu. The resultant film, called Dragoste la mănăstire (Love in a Monastery) or Două altare (Two Altars) and shown only in 1914, played for just eight days. This was despite the fact that the film was composed merely of shots taken during two rehearsals for the role, attended by Tony Bulandra and Marioara Voiculescu, the rest of the film being taken up by intertitles and long letters.

The first Romanian fiction film was Amor Fatal (Fatal Love Affair), starring Lucia Sturdza, Tony Bulandra and Aurel Barbelian, actors from the National Theatre Bucharest. The film was directed by Grigore Brezeanu, a director from the same theatre and the son of the great actor Ion Brezeanu. The film played between 26 and 30 September 1911 at the Apollo Cinema.

On 7 November 1911, the film Înșirăte mărgărite... (Spread Yourselves, Daisies) premiered. It was based on Victor Eftimiu's poem, and in fact showed scenes filmed in different locations in the country for the completion of the play with the same name that was playing at the National Theatre Bucharest; it was what today would be called a magic lantern show. Aristide Demetriade and Grigore Brezeanu directed. Aristide Demetriade appeared in the role of Făt-Frumos. This film/theatre hybrid was well received by spectators of the day.

In December 1911, the theatrical magazine Rampa published a note under the heading "The Cinema in the Theatre" (signed by V. Scânteie) indicating that "The Maestro Nottara is in the course of making a patriotic work re-creating the Romanian War of Independence on film, so that today's generations might learn the story of the battles of 1877, and for future generations a live tableau of Romanian bravery will remain".

As a result, the director of the Bucharest branch of the Gaumont-Paris studio, Raymond Pellerin, announced the premiere of his film Războiul din 1877-1878 (The 1877–1878 War), scheduled for 29 December 1911. A "film" made in haste, with a troupe of second-hand actors and with the help of General Constantinescu, who commanded a division at Pitești, from whom he had obtained the extras needed for the war scenes, "Războiul din 1877-1878" was screened a day before by the prefect of the capital's police, who decided that it did not correspond with historic fact. Consequently, the film was confiscated and destroyed, Raymond Pellerin was declared persona non grata and he left for Paris, while the "collaborationist" general saw himself moved to another garrison as a means of discipline.

On 5 May 1912, the magazine Flacăra (The Flame) brought to its readers' attention the fact that "as it is known, a few artists have founded a society with the goal of producing a film about the War of Independence... Such an undertaking deserves to be applauded". The initiators were a group of actors: Constantin Nottara, Aristide Demetriade, V. Toneanu, Ion Brezeanu, N. Soreanu, P. Liciu, as well as the young Grigore Brezeanu, associate producer and the creative force behind the whole operation. Since a large amount of money was needed for the production, they also brought into this effort Leon Popescu, a wealthy man and owner of the Lyric Theatre. The group received strong backing from government authorities, with the army and all necessary equipment being placed at its disposal, plus military advisers (possibly including Pascal Vidrașcu). The cameras and their operators were brought from abroad, and the print was prepared in Parisian laboratories. Could Grigore Brezeanu have been the film's director? No source from that time gives credence to such a hypothesis. On the contrary, they present him as "initiator", producer of the film, beside members of the National Theatre and Leon Popescu. Furthermore, it appears that it was he who attracted the financier of the entire undertaking. In 1985, the film critic Tudor Caranfil discovered among Aristide Demetriade's papers his director's notebooks for Independența României, unequivocally confirming that he was the film's director. Thus, the film's production crew was as follows: Producers: Leon Popescu, Aristide Demetriade, Grigore Brezeanu, Constantin Nottara, Pascal Vidrașcu. Screenwriters: Petre Liciu, Constantin Nottara, Aristide Demetriade, Corneliu Moldoveanu. Director: Aristide Demetriade. Cinematographer: Franck Daniau. Makeup and hairstylist: Pepi Machauer.

On 2 September 1912, at the Eforie cinema in Bucharest, the premiere of Independența României took place. Despite all its shortcomings; theatrical game of the actors, errors of the extras uncontrolled by direction which provoked unintended laughter in some scenes, the film was well received by spectators, being shown for several weeks. Through the dimensions of its theme, distribution method, genuine artistic intentions, and its professional editing for the time, the creation of this film can be considered Romania's first step in the art of cinematography.

And yet he who had realized this work, the man who kept the whole team together, the theatre director Grigore Brezeanu, was left disappointed. The press of the time made ostentatious mention of Leon Popescu, who financed the film and made sure to distance the other financiers, buying their part; no such praise was heaped on the artistic makers of the film. This caused producer Grigore Brezeanu to say in an interview given to the magazine "Rampa" and published on 13 April 1913: "My dream would have been to build a large film studio. I have come to believe that this is impossible. First of all, we are missing a large capital investment. Without money we cannot rival the foreign studios...A studio, according to our financiers, is something outside art, something in the realm of agriculture or the C.F.R. Hence I have abandoned this dream with great regret."

But Leon Popescu — after the appearance of certain products allegedly of the Romanian cinema, filmed by the Pathe-Frères studio and featuring second-hand actors; in fact, these were a mixture of foreign films with scenes shot in which Romanian actors appeared (they were presented on the stages of movie theatres, in the form of theatre productions played by actors "in flesh and blood" coupled with filmed scenes of the same actors), known as "cinemasketches" — responded with a wide-ranging offensive plan, forming the Film de artă Leon Popescu (Leon Popescu Art Film) society in 1913.

Collaborating with the troupe of Marioara Voiculescu, which included actors sympathetic to Popescu (C. Radovici, Ion Manolescu and G. Storin), they managed to put on the market the following films: Amorul unei prințese (The Love Affair of a Princess) (1913), Răzbunarea (Revenge) (1913), Urgia cerească (The Sky-borne Disaster) (1913), Cetatea Neamțului (The Neamț Citadel) (1914), Spionul (The Spy) (1914), with all but the penultimate proving to be well below expectations.

Notably, in 1913, there appeared another Romanian film, Oțelul răzbună (Steel Takes Its Revenge), directed by Aristide Demetriade - who that same year directed another film: Scheci cu Jack Bill (Sketch with Jack Bill). The film was financed by the director, with substantial help from Professor Gheorghe Arion (8,000 lei). The 40-minute film received favorable reviews and enjoyed great success. Today only one reel remains at the A.N.F., taking up a minute of projection time; happily, all the actors can be seen in close-up. The film's producer was Gheorghe Arion; its director and editor was Aristide Demetriade; Franck Daniau was the cinematographer, and it starred Aristide Demetriade, Andrei Popovici, Mărioara Cinsky, Țacovici-Cosmin, Nicolae Grigorescu, Petre Bulandra, and Romuald Bulfinsky.

At the end of 1914, the Leon Popescu Society merged with the Cipeto society with the aim of importing small-sized projectors and at the same time of renting films produced by the Marioara Voiculescu company to third parties.

During the First World War, film production was mainly directed toward documentaries and newsreels. The few Romanian cameramen were mobilized, and during the retreat to Moldova all film cameras in the country were saved. His Majesty Ferdinand I was filmed on the front, together with the generals Constantin Prezan and Alexandru Averescu, while Queen Marie was filmed in hospitals, easing the suffering of patients. Few sequences remain of the thousands of metres filmed. Some of these were later used in the film Ecaterina Teodoroiu, produced in 1930.

After World War I, internationally, film production developed in accordance with the interest of businessmen in the new industry. New studios endowed with good equipment and specialists well trained in the new technology appeared, directors and actors known to the public at large were attracted to work in the new industry, as were renowned screenwriters. Markets were opened for finished film products, which through a market-tested formula managed to bring profits and finance new productions. Film industries with lavish financial resources came to dominate the market, decimating national cinemas.

To all these were added two other catastrophes: Leon Popescu died in 1918, after which his studio on the grounds of the Lyric Theatre burned down. Miraculously, of all the films, only one was saved: a copy of Independența României (this being incomplete, with about 20 minutes missing). According to other versions of the story told at the time, suffering from a crisis of nerves brought about by his films' failures, Leon Popescu set fire to his own storehouse of films and died shortly thereafter.

In 1920, a film studio, Soarele (The Sun), began producing Pe valurile fericirii (On the Waves of Happiness), which starred the Hungarian actress Lya De Putti, and the Romanian actors Maria Filotti, Ion Manolescu, Gheorghe Storin, Alexandre Mihalesco, and Tantzi Cutava-Barozzi. It was directed by Dolly A. Sigetti and the script was based on a play by K. Williamson. The film was never completed. Nevertheless, a few sequences were shown in the form of a trailer.

== First Romanian animated film (1920) ==
The year 1920 marked the production of the first Romanian animated film, more precisely of the first Romanian animated cartoon, conceived by Aurel Petrescu and called Păcală în lună (Păcală on the moon). Surprisingly, all the animated films of this director and artist, which he was producing into the sound era, are lost. Showing foresight, Aurel Petrescu created an album with about 80 stills, today owned by the A.N.F (Arhiva Națională de Filme, in English: National Movie Archive) and from which we can get an idea of the techniques used by Petrescu in animating. Some stills have on their edge the black strip denoting recorded sound, which has led researchers to confirm that in his last phase, Petrescu produced sound cartoons.

== Romanian silent era films (1921-1930) ==
Jean Mihail was one of the pioneers of Romanian cinema. He began his career through his participation as assistant director under the German Alfred Hallm, director of Țigăncușa din iatac (The Gypsy Girl in the Bedroom). The film, shot on locations such as Mogoșoaia Palace, Pasărea Monastery, and Minovici Vila, was based on a script by Victor Beldiman, in turn written after a novel by Radu Rosseti. It was a Spera-Film Berlin and Rador-Film Bucharest co-production. It starred Dorina Heller, Elvira Popescu, Ion Iancovescu, Mitzi Vecera, Tantzi Elvas, Ecaterina Vigny, Leon Lefter, Petre Sturdza, Petrescu Muscă and premiered on 30 December 1923. The film is lost today.

The young actor-director Jean Georgescu found an investor in the year 1925 who invested his savings in the production of a film called Năbădăile Cleopatrei (Cleopatra's Caprices). Ion Șahighian made his directing debut on this film, which starred Jean Georgescu, Ion Finteșteanu, A. Pop Marțian, Alexandru Giugaru, N. Soreanu, Brândușa Grozăvescu and others. It premiered on 5 October 1925 at the Lux theatre. In the same fashion, Jean Georgescu produced the film Milionar pentru o zi (Millionaire for a Day) (1925) in a Bucharest cabaret, since the owner wanted to advertise the building.

Jean Mihail directed Lia (1927), on a screenplay by Mircea Filotti financed by a German businessman who wanted to fulfill the wish of his wife, well-known actress Lilly Flohr. Likewise, he made Povara (The Burden) at Vienna in 1928 with the money of a lady who wished to see her name listed in the credits as production director.

At the request of a firm that sold coffee, radios, etc., Marcel Blossoms and Micu Kellerman directed the film Lache în harem (1927) (The valet in the harem).

On other occasions, due to lack of money, film enthusiasts would form a cooperative: one would contribute the camera, the other the laboratory, the other the script, the other the direction; the actors were easily obtained due to their desire to see themselves on screen, and finally they had to find a creditor willing to lend them some money on the assurance that it would be returned to him after "the great success of the premiere". This is how there appeared under Jean Mihail's direction Păcat (Sin) (1924) and Manasse (Manasseh) (1925). The actor Ghiță Popescu directed Legenda celor două cruci (The Legend of the Two Crosses) (1925), Vitejii neamului (The Bravest of Our People) (1926) and Năpasta (The Calamity) (1927). Jean Georgescu directed Maiorul Mura (Major Mura) (1928), financed by collecting money from friends.

The attraction of the screen and the real desire to make a name for oneself in the new art led to the foundation of several film schools. Students' tuition fees paid for the production of certain films. Of course, the students were unpaid actors, which allowed for widespread distribution. The Clipa-Film studio produced, with this form of financing, the films Iadeș (The Wishbone) (1926), Iancu Jianu (1927), Haiducii (The Haiducs) (1929), Ciocoii (The Boyars) (1930) and, later, Insula Șerpilor (Snake Island) (1934), the penultimate one featuring an attempt at sound, and the last one being a talkie.

On the other hand, a film production society called Soremar, generally specializing in documentaries and newsreels, produced the 1928 film Simfonia dragostei (The Symphony of Love), directed by Ion Șahighian. With the director Niculescu Brumă they produced the film Ecaterina Teodoroiu, in which there appear clips filmed during the First World War of the great personages of the time; the mother of Ecaterina Teodoroiu appeared as herself. These films were produced in Vienna studios.

Other films from this period include Gogulică C.F.R. (1929) (unfinished), and Haplea (The Dullard) (animated by Marin Iorda in 1928) - the first Romanian animated film preserved archivally.

From a technical point of view, making these films was very difficult. If a film camera could be obtained from newsreel photographers, the print was prepared with them also. The problem of finding a set to use was very difficult, with the director searching for a set among all nearby warehouses, granaries, stables or dance halls. Sometimes filming was done in different apartments or in homes owned by those willing to help. Lights were usually gathered up from photographers' studios. Often, due to overcrowding in residences, films would accidentally display a light or the cameraman and his camera reflected in a mirror or a piece of furniture. The best locations were those offered by various theatres on occasion that work take place at night. Another solution was for them to shoot interiors outdoors. They built their "interiors" on sets exposed to sunlight (thus eliminating artificial lights) and built on a platform that could be rotated and thus make full use of sunlight. The technical crews, in contrast to those found abroad, had to be jacks-of-all-trades, yet ultimately workmen: the cameraman would also prepare the print in the laboratory, the director might be a make-up artist as well, the producer a prop-man, an actor an assistant director. As for distribution, this depended on the actors' willingness to work for free. To all this was added the fact that negatives were scarce, meaning that sequences were filmed in one take only, regardless of the quality of the outcome.

On the other hand, the intellectuals of the day still considered cinematographic art to be a lowly sideshow, not according it its due importance. It is true that the specialty press was also rather thin on content and sometimes uninspired. In 1928 Tudor Vianu wrote in the article "The Movie Theatre and the Radio Broadcaster in the Politics of Culture": "The cinematic press [was] created first of all in order to sustain the interests of cinematographic capitalism...There is no actor, no matter how mediocre, not to have been proclaimed a first-rate star by the cinematic press and there is no film, no matter how boring or mundane, not to have been declared an incomparable achievement".

At the end of the 1920s and beginning of the 1930s, cinema entered the consciousness of certain Romanian writers and cultural figures, such as Tudor Vianu, Liviu Rebreanu, Victor Eftimiu, Camil Petrescu and Dimitrie Gusti, who all became aware of this new mode of expression and culture. As Rebreanu observed in 1930,

...In the great haste toward the realization of the art, of a true cinematographic art, Romanian efforts cannot be futile. As much as our material and technical means have not permitted us to participate in the peoples' race toward the new art, I think the moment must come when we bring a Romanian contribution as well...Romanian talent would have a large possibility to manifest itself.

In this period the film critic D. I. Suchianu made his debut, first in newspapers, then in 1929 in radio. Later on the critic Ion Filotti Cantacuzino also started broadcasting.

The Romanian poet and aristocract Elena Văcărescu said in 1930 about the importance of the cinematic art: "Having great power at its disposal, the cinema should work hard...toward the greatest good of peoples and what brings them together, that is, toward peace".

== Romanian sound era films (1930-1947) ==
The appearance of sound films opened a new stage in the development of world cinema, by implication in the cinema of Romania as well. The appearance of sound further complicated the tricky problem of the technical-material base, both in terms of production and of projection in theatres. From 1930 until 1939, only 16 films were produced. The majority were "Romanian versions" of foreign films produced in Paris, Prague or Budapest studios with a few Romanian technicians and some Romanian actors. . Among these were the Franco-American film Parada Paramount (Paramount on Parade), Televiziune (Television) (both 1931 and dubbed in Paris) (with George Vraca's voice in the second film), Fum (Smoke) 1931, Trenul fantomă (The Phantom Train) 1933, Prima dragoste (First Love) and Suflete în furtună (Tempest-tossed Souls) 1934, Hungarian films dubbed in Budapest.

The German director Martin Berger, who in 1929 had directed the silent film (among the last Romanian silent films) Venea o moară pe Siret (A Mill Was Coming down the Siret) through an official subsidy, came back and in 1930 directed a film based on the novel by Liviu Rebreanu with the same name, Ciuleandra. This was the first Romanian talking film. The film was an artistic fiasco because the famous German actors provoked laughter through the German accent they had when speaking Romanian. Even the few Romanian actors who appeared in the film spoke strangely, as the German producers, being unused to the cadence of the Romanian language, imposed a diction of phrases with long pauses. Hence, in one scene, the son climbed down a staircase saying one word on each step: "How... are... you... father?". The reply sounds the same: "Fine... dear..."!

The year 1932 brought the production Visul lui Tănase (Tănase's Dream) to Romanian screens. It was self-produced in Berlin by Constantin Tănase. He was the film's financier, screenwriter, and its principal star alongside several good Romanian actors, while the German side provided the studio, direction, technicians, and a troupe of actors.

The great comedians of the inter-war Romanian stage, Stroe and Vasilache, managed, with the help of a Romanian engineer, Argani, who had put together a sound device, to produce the only entirely domestic film of the period, titled Bing-Bang (1934). As film posters noted, it was a "humorous musical" based on a script by Argani, Stroe, and Vasilache; with camerawork by I. Bartok; music by N. Stroe and Vasile Vasilache; musical arrangements by Mihai Constantinescu and Max Halm; and starring N. Stroe, Vasile Vasilache, Nora Piacenti, Grigore Vasiliu Birlic, Titi Botez, C. Calmuschi, Silly Vasiliu, Nutzi Pantazi, Lucica Părvulescu, Richard Rang, Alexandru Brunetti, and Alexandru Giovani. Its premiere took place on 7 February 1935 at the Arpa Cinema, inside the Bucharest Military Circle.

Enthusiastic Romanian directors, due to lack of funds and disinterest on the part of the ruling authorities, all began to take other paths in their lives. Jean Georgescu left for Paris, where he added sound to his 1934 film, State la București (States in Bucharest) in the Gaumont Studio; the film had originally been made as a silent comedy. Ion Șahighian left cinema for the theatre. Eftimie Vasilescu worked as a newsreel photographer. Only Jean Mihail remained a director based in Romania, though he too had to do work abroad, participating in the dubbing of films at Hunnia Film Studio in Budapest and Barrandov Studios in Czechoslovakia.

During this nadir of Romanian cinema a ray of hope appeared. Politicians, and not only in Romania, realized the great influential power that cinema had as part of the mass media. Cinema could be used for purposes of propaganda, for influencing the masses at large with different levels of culture. (Even Lenin, realizing the propaganda power of film, said: "Of all the arts, the most important for us is cinema". Hence, film could be used as an important ideological weapon and the Communists needed it in their "great work" of destroying democracies). Furthermore, it had been proven that the tenacious work of Romanian film directors, despite all its imperfections, had been well received by the public, and had begun to prove right those who kept calling for subsidies toward the production of Romanian films.

Thus, at the beginning of 1934, a law was passed establishing a National Cinema Fund. This was funded through a tax of 1 leu per ticket and 10 lei per meter of imported film. Its stated purpose was to create a material base for Romanian film production (studios, laboratories, equipment, etc.) and, as subsequent revenue came in, to finance productions as well. The fund's administration was placed in the hands of a committee formed by Professor Tudor Vianu, Professor Alexandru Rosetti and the writer Ion Marin Sadoveanu. These taxes provoked strong protests from film importers and movie theatre owners, yet with the authorities not yielding, tempers soon relaxed.

Following the passage of this law, Romanian cinéastes began a flurry of activity, planning all sorts of projects. An entrepreneur brought in a Bell-Howel sound recorder and founded a company called The Romanian Sound Film Industry, commencing with the production of newsreels. Together with Jean Mihail he began the production of a documentary film, România (Romania).

Through the contribution of a private entrepreneur, Tudor Posmantir, a laboratory named Ciro-film was built in 1936–1937, equipped with Debrie devices. This was a modern laboratory for developing and copying films, thus assuring that modern work techniques would be used. A "film studio" was also built nearby–this was in fact a large wooden hangar, but rather good for producing films. It was here that Ion Șahighian filmed O noapte de pomină (An Unforgettable Night), from a script by Tudor Mușatescu, starring George Timică and Dina Cocea, in 1939. The film found great success with audiences and received a favorable critical reception. Thus it was shown what good technical equipment could do for the industry.

Through various governments' decisions, the National Cinema Fund was placed within the Tourism Office, where a cinema section had been established for creating travelogues. The material base created was that initially stated as the project's goal and indeed of good quality. The film cameras were of the newsreel type, with portable sound equipment set up in an automobile; work was soon finished on a sound recording room for documentaries, with minimal artificial lights in the studio. This all disappointed the creators of artistic films, as they lacked suitable sets for filming.

Also in this period at the end of the 1930s, Oficiul Național Cinematografic (ONC, the National Cinematographic Office) was formed, headed by the film critic D. I. Suchianu. In the beginning the office worked on a periodic newsreel program and on documentary production. Construction was also begun on a studio and completed with difficulty due to the start of World War II. The ONC produced the documentary Țara Moților (Moților Land), which received a prize at the 1938 Venice Film Festival. The film was directed by Paul Călinescu and marked the entry of the Romanian documentary into the realm of cinematic art. During the war, the ONC was placed at the disposal of the Army General Staff, the majority of cameramen being sent to the front, and technicians being employed exclusively for the needs of wartime propaganda.

Despite all these difficulties, the film O noapte furtunoasă (A Stormy Night) was completed between 1941 and 1942 in the ONC "studio". Producing the film under wartime conditions was a labor fit for Sisyphus, equally for the actors, cameraman, stage electricians, script-girl, stage designers and prop handlers. All the exteriors had to be constructed in the small 18×11 m studio, intended for music recording, since exterior shooting at night was impossible due to the need to maintain camouflage. For panoramic or travelling shots, two or three scenes had to be shot on a stage that had to be decorated two or three times over, and then combined in order to constitute a whole shot. The way this worked in practice was that once a scene was filmed, the set was taken down and the next design thrown up. Only one thing was not lacking for them: photographic material. In the end, 29,000 m were shot. The film O noapte furtunoasă was directed by Jean Georgescu, based on the eponymous comedy by Ion Luca Caragiale; the assistant directors were Ionel Iliescu, Virgil Stoenescu, I. Marinescu, and P. Băleanu; the cameraman was Gerard Perrin (from Paris); the sound engineers were A. Bielisici, V. Cantunari, and G. Mărăi; editing was done by Ivonne Hérault (from Paris) and Lucia Anton; makeup by the Sturh couple (of Berlin); choreography by Emil Bobescu; music by Paul Constantinescu; set design by Ștefan Norris; storyboards and costumes by Aurel Jiquidi; and production direction by Ion Cantacuzino. The film starred Alexandru Giugaru, Maria Maximilian, Florica Demion, Radu Beligan, Iordănescu Bruno, George Demetru, Ion Baroi, George Ciprian, Miluță Ghiorghiu, Leontina Ioanid, Doina Missir, Iuliana Sym, Cornelia Teodosiu, Elena Bulandra, Vasiliu Falti, Lică Rădulescu, Ion Stănescu, Nicolae Teodoru, O. Rocos, Iancu Constantinescu and Jean Moscopol. It premiered on 22 March 1943 at the ARO theatre. This was the first and last film produced by the ONC; for many years it remained a point of reference in the annals of cinematic art in Romania.

Film production nevertheless continued. In 1944, a Romanian-Italian company, Cineromit, assigned the production of the film Visul unei nopți de iarnă (A Winter Night's Dream) to director Jean Georgescu; the script was from the play by Tudor Mușatescu. The film was finished only near the end of the year 1945 due to the events of the war. For the most part, the technical crew was that of O noapte furtunoasă, plus the French cameraman Louis Behrend. The actors were George Demetru, Ana Colda, Maria Filotti, Mișu Fotino and Radu Beligan. It premiered on 2 March 1946 at the Excelsior cinema.

There followed in rapid succession several productions completed in cooperation with Danish and Hungarian studios by Balcan-Film Company Bucharest. Of note were Allo București (Hello Bucharest), Furtul din Arizona (The Arizona Theft) and "Două lumi și o dragoste" (Two Worlds and One Love), all made in 1946.

Also important was the 1946, production Pădurea îndrăgostiților (The Lovers' Forest), produced at Doina-Film, on which the ONC technical crew worked, with the director and cameraman being Cornel Dumitrescu.

== Cinema during Communism (1948-1989) ==
On November 2, 1948, Decree 303 was signed, regarding "the nationalization of the film industry and the regulation of commerce in cinematic products", marking a new beginning for Romanian cinema. This can also be called the period of socialist cinema. The newly installed regime fully subsidized the production of films which disseminated promotion of socialist values. The same themes were found in documentaries and newsreels.

To have cadres ready to fill the necessary positions in the industry, Institutul de artă cinematografică (The Institute of Cinematographic Art") was founded, with a mission of preparing the new cadres needed for the new cinema: actors, directors and cameramen. Many famous Romanian film and national theatre actors and directors graduated from the institute: Actors Silvia Popovici, Iurie Darie, Florin Piersic, Constantin Diplan, Amza Pellea, Dem Rădulescu, Stela Popescu, Sebastian Papaiani, Leopoldina Bălănuță, and Draga Olteanu, and directors such as Manole Marcus, Geo Saizescu, Iulian Mihu, Gheorghe Vitanidis, and many others.

In 1950, construction began at Buftea on what would come to be called Centrul de producție cinematografică Buftea (The Buftea Studio), also known as C.P.C. Buftea (today MediaPro Studios), the main center for film production in Romania. The project was finished in 1959. Technically speaking, C.P.C. Buftea rivalled any Western European film studio.

In this period a series of films was produced at the Floreasca Complex, which, since 1956, had been taken over by Televiziunea Română (Romanian Television). Another studio of about 320 m^{2} (3,400 sq ft) was built inside the Tomis Cinema. For the production of technical supplies needed both by studios and film distributors, Intreprinderea de Stat Tehnocin (The Tehnocin State Enterprise) was founded in 1950 and in 1959 merged with Industria Optică Română (The Romanian Optics Industry). Movie projectors for 35 mm and 16 mm film were produced, as were sound systems for movie theatres, reflecting lenses, dollies, and artificial studio lights.

Likewise, so that there would be technical cadres well-prepared to work in studios and in the operation of movie projectors, professional schools for projectionists were founded at Craiova and Târgu-Mureș, while at Bucharest, a "technical school for technical personnel" was opened, intended to prepare movie theatre operators and studio managers.

Until 1948, most of the Romanian animated films were the ones made by Aurel Petrescu but all his animated movies have been lost. However, after 1948 animated films began to be produced at the Bucharest Studio, with a total of 15 films in 1955. Particularly notable was the contribution of Ion Popescu-Gopo, father of the little man who, appearing in Scurtă istorie (A Short History) in 1957, won him a Palme d'Or for Best Short Film at Cannes that year. The success of Romania's animated films convinced the authorities to found the Animafilm studio in 1964. Here, "diafilms", slides for teaching use, were also produced, as were television commercials.

As far as the distribution of films is concerned, after the nationalization of movie theatres (only 35 mm ones, as 16 mm theatres did not exist), it was concluded that many had to be shut down because of their decaying state or because of their physically obsolete equipment. A crisis followed, there being a shortage of theatre administrators and projectionists that forced films in some counties to be shown only outdoors. This situation caused the Committee for Cinematography to be formed on 7 June 1950 alongside the Council of Ministers, and inside this institution the Film Distribution Network Directorate was established. Later, this office ran the County-level Cinematographic State Enterprises when they were established. The importance of these led to the allocation of funds necessary for the film distribution network to be developed. Implicitly, movie theatres and the establishment of 16 mm cinemas in rural areas were also a goal–together, these objectives were known as cineficare ("filmification", analogous to electrification). In the 1950s, 1,000 16 mm projectors and 100 film caravans (mobile theatres) were imported from the Soviet Union in order to promote the introduction of film into the rural environment. Reorganizations also took place in the next few years. Thus, in July 1952, Direcția Difuzării Filmelor (D.D.F.) (The Film Screening Directorate) was founded. In 1956 this was merged with the Film Distribution Network Directorate to form Direcția Rețelei Cinematografice și a Difuzării Filmelor (D.R.C.D.F) (The Film Distribution and Screening Directorate), under the guidance of the Ministry of Culture. The purpose of this institution was to promote a single policy regarding Romania's movie theatres, "the control and guidance of political-ideological work with the cinema, the showing of films based on the political-technical demands of the various stages of the construction of socialism", as well as to craft the economical-financial plan to be fulfilled.

The reorganizations continued, so that in 1971 Centrala România-Film (Romania-Film Central) was founded, having under its authority C.P.C. Buftea, the financing of film production through five studios, import-export and the screening of films.

Although the technical vagaries of the industry at this time have nothing to do with the cinema of Romania as an art, it is also useful to recall how distribution into movie theatres took place. Romanian film production, such as it was in 1948, was practically non-existent. The timid beginnings of Romanian film production were started by director Puiu Călinescu with the film Răsună Valea (The Valley Resounds), with a theme similar to those discussed above. But, for such a "rich national production", other films were needed in the screening repertoire. Hence, the focus was on importing films also produced in countries that had started down the path of constructing socialism. Many of them also had "rich productions" and so everyone in the Eastern Bloc's orientation was toward "the country with the best and most educational cinema in the world, the USSR".

Besides films promoting the new type of government and economy, directors made films which, without renouncing "educational" values, also numbered among them diversionary films, cloak and sword epics, and adaptations of, mostly Russian, literature. Films were even imported from countries without a socialist government. The importation of these films was done in a very rigorous manner with regard to themes. However, the public was not denied a chance to see some of the great works of cinema outside the European socialist bloc, including works of Italian neorealism and its successors (Rome, open city, Bicycle Thieves, and Rocco e i suoi fratelli), Judgment at Nuremberg, Guess Who's Coming to Dinner, In the Heat of the Night, a series of Westerns, Gone with the Wind (United States), and many others from France, the United Kingdom, Spain, Mexico, Japan, and China.

The number of films produced by Romanian studios rose, and import taxes were lowered. At one point, 40% of films shown were Romanian and 60% foreign, including those from other Warsaw Pact nations.

== Highest-grossing Romanian films before 1989 ==
Movies with most reported ticket sales before 1989
Film	Director	Year	Reported ticket sales
Uncle Marin, the Billionaire (Nea Mărin miliardar)	Sergiu Nicolaescu	1978	14,645,586
Păcală	Geo Saizescu	1974	14,644,029
Mihai Viteazul	Sergiu Nicolaescu	1971	13,340,304
Dacii	Sergiu Nicolaescu	1967	13,135,474
Neamul Șoimăreștilor	Mircea Dragan	1965	13,051,558
Tudor	Lucian Bratu	1963	11,411,828
The Column (Columna)	Mircea Dragan	1968	10,508,376
Haiducii	Dinu Cocea	1966	8,850,537
Cu mîinile curate	Sergiu Nicolaescu	1972	7,162,552
The Prophet, the Gold and the Transylvanians (Profetul, aurul și ardelenii	Dan Pita	1977	6,831,053

== Romanian cinema (1990–present) ==
Critically acclaimed Romanian New Wave

The collapse of Communism changed the situation of Romanian cinema. Romanian cinema achieved prominence in the 2000s with the Romanian New Wave movement that often incorporated a genre of realist and minimalist films that won multiple awards at the Cannes Film Festival and the Berlin International Film Festival.

In 2001 and 2002, Romanian directors competed in the Directors' Fortnight section parallel to the Cannes Film Festival with Cristi Puiu's first feature film Stuff and Dough and Cristian Mungiu's Occident, respectively.

The 2004 Trafic film directed by Cătălin Mitulescu won the Short Film Palme d'Or award at the 2004 Cannes Film Festival.

The 2005 The Death of Mr. Lazarescu film, directed by Cristi Puiu won the Un Certain Regard award at the 2005 Cannes Film Festival.

At the 2006 Cannes Film Festival, Corneliu Porumboiu won the Caméra d'Or best-first-feature award for 12:08 East of Bucharest and Cătălin Mitulescu who directed The Way I Spent the End of the World competed in the Un Certain Regard section.

At the 2007 Cannes Film Festival Cristian Nemescu's posthumous California Dreamin' won the Un Certain Regard award, while Cristian Mungiu's 4 Months, 3 Weeks and 2 Days received the Palme d'Or. The latter, according to Variety, is "further proof of Romania's new prominence in the film world."

Megatron by Marian Crișan won the Short Film Palme d'Or at the 2008 Cannes Film Festival.

The 2009 movie Police, Adjective directed by Corneliu Porumboiu won the Un Certain Regard award at the 2009 Cannes Film Festival.

In 2010, If I Want to Whistle, I Whistle (aka Eu când vreau să fluier, fluier) directed by Florin Șerban won the Silver Bear Grand Jury Prize and the Alfred Bauer Prize at the Berlin International Film Festival

In 2013 the movie Child's Pose (Pozitia copilului) directed by Călin Peter Netzer won the Golden Bear award at the 63rd Berlin International Film Festival.

In 2015 the movie Aferim! directed by Radu Jude won the Silver Bear for Best Director award at the 65th Berlin International Film Festival.

The 2015 independent horror movie Be My Cat: A Film for Anne has gained a cult following in later years.

The 2018 drama film Touch Me Not directed by Adina Pintilie won the Golden Bear award at the 68th Berlin International Film Festival.

The 2021 comedy-drama film Bad Luck Banging or Loony Porn written and directed by Radu Jude won the Golden Bear award at the Berlin International Film Festival. It is the third Romanian film to win the Golden Bear in the last decade.

Drop in the domestic Romanian box office

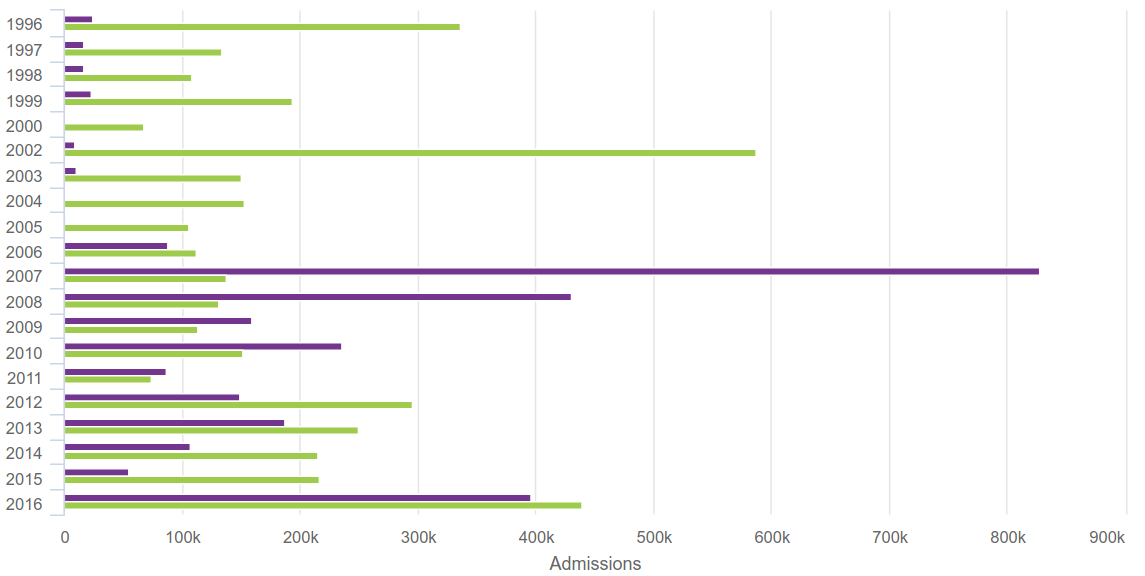
Total admissions to Romanian films in Romania and other European countries (1996-2016) It thereafter won many more prizes around the world, becoming the most awarded Romanian film ever made. American critics, previously rarely interested in Romanian cinema, were especially enthusiastic about the film; 93 percent of reviews it received were categorized by Rotten Tomatoes as positive. In Romania In other European countries

During the time period between 2012-2016, according to data by the European Audiovisual Observatory, domestic productions account for only about 3% of all admissions to cinema in Romania, with US productions dominating the market (72%). As an example, 4 Months, 3 Weeks and 2 Days was viewed by 350,000 people in France, 142,000 in Italy, but less than 90,000 in Romania itself.

Reemergence of domestic Romanian box office

In recent years, domestic Romanian cinema started to gain back popularity, especially in the comedy sector. With examples such as the 2020 comedy movie Miami Bici, which had 550,000+ cinema admissions in just three weeks, during late February-early March 2020, just before the cinemas in Romania closed because of the COVID-19 pandemic. The 2022 comedy movie Teambuilding, surpassed one million cinema admissions in January 2023, becoming the first Romanian film since The Second Fall of Constantinople in 1994 to surpass this threshold. From 1 January 2023, the film was also distributed on the Netflix platform. The 2022 comedy movie Mirciulică also gained a big audience. The movie had 320,000+ cinema admissions.

2022 was a good year for Romanian horror movies as well, with the horror movie Capra cu trei iezi amassing 128,503 cinema admissions.

== Romanian co-productions/International filming location ==
Romania has also been chosen by various international filmmakers as a tv series/movie location, such as the 2022 Netflix series Wednesday, the 2003 American epic period war film Cold Mountain, the 2006 French drama film Transylvania, the 2018 American horror film The Nun and the 2020 fantasy film Dragonheart: Vengeance, among many others.

== See also ==
- List of Romanian films
- MediaPro Studios
- MediaPro Pictures
- Castel Film Romania
- Cinema of Europe
- List of Romanian film and theatre directors

== Bibliography ==
1) Cantacuzino, Ion. "Momente din trecutul filmului românesc" (Moments from Romanian cinema's past). Sections covering up to 1947.

2) Caranfil, Tudor. Memorii și studii (Memoirs and studies)

3) Georgescu, Jean. Memorii și studii (Memoirs and studies)

4) Mihail, Jean. Memorii și studii (Memoirs and studies)

Memorii și studii (Memoirs and studies), belong to ANF (Arhiva Națională de Filme, in English: National Movie Archive)

5) "Filme noi" (New movies) bulletins. Covers the 1948-1989 section: Edited for internal use by RomâniaFilm (RADEF). Contains various articles and distribution rules.

6) Different editions of the magazine "Cinema"

A comprehensive bibliography of Romanian Cinema can be found here.
