= Gopo Awards =

Romanian film awards

- Awarded for: Best in film
- Country: Romania
- Presented by: Association for Romanian Film Promotion
- First award: 2007
- Website: gopoawards.com

The Gopo Awards (Romanian: Premiile Gopo) are the national Romanian film awards, similar to the Academy Awards (US), the Goya Awards (Spain), or the César Award (France). They are presented by the Association for Romanian Film Promotion and were inaugurated in 2007.

== Trophy ==
Established in 2007, the Gopo Awards were named in honour of Romanian film director Ion Popescu-Gopo, also celebrating the 50th anniversary of his winning a prize in the Cannes Film Festival.The trophy is a sculpture by Romanian artist Adrian Ilfoveanu representing Gopo's Little Man, the main character of Gopo's animation films. The Gopo Awards honour the best Romanian cinematic achievements of the previous year (or, in the case of the "Best European Film" award, the best European film distributed in Romania in the previous year).

== Categories ==
- Best Feature Film
- Best director
- Best screenplay
- Best actor
- Best actress
- Best actor in supporting role
- Best actress in supporting role
- Best cinematography
- Best film editing
- Best sound
- Best original music score
- Best art direction
- Best costume design
- Best documentary film
- Best short film
- Best debut
- Best box office success
- Life achievement
- Best European film

== Selected winners ==
Best film

- 2007 12:08 East of Bucharest (Corneliu Porumboiu)
- 2008 4 Months, 3 Weeks and 2 Days (Cristian Mungiu)
- 2009 The Rest Is Silence (Nae Caranfil)
- 2010 Police, Adjective (Corneliu Porumboiu)
- 2011 If I Want to Whistle, I Whistle (Florin Șerban)
- 2012 Aurora (Cristi Puiu)
- 2013 Everybody in Our Family (Radu Jude)
- 2014 Child's Pose (Călin Peter Netzer)
- 2015 Closer to the Moon (Nae Caranfil)
- 2016 Aferim! (Radu Jude)
- 2017 Sieranevada (Cristi Puiu)
- 2018 One Step Behind the Seraphim (Daniel Sandu)
- 2019 Moromeții 2 (Stere Gulea)
- 2020 The Whistlers (Corneliu Porumboiu)
- 2021 Collective (Alexander Nanau)
- 2022 Bad Luck Banging or Loony Porn (Radu Jude)
- 2023 Men of Deeds (Paul Negoescu)
- 2024 Libertate (Tudor Giurgiu)
- 2025 The New Year That Never Came (Bogdan Mureșanu)
- 2026 Kontinental '25 (Radu Jude)

Best director

- 2007 Corneliu Porumboiu for 12:08 East of Bucharest
- 2008 Cristian Mungiu for 4 Months, 3 Weeks and 2 Days
- 2009 Radu Muntean for Boogie
- 2010 Corneliu Porumboiu for Police, Adjective
- 2011 Florin Șerban for If I Want to Whistle, I Whistle
- 2012 Cristi Puiu for Aurora
- 2013 Radu Jude for Everybody in Our Family
- 2014 Călin Peter Netzer for Child's Pose
- 2015 Nae Caranfil for Closer to the Moon
- 2016 Radu Jude for Aferim!
- 2017 Cristi Puiu for Sieranevada
- 2018 Daniel Sandu for One Step Behind the Seraphim
- 2019 Constantin Popescu for Pororoca
- 2020 Corneliu Porumboiu for The Whistlers
- 2021 Alexander Nanau for Collective
- 2022 Cristi Puiu for Malmkrog
- 2023 Paul Negoescu for Men of Deeds
- 2024 Tudor Giurgiu for Libertate
- 2025 Bogdan Mureșanu for The New Year That Never Came
- 2026 Radu Jude for Kontinental '25

Best actor

- 2007 Ion Sapdaru – 12:08 East of Bucharest
- 2008 Răzvan Vasilescu – California Dreamin'
- 2009 Dragoș Bucur – Boogie
- 2010 Dragoș Bucur – Police, Adjective
- 2011 Victor Rebengiuc – Medal of Honor
- 2012 Adrian Titieni – Din dragoste cu cele mai bune intenții
- 2013 Șerban Pavlu – Everybody in Our Family
- 2014 Victor Rebengiuc – The Japanese Dog
- 2015 Florin Piersic Jr. – Quod Erat Demonstrandum
- 2016 Teodor Corban – Aferim!
- 2017 Gheorghe Visu – Dogs
- 2018 Vlad Ivanov – One Step Behind the Seraphim
- 2019 Bogdan Dumitrache – Pororoca
- 2020 Iulian Postelnicu – Arrest
- 2021 Mihai Călin – 5 Minutes Too Late
- 2022 Bogdan Farcaș – Unidentified
- 2023 Iulian Postelnicu – Men of Deeds
- 2024 Alex Calangiu – Libertate
- 2025 Adrian Văncică – The New Year That Never Came
- 2026 Ben Schnetzer – The Yellow Tie

Best actress

- 2007 Dorotheea Petre – Ryna
- 2008 Anamaria Marinca – 4 Months, 3 Weeks and 2 Days
- 2009 Anamaria Marinca – Boogie
- 2010 Hilda Péter – Katalin Varga
- 2011 Mirela Oprișor – Tuesday, After Christmas
- 2012 Ana Ularu – Outbound
- 2013 not awarded
- 2014 Luminița Gheorghiu – Child's Pose
- 2015 Ofelia Popii – Quod Erat Demonstrandum
- 2016 Ioana Flora – Acasă la tata
- 2017 Dana Dogaru – Sieranevada
- 2018 Diana Cavallioti – Ana, mon amour
- 2019 Cosmina Stratan – Love 1. Dog
- 2020 Judith State – Monsters
- 2021 Diana Cavallioti – 5 Minutes Too Late
- 2022 Katia Pascariu – Bad Luck Banging or Loony Porn
- 2023 Andreea Grămoșteanu – #dogpoopgirl
- 2024 Ilinca Manolache – Do Not Expect Too Much from the End of the World
- 2025 Nicoleta Hâncu – The New Year That Never Came
- 2026 Eszter Tompa – Kontinental '25

Best screenplay

- 2007 Corneliu Porumboiu - 12:08 East of Bucharest
- 2008 Cristian Nemescu, Tudor Voican - California Dreamin'
- 2009 Nae Caranfil - The Rest Is Silence
- 2010 Corneliu Porumboiu - Police, Adjective
- 2011 Tudor Voican - Medal of Honor
- 2012 Cristi Puiu - Aurora
- 2013 Radu Jude, Corina Sabău - Everybody in Our Family
- 2014 Răzvan Rădulescu, Călin Peter Netzer - Child's Pose
- 2015 Nae Caranfil - Closer to the Moon
- 2016 Radu Jude, Florin Lăzărescu - Aferim!
- 2017 Cristi Puiu - Sieranevada
- 2018 Daniel Sandu - One Step Behind the Seraphim
- 2019 Radu Jude - I Do Not Care If We Go Down in History as Barbarians
- 2020 Corneliu Porumboiu - The Whistlers
- 2021 Dorian Boguță, Loredana Novak – Legacy
- 2022 Iulian Postelnicu, Bogdan George Apetri – Unidentified
- 2023 Radu Romaniuc and Oana Tudor – Men of Deeds
- 2024 Cecilia Ștefănescu and Tudor Giurgiu – Libertate and Radu Jude – Do Not Expect Too Much from the End of the World (tied)
- 2025 Bogdan Mureșanu – The New Year That Never Came
- 2026 Igor Cobileanski and Alin Boeru – Comatogen

Lifetime achievement

- 2007 Lucian Pintilie
- 2008 Jean Constantin
- 2009 Elisabeta Bostan, Marin Moraru
- 2010 Draga Olteanu Matei
- 2011 Ion Besoiu
- 2012 Iurie Darie
- 2013 Mitică Popescu
- 2014 Radu Beligan
- 2015 Coca Bloos
- 2016 Florin Piersic
- 2017 Valentin Uritescu
- 2018 George Mihăiță, Vladimir Găitan
- 2019 Ileana Stana-Ionescu
- 2020 Adela Mărculescu
- 2021 Costel Constantin
- 2022 Victor Rebengiuc, Mariana Mihuț
- 2023 Mircea Andreescu
- 2024 Rodica Mandache

Best European film

- 2007 Volver (Pedro Almodóvar) (Spain)
- 2008 13 Tzameti (Géla Babluani (Georgia)
- 2009 I Served the King of England (Jiří Menzel) (Czech Republic)
- 2010 Gomorrah (Matteo Garrone) (Italy)
- 2011 The White Ribbon (Michael Haneke) (Germany)
- 2012 Melancholia (Lars von Trier) (Denmark)
- 2013 not awarded
- 2014 Amour (Michael Haneke) (France)
- 2015 The Great Beauty (Paolo Sorrentino) (Italy)
- 2016 Leviathan (Andrey Zvyagintsev) (Russia)
- 2017 Son of Saul (Laszlo Nemes) (Hungary)
- 2018 On Body and Soul (Ildikó Enyedi) (Hungary)
- 2019 The Killing of a Sacred Deer (Yorgos Lanthimos) (UK / Ireland)
- 2020 Pain and Glory (Pedro Almodóvar) (Spain)
- 2021 Sorry We Missed You (Ken Loach) (UK / France / Belgium)
- 2022 Another Round (Thomas Vinterberg) (Denmark)
- 2023 Vortex (Gaspar Noé) (France / Belgium / Monaco)
- 2024 Anatomy of a Fall (Justine Triet) (France)

== See also ==
- List of film awards
- Film festival
