= Romanian New Wave =

Genre of realist films

- Years active: 2004–present
- Location: Romania
- Major figures: Cristian Mungiu, Cristi Puiu, Cristian Nemescu, Cătălin Mitulescu, Radu Muntean, Corneliu Porumboiu, Călin Peter Netzer, Radu Jude, Alexander Nanau, Adina Pintilie, Radu Mihăileanu

The Romanian New Wave (Romanian: Noul val românesc) is a genre of realist and often minimalist films made in Romania since the mid-2000s, starting with two award-winning shorts by two Romanian directors, namely Cristi Puiu's Cigarettes and Coffee, which won the Short Film Golden Bear at the 2004 Berlin International Film Festival, and Cătălin Mitulescu's Trafic, which won the Short Film Palme d'Or at the Cannes Film Festival later that same year.

== Themes ==
Aesthetically, Romanian New Wave films share an austere, realist and often minimalist approach. Furthermore, black humour tends to feature prominently. While several of them are set in the late 1980s, near the end of Nicolae Ceaușescu's totalitarian rule over communist Romania, exploring themes of freedom and resilience (4 Months, 3 Weeks and 2 Days, The Paper Will Be Blue, The Way I Spent the End of the World, Tales from the Golden Age), others, however (The Death of Mr. Lazarescu, California Dreamin', Tuesday, After Christmas), unfold in modern-day Romania, and delve into the ways the transition to democracy and free-market capitalism has shaped Romanian society after the fall of communism in late 1989.

== Award-winning films and directors ==
Romanian New Wave films and directors have won a significant number of important international movie awards at prestigious FIAPF-accredited film festivals. Below are a few notable examples:

Year	Title	Director	Awards
1998	Train of Life; Trenul vieţii	Radu Mihăileanu	Won Best Foreign Film at the 1998 David di Donatello Awards; Won the Anicaflash and FIPRESCI Awards at the 55th Venice International Film Festival
2003	A Trip to the City; Călătorie la oraș	Corneliu Porumboiu	Won the Second Cinefondation Award at the 2004 Cannes Film Festival
2004	Cigarettes and Coffee; Un cartuș de Kent și un pachet de cafea	Cristi Puiu	Won the Short Film Golden Bear at the 2004 Berlin International Film Festival
2004	Trafic	Cătălin Mitulescu	Won the Short Film Palme d'Or at the 2004 Cannes Film Festival
2005	The Death of Mr. Lazarescu; Moartea Domnului Lăzărescu	Cristi Puiu	Won the Un Certain Regard at the 2005 Cannes Film Festival; The first feature film to bring the emerging movement into the international spotlight.
2006	The Way I Spent the End of the World; Cum mi-am petrecut sfârșitul lumii	Cătălin Mitulescu	Won the Best Actress Award in the Un Certain Regard section at the 2006 Cannes Film Festival
2006	12:08 East of Bucharest; A fost sau n-a fost?	Corneliu Porumboiu	Won the Caméra d'Or at the 2006 Cannes Film Festival
2007	4 Months, 3 Weeks and 2 Days; 4 luni, 3 săptămâni și 2 zile	Cristian Mungiu	Won the Palme d'Or at the 2007 Cannes Film Festival
2007	California Dreamin'	Cristian Nemescu	Won the Un Certain Regard at the 2007 Cannes Film Festival
2008	Hooked; Pescuit sportiv	Adrian Sitaru	Won in the New Voices/New Vision section at the 2008 Palm Springs International Film Festival
2008	A Good Day for a Swim; O zi bună de plajă	Bogdan Mustață	Won the Short Film Golden Bear at the 2008 Berlin International Film Festival
2008	Megatron	Marian Crișan	Won the Short Film Palme d'Or at the 2008 Cannes Film Festival
2009	The Happiest Girl in the World; Cea mai fericită fată din lume	Radu Jude	Won the CICAE Forum Award at the 2009 Berlin International Film Festival
2009	Le Concert; Concertul	Radu Mihăileanu	Won the Southwest Audience Award for Best Narrative feature at the Nashville Film Festival
2009	Police, Adjective; Polițist, Adjectiv	Corneliu Porumboiu	Won the Jury Prize in the Un Certain Regard section at the 2009 Cannes Film Festival
2010	If I Want to Whistle, I Whistle; Eu când vreau să fluier, fluier	Florin Șerban	Won the Jury Grand Prix Silver Bear at the 2010 Berlin International Film Festival
2010	Aurora	Cristi Puiu	Won the East of the West Award at the 2010 Karlovy Vary International Film Festival
2010	Morgen	Marian Crișan	Won the Special Jury Prize at the 2010 Locarno International Film Festival
2010	Outbound; Periferic	Bogdan George Apetri	Won the FIPRESCI Award at the 2010 Warsaw International Film Festival
2010	Tuesday, After Christmas; Marți, după Crăciun	Radu Muntean	Won the Best Actress Award at the 2010 Mar del Plata International Film Festival
2011	Best Intentions; Din dragoste cu cele mai bune intenții	Adrian Sitaru	Won the Leopard for Best Direction at the 2011 Locarno International Film Festival
2012	Beyond the Hills; După dealuri	Cristian Mungiu	Won the Golden Ástor at the 2012 Mar del Plata International Film Festival; Won both the Best Screenplay and the Best Actress Award at the 2012 Cannes Film Festival
2013	Child's Pose; Poziția copilului	Călin Peter Netzer	Won the Golden Bear at the 2013 Berlin International Film Festival
2013	In the Fishbowl; În acvariu	Tudor Cristian Jurgiu	Won the Third Cinefondation Award at the 2013 Cannes Film Festival
2015	Aferim!	Radu Jude	Won the Silver Bear for Best Director at the 2015 Berlin International Film Festival
2015	The Treasure; Comoara	Corneliu Porumboiu	Won the Un Certain Talent in the Un Certain Regard section at the 2015 Cannes Film Festival
2015	Box	Florin Șerban	Won the FIPRESCI Award at the 2015 Karlovy Vary International Film Festival
2016	Dogs; Câini	Bogdan Mirică	Won the FIPRESCI Award in the Un Certain Regard section at the 2016 Cannes Film Festival
2016	Graduation; Bacalaureat	Cristian Mungiu	Won the Best Director Award at the 2016 Cannes Film Festival
2016	Sieranevada	Cristi Puiu	Won both the Gold Hugo and the Silver Hugo at the 2016 Chicago International Film Festival
2016	Scarred Hearts; Inimi cicatrizate	Radu Jude	Won the Special Jury Prize at the 2016 Locarno International Film Festival; Won the Best Director Award at the 2016 Mar del Plata International Film Festival
2017	Pororoca	Constantin Popescu	Won the Silver Seashell for Best Actor at the 2017 San Sebastián International Film Festival
2017	Ana, mon amour	Călin Peter Netzer	Won the Silver Bear for Outstanding Artistic Contribution at the 2017 Berlin International Film Festival
2018	Touch Me Not; Nu mă atinge-mă	Adina Pintilie	Won the Golden Bear at the 2018 Berlin International Film Festival
2018	I Do Not Care If We Go Down in History as Barbarians; Îmi este indiferent dacă în istorie vom intra ca barbari	Radu Jude	Won the Crystal Globe at the 2018 Karlovy Vary International Film Festival
2020	Malmkrog	Cristi Puiu	Won the Best Director Award in the Encounters section at the 2020 Berlin International Film Festival
2021	Bad Luck Banging or Loony Porn; Babardeală cu bucluc sau porno balamuc	Radu Jude	Won the Golden Bear at the 2021 Berlin International Film Festival
2024	Three Kilometres to the End of the World; Trei kilometri până la capătul lumii	Emanuel Pârvu	Won the Queer Palm at the 2024 Cannes Film Festival
2024	The New Year That Never Came; Anul Nou care n-a fost	Bogdan Mureșanu	Won the Orizzonti Award at the 2024 Venice International Film Festival
2025	Kontinental '25	Radu Jude	Won the Silver Bear for Best Screenplay at the 2025 Berlin International Film Festival
2026	Fjord	Cristian Mungiu	Won the Palme d'Or at the 2026 Cannes Film Festival

Legend:

Best feature film
Best short film or second-best feature film
Best film director

== Other notable works ==
Year	Director	Title	Notes
2001	Cristi Puiu	Stuff and Dough; Marfa și banii	Cristi Puiu's directorial debut
2002	Nae Caranfil	Philanthropy; Filantropica	
2002	Cristian Mungiu	Occident	Cristian Mungiu's first feature film
2003	Lucian Pintilie	Niki and Flo; Niki Ardelean, colonel în rezervă	Lucian Pintilie's last feature film
2004	Corneliu Porumboiu	Liviu's Dream; Visul lui Liviu	
2006	Tudor Giurgiu	Love Sick; Legături bolnăvicioase	Compared to My Summer of Love
2006	Cristian Nemescu	Marilena from P7; Marilena de la P7	Cristian Nemescu's last short film
2006	Radu Muntean	The Paper Will Be Blue; Hârtia va fi albastră	
2007	Gheorghe Preda	An Angel Hooked on Me; Îngerul necesar	Thematically unrelated to the others. Unconcerned with social issues.
2008	Radu Muntean	Boogie	
2009	Cristian Mungiu et al.	Tales from the Golden Age; Amintiri din Epoca de Aur	
2009	Răzvan Rădulescu et al.	First of All, Felicia; Felicia, înainte de toate	
2009	Bobby Păunescu	Francesca	
2009	Andrei Gruzsniczki	The Other Irene; Cealaltă Irina	
2009	Călin Peter Netzer	Medal of Honor; Medalia de onoare	
2010	Constantin Popescu	Portrait of the Fighter as a Young Man; Portretul luptătorului la tinerețe	
2011	Cătălin Mitulescu	Loverboy	
2012	Radu Jude	Everybody in Our Family; Toată lumea din familia noastră	
2012	Tudor Giurgiu	Of Snails and Men; Despre oameni și melci	
2013	Corneliu Porumboiu	When Evening Falls on Bucharest or Metabolism; Când se lasă seara peste București sau metabolism	
2014	Nae Caranfil	Closer to the Moon; Mai aproape de lună	
2015	Ana Lungu	Self-Portrait of a Dutiful Daughter; Autoportretul unei fete cuminți	
2015	Radu Muntean	One Floor Below; Un etaj mai jos	
2015	Tudor Giurgiu	Why Me? De ce eu?	
2019	Corneliu Porumboiu	The Whistlers; La Gomera	
2019	Alexander Nanau	Collective; Colectiv	First Romanian film to be nominated for an Academy Award
