= Alexandru Dabija =

Romanian stage director and actor

- Born: February 13, 1955 (age 71); Piatra Neamț, Romania
- Education: I.L. Caragiale Institute of Theatre and Film Arts
- Occupations: Actor; Film director
- Awards: National Order of Faithful Service (2000); Gopo Award for Best Supporting Actor (2016)

Alexandru Dabija (born February 13, 1955) is a stage director and actor in Romanian theater and film.

Born in Piatra Neamț, he graduated from the I.L. Caragiale Institute of Theatre and Film Arts in Bucharest. Dabija debuted in 1976 with Philip Massinger's Reflection at the Youth Theater in Piatra Neamț, winning the Best Director of the Year award. He was general manager of the Odeon Theatre in Bucharest from 1991 to 1994 and from 1996 to 2002.

== Theater plays directed ==
- Avram Iancu, made by Mihai Măniuțiu (Casandra Theater Studio, 1978)
- Taifunul, by Cao Yu (Nottara Theatre, 1988)
- Burghezul gentilom, by Molière (Nottara Theatre, 1989)
- Ospățul lui Balthazar, by Benjamin Fondane (Nottara Theatre, 1990)
- Lola Blau, by Georg Kreisler (State Jewish Theater, 1993)
- Lungul drum al zilei către noapte, by Eugene O'Neill (Nottara Theatre, 1998)
- Școala femeilor, by Molière (Teatrul Mic, 1998)
- Jucăria de vorbe, a scenario, directed by Alexandru Dabija, after "Cartea cu jucării" by Tudor Arghezi (Odeon Theatre, 1998)
- Saragosa, 66 de Zile, adapted by Dabija from The Manuscript Found in Saragossa by Jan Potocki (Odeon Theatre and Theater der Welt Festival in Berlin, 1999)
- Gaițele, by Alexandru Kirițescu (Odeon Theatre, 2002)
- București nicăieri, a script by Tudor Arghezi and Horia-Roman Patapievici (Act Theatre, 2002)
- ...escu, by Tudor Mușatescu (The Comedy Theatre, 2002)
- Aici nu se simte, by Lia Bugnar (Teatrul Luni de la Green Hours, 2003)
- Leonce and Lena, by Georg Büchner (Odeon Theatre, 2004)
- Trei surori, by A.P. Cehov (Toma Caragiu Drama Theatre, Ploiești, 2004)
- Aventurile lui Habarnam, by Nikolay Nosov (Odeon Theatre, 2005)
- Block Bach, (Teatrul Odeon, 2007)
- Camera de hotel, a trilogy by Barry Gifford (Odeon Theatre, 2008)
- Un duel, by Anton Chekhov (TNB, 2009)
- Pyramus & Thisbe 4 You, after William Shakespeare (Odeon Theatre, 2010)
- Absolut! after Ivan Turbincă, by Ion Creangă (Teatrul Act, 2011)
- O scrisoare pierdută, by Ion Luca Caragiale (Teatrul de Comedie, 2011)
- C.F.R. — Cometa, Copilul și Cățelul, after the texts by Ion Luca Caragiale (Odeon Theatre, 2012)
- Două loturi, by Ion Luca Caragiale (TNB, 2012)
- Titanic Vals, by Tudor Mușatescu (Odeon Theatre, 2013)
- Suflete moarte, by Nikolai Gogol (Toma Caragiu Drama Theater, Ploiești, 2013)
- Sânziana & Pepelea, by Vasile Alecsandri (Cluj-Napoca National Theatre, 2013)
- Mein Kampf, by George Tabori (Cluj-Napoca National Theatre, 2014)
- Contra democrației, by Esteve Soler (Sala Studio, 2014)
- 13 tablouri cu oameni, adapted after Anton Chekhov (Elvira Godeanu Theater, Târgu Jiu, 2014)
- Logodnicii din provincie, by Georges Feydeau (Hungarian Theatre of Cluj, 2014)
- O...ladă, collective creation by Ion Creangă (Youth Theater in Piatra Neamț, 2014)
- Vârciorova. Carantina, by Vasile Alecsandri and Matei Millo (Bacovia Municipal Theater, Bacău, 2014)
- Platonov, by Anton Chekhov (Radu Stanca National Theatre, Sibiu, 2016)

== Filmography ==
- 2013 — O umbră de nor – short feature – directed by Radu Jude
- 2015 — Aferim!, directed by Radu Jude, the role of boyar Iulian Cîndrescu
- 2016 — Inimi cicatrizate (English: Scarred Hearts), a scenario directed by Radu Jude, the role of Mr. Lazăr B.
- 2018 - "Seagull" - short feature - directed by Maria Popistașu
- 2018 - "I Do Not Care If We Go Down in History as Barbarians" - directed by Radu Jude

== Awards ==
In December 2000 he was awarded by then-Pres. Emil Constantinescu the National Order of Faithful Service, Officer rank.

In 2008 he was awarded with National Award for Arts together with Mircea Cărtărescu and Cristian Mungiu

For his performance as boyar Iordache Cîndescu from the film Aferim! (by director Radu Jude, released in 2015), Dabija was rewarded with the Gopo Award for Best Supporting Actor at Gopo Gala 2016.

For his performance as Mr. Movila from the film I Do Not Care If We Go Down in History as Barbarians (by director Radu Jude, released in 2018, Dabija was rewarded with the Gopo Award for Best Supporting Actor at Gopo Gala 2018.

He was rewarded with 5 UNITER AWARDS from 1995 to 2012
