= Eight Postcards from Utopia =

2024 documentary by Radu Jude

- Directed by: Radu Jude; Christian Ferencz-Flatz
- Produced by: Alexandru Teodorescu
- Edited by: Cătălin Cristuțiu
- Production company: Saga Film
- Distributed by: Heretic
- Release date: 10 August 2024 (Locarno)
- Running time: 71 minutes
- Country: Romania
- Budget: €268,000

Eight Postcards from Utopia (Romanian: Opt ilustrate din lumea ideală) is a 2024 Romanian documentary film directed by Radu Jude and philosopher Christian Ferencz-Flatz.

== Premise ==
Composed entirely of found footage drawn from post-communist Romanian advertisements, Eight Postcards from Utopia explores the human condition through the context of Romanian economic transition. The film is divided into eight thematic segments followed by an epilogue.

== Production ==
Post-production on Eight Postcards from Utopia took place in late 2023. The film was supported in part by a grant from the Romanian Film Centre.

== Release ==
Eight Postcards from Utopia debuted out of competition in the Fuori Concorso section of the 77th Locarno Film Festival on 10 August 2024. The film screened at the festival alongside another new work by Jude, Sleep #2, under the title Paradise Dreams: 2 Found-footage Films.

In July 2024, Heretic acquired the film for international distribution.
