= Scarred Hearts =

- Poster
- Romanian: Inimi cicatrizate
- Directed by: Radu Jude
- Written by: Radu Jude
- Based on: Inimi cicatrizate (Scarred Hearts) by Max Blecher
- Produced by: Ada Solomon
- Starring: Șerban Pavlu; Gabriel Spahiu
- Cinematography: Marius Panduru
- Edited by: Catalin Cristutiu
- Production companies: Hi Film Productions; Komplizen Film
- Release date: 7 August 2016 (LIFF)
- Running time: 141 minutes
- Countries: Romania; Germany
- Language: Romanian

Scarred Hearts (Romanian: Inimi cicatrizate) is a 2016 Romanian-German biographical film based on the eponymous novel by Max Blecher.

== Premise ==
In 1937 in a Romanian sanatorium a Jewish writer is being treated for tuberculosis.

== Cast ==
- Lucian Teodor Rus — Emanuel
- Ivana Mladenovic — Solange
- Ilinca Hărnuț — Isa
- Șerban Pavlu — Doctor Ceafalan
- Gabriel Spahiu — Zed

== Reception ==
On review aggregator website Rotten Tomatoes, the film holds an approval rating of 78%, based on 18 reviews with an average rating of 7.7/10. On Metacritic, Scarred Hearts has a score of 70 out of a 100 based on 7 critics, indicating "generally favorable reviews".

Clayton Dillard of Slant Magazine wrote "Despite the film's bleak premise, writer-director Radu Jude finds dark humor within the certainty of death". Ben Kenigsberg of The New York Times added "It's the rare page-to-screen adaptation in which the camera becomes an essential character".

According to Jay Weissberg of Variety, "The former's narrative drive was strong enough to minimize concerns over possible information gaps, the latter's unannotated immersion coupled with its episodic structure suggests the film won't have the same pull".

Richard Brody, in his review for The New Yorker, finds that "The director, Radu Jude, unfolds his horrific treatments—long needles, tight wraps, and a full-body cast—with an unflinching specificity that contrasts with the theatrical tableaux of life in the lavish facility. The medical regimen is the backdrop for a slow-motion whirl of intellectuals, politicians, and socialites who turn the hospital into a microcosm of European sicknesses of the soul. "

=== Awards ===
At the 2017 Gopo Awards, Scarred Hearts won for Best Cinematography (Marius Panduru) (award shared ex aequo with Andrei Butică for Dogs); Best Art Direction (Cristian Niculescu); Best Costumes (Dana Păpăruz); and Best Make-up and Hairstyling (Bianca Boeroiu, Domnica Bodogan).
