= Uppercase Print =

2020 film

- Directed by: Radu Jude
- Release date: 21 February 2020
- Running time: 128 minutes
- Country: Romania
- Language: Romanian

Uppercase Print (Romanian: Tipografic majuscul) is a 2020 Romanian drama film directed by Radu Jude. It is based on the real story of Mugur Călinescu, who, in 1981, wrote a series of texts against Nicolae Ceaușescu's dictatorship on the walls with chalk and was denounced by his friends. His story is staged as Gianina Cărbunariu reconstructed it from his Securitate file; this material is interspersed with images of Romanian life taken from the National Television archive from the same period.

== Cast ==
- Șerban Lazarovici – Mugur Călinescu
- Ioana Iacob – The mother
- Șerban Pavlu – The father
- Bogdan Zamfir – Securitate Officer
