= The Happiest Girl in the World (film) =

Cea mai fericită fată din lume
- Directed by: Radu Jude
- Written by: Radu Jude; Agustina Stanciu
- Produced by: Ada Solomon, assistant: Dragos Vilcu
- Starring: Andreaa Bosneag; Doru Catanescu
- Cinematography: Marius Panduru
- Edited by: Catalin Cristutiu
- Distributed by: Piramide Distribution (International), Soda Pictures (UK)
- Release dates: February 7, 2009 (Berlinale); May 8, 2009 (Romania)
- Running time: 95 minutes
- Country: Romania
- Language: Romanian

The Happiest Girl in the World (Romanian: Cea mai fericită fată din lume) is a 2009 Romanian film by Radu Jude. It is a part of the Romanian New Wave.

== Plot ==
Delia comes to Bucharest with her parents to collect a prize, a car, she has won in a contest organized by a soft-drinks company. All Delia has to do is appear in a commercial. All goes well until it becomes clear that Delia and her parents have different intentions for the new car. Meanwhile, the sponsor needs a radiant prize-winner with a gleaming smile.

== See also ==
- Romanian New Wave
