= One Step Behind the Seraphim =

- Directed by: Daniel Sandu
- Starring: Ștefan Iancu; Vlad Ivanov
- Release date: 22 September 2017
- Running time: 150 minutes
- Country: Romania
- Language: Romanian

One Step Behind the Seraphim (Romanian: Un pas în urma serafimilor) is a 2017 Romanian drama film directed by Daniel Sandu. It tells the story of Gabriel, a teenager who wants to become a priest.
