= Arhiva Națională de Filme =

Film archive in Bucharest, Romania

Arhiva Națională de Filme is a film archive located in Bucharest, Romania. It is a member of the Association of European Film Archives and Cinematheques.
