= Gabriel Spahiu =

Romanian actor

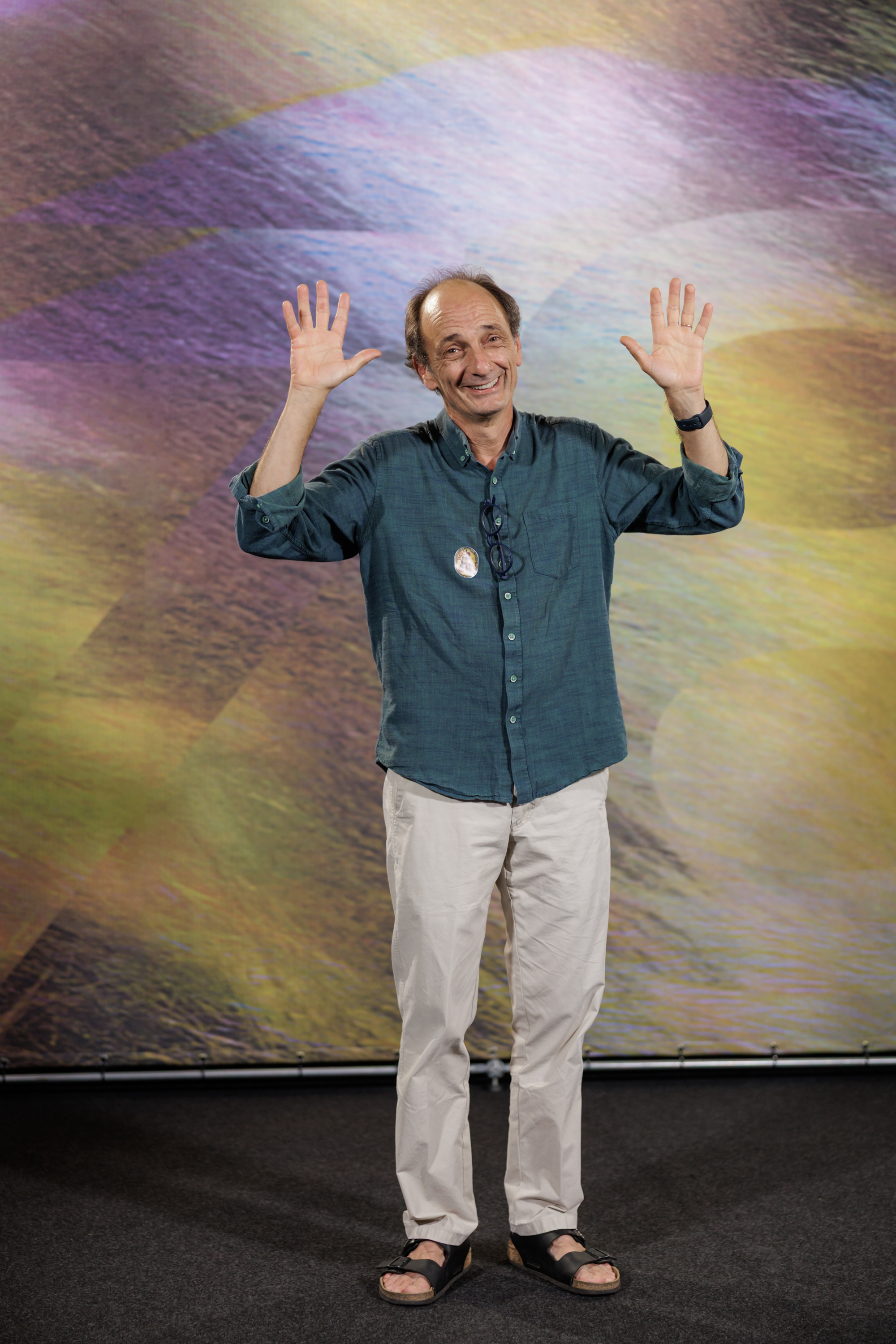
- Born: 21 March 1968 (age 58); Bucharest, Romania
- Education: University of Bucharest; I. L. Caragiale National University of Theatre and Film
- Occupation: Actor
- Years active: 1998–present

Gabriel Spahiu (Romanian pronunciation: [ɡabriˈel spaˈhi.u]; born 21 March 1968) is a Romanian actor. He appeared in more than eighty films since 1998.

Born in Bucharest, he graduated from the city's Saint Sava High School in 1986. From 1987 to 1992, he attended the Faculty of Mathematics of the University of Bucharest, and from 1992 to 1996 the Academy of Theatre and Film. From 2011 to 2014, he was a university assistant and artistic consultant at the Film Faculty of the Academy, and in 2014, he obtained his PhD under the direction of Florin Mihăilescu, with the thesis "The actor at the intersection of communication".

Spahiu was chosen by Sony Pictures Animation to dub Wayne in the animated movies Hotel Transylvania, Hotel Transylvania 2 and Hotel Transylvania 3.

== Selected filmography ==
| Year | Title | Role | Notes |
|---|---|---|---|
| 1998 | Phantom Town | Hotel clerk | |
| 1998 | Terminus Paradis | Nelu | |
| 2001 | Everyday God Kisses Us On The Mouth | The gambler | |
| 2002 | Occident | The mute Spaniard | |
| 2002 | Amen. | Inmate | |
| 2002 | Callas Forever | Reporter | |
| 2002 | Garcea și oltenii | Garcea's father | |
| 2003 | Examen | Witness #1 | |
| 2003 | Tancul | The fool | |
| 2004 | Straight into Darkness | The lunatic priest | |
| 2004 | The Death of Mr. Lazarescu | Leo, the ambulance driver | |
| 2006 | Marilena from P7 | Andrei's father | |
| 2007 | California Dreamin' | The trade union chief | |
| 2009 | Raise Your Head | Radu | |
| 2009 | Rise of the Gargoyles | Workman #2 | |
| 2009 | Tales from the Golden Age | Neighbor | |
| 2011 | Hello! How Are You? | Iorgu | |
| 2012 | Everybody in Our Family | Aurel | |
| 2016 | War Dogs | Enver | |
| 2016 | Scarred Hearts | Zed | |
| 2016 | 03.ByPass | Doru, the ambulance driver | |
| 2022 | Hai hui în timp | Costel | |
| 2023 | I Don't Love You Anymore | Homeless man | |
| 2024 | The New Year That Never Came | Benghe | |
| 2024 | Buzz House: The Movie | | |
| 2025 | Kontinental '25 | Ion | Selected in competition of 75th Berlin International Film Festival and will have its world premiere in February 2025. |
| 2025 | Dracula | | The film will have its world premiere at the Locarno in August, in the Main Competition section, where it competes for Golden Leopard. |
| TBA | What Happens at Night | | Post-Production |
