= L'Indépendance Roumaine =

Former newspaper

L'Indépendance Roumaine ("The Romanian Independence") was a French language liberal daily newspaper published from Bucharest. The newspaper was founded in 1877.
