= I Do Not Care If We Go Down in History as Barbarians =

2018 film

- Theatrical release poster
- Directed by: Radu Jude
- Written by: Radu Jude
- Starring: Ioana Iacob
- Cinematography: Marius Panduru
- Edited by: Catalin Cristutiu
- Distributed by: Micro Film
- Release dates: 2 July 2018 (KVIFF); 28 September 2018 (Romania)
- Running time: 160 minutes
- Countries: Romania; Czech Republic; Germany; Bulgaria; France
- Language: Romanian
- Box office: $39,177

I Do Not Care If We Go Down in History as Barbarians (Romanian: Îmi este indiferent dacă în istorie vom intra ca barbari) is a 2018 black comedy film written and directed by Radu Jude. The title is pulled from a speech by Romanian Minister of Foreign Affairs Mihai Antonescu to the Council of Ministers preceding the 1941 Odessa massacre.

== Plot ==
Theatre director Mariana Marin is planning a dramatic reenactment of the events surrounding the 1941 Odessa massacre, in which tens of thousands of Jews were murdered by the fascist regime of Marshal Ion Antonescu with the support of the Einsatzgruppen. She spends much of her time selecting costumes, props and sound effects, coaching and rehearsing with her largely non-professional cast, and conducting research.

Mariana discovers that she might be pregnant from her affair with a married pilot, who is unenthusiastic about her artistic undertaking. Their relationship is severely damaged in the aftermath. During the rehearsals, some reenactors take issues with her directing style, her firm stance against Antonescu apologia, and her choice to work with Roma actors. Constantin Movilă, a representative from the municipal government, expresses concerns over the potential backlash over its content. Mariana is adamant that Romanians must fully accept their country's well-documented responsibility for deportations and mass murder. Movilă, while conceding that her script is historically accurate, engages in whataboutism and attempts to persuade her to tone down and to relativise the crimes of the regime. Their debates come to a head when Movilă threatens to cancel the event altogether. Mariana eventually agrees to some cuts and reluctantly accepts a date with him.

On the day of the performance, the actors act out—as Mariana has secretly planned in advance—the scene where Romanian soldiers massacre the Jews, leaving Movilă and the deputy mayor in attendance visibly unsettled. Public reception is mixed, and Mariana is distraught when some audience members outwardly express their bigotry and even applaud the massacre. After the show, she accepts Movilă's congratulations as well as his gift, a book on the Herero genocide, which she flips through half-heartedly.

== Cast ==
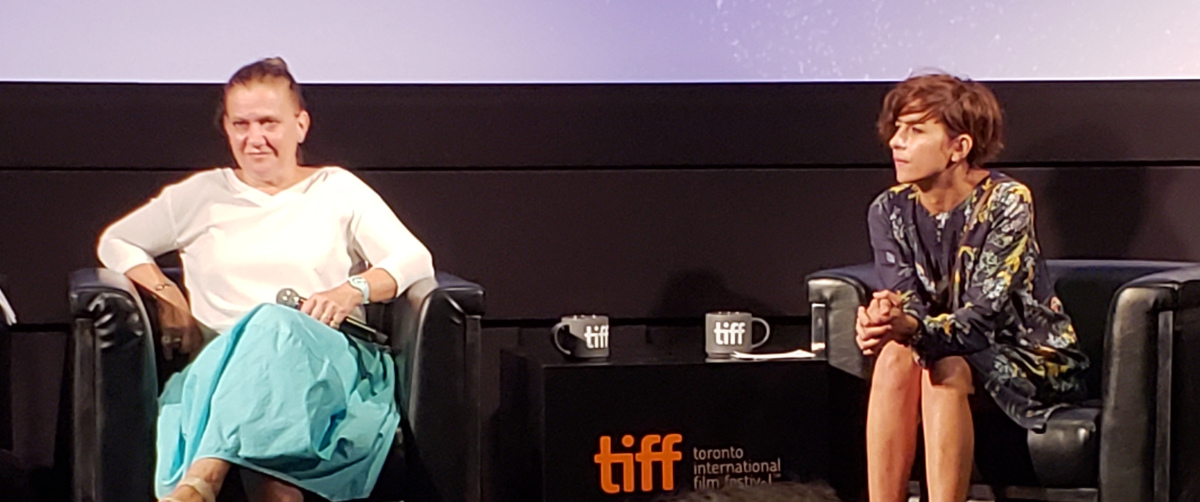
Leading actress Ioana Iacob (right) with producer Ada Solomon (left) discuss the film at the Toronto International Film Festival

- Ioana Iacob as Mariana
- Alex Bogdan as Traian
- Alexandru Dabija as Movila

== Production ==
In the film, a stylized reenactment of the Romanian campaign on Odessa is played on the forecourt (now a parking lot) in front of the Royal Palace of Bucharest.

== Accolades ==
The film was selected as the Romanian entry for the Best Foreign Language Film at the 91st Academy Awards, but it was not nominated. It won the Crystal Globe for the best feature film at the 2018 Karlovy Vary International Film Festival.

== See also ==
- List of submissions to the 91st Academy Awards for Best Foreign Language Film
- List of Romanian submissions for the Academy Award for Best Foreign Language Film
- 1941 Odessa massacre
