= Trafic (2004 film) =

- Directed by: Cătălin Mitulescu
- Screenplay by: Cătălin Mitulescu; Andreea Valean
- Produced by: Cătălin Mitulescu
- Starring: Bogdan Dumitrache; Maria Dinulescu
- Cinematography: Marius Panduru
- Edited by: Ion Ioachim Stroe
- Music by: Mihai Bogos; Calin Potcoava
- Production company: Strada Film
- Release date: October 15, 2004 (US)
- Running time: 15 minutes
- Country: Romania
- Language: Romanian

Trafic is a 2004 Romanian short film directed by Cătălin Mitulescu. It depicts a brief moment in the mundanities of urban life and family life, and a man's quick decision to escape them, if only just for a moment. It won the Short Film Palme d'Or at the 2004 Cannes Film Festival. It is said to have been the "instigating" film of the Romanian New Wave.

== See also ==
- Romanian New Wave
