= Kontinental '25 =

2025 Romanian comedy drama film

- International promotional poster
- Directed by: Radu Jude
- Written by: Radu Jude
- Produced by: Alexandru Teodorescu; Rodrigo Teixiera
- Starring: Eszter Tompa; Gabriel Spahiu; Adonis Tanța; Oana Mardare; Șerban Pavlu
- Cinematography: Marius Panduru
- Edited by: Cătălin Cristutiu
- Music by: Matei Teodorescu
- Production companies: Saga Film; RT Features; Bord Cadre Films; Sovereign Films; Paul Thiltges Distributions
- Distributed by: Sovereign Films (United Kingdom)
- Release date: 19 February 2025 (Berlin)
- Running time: 109 minutes
- Countries: Romania; Brazil; Switzerland; United Kingdom; Luxembourg
- Languages: Romanian; Hungarian; German
- Box office: $147,784

Kontinental '25 is a 2025 Romanian absurdist black comedy-drama film written and directed by Radu Jude. It stars Eszter Tompa as a bailiff in Cluj-Napoca who faces a moral crisis when a homeless man she has evicted kills himself. Its title is inspired by the Roberto Rossellini film Europe '51.

An international co-production between Romania, Brazil, Switzerland, the United Kingdom, and Luxembourg, the film had its world premiere at the main competition of the 75th Berlin International Film Festival on 19 February 2025, where it won the Silver Bear for Best Screenplay.

== Synopsis ==
In Cluj, bailiff Orsolya evicts a homeless man living in the basement of a building, leading to his suicide. Consumed by guilt, Orsolya begins a desperate search for understanding.

== Cast ==
- Eszter Tompa as Orsolya
- Gabriel Spahiu as Ion
- Adonis Tanța as Fred
- Oana Mardare as Dorina
- Șerban Pavlu as Priest Șerban
- Annamária Biluska as Orsolya's mother
- Adrian Sitaru
- Marius Damian
- Nicodim Ungureanu
- Ilinca Manolache as Irina
- Dan Ursu
- Vlad Semenescu
- Daniel Paleacu
- Theodor Graur
- Marius Panduru

== Themes ==
The film examines Romania's housing crisis, post-socialist economics, and nationalism. The protagonist's moral ambiguity reflects contemporary societal malaise.

== Release ==
Kontinental '25 had its world premiere on 19 February 2025, as part of the 75th Berlin International Film Festival, in Competition.

Paris-based Luxbox acquired the sales rights of the film in January 2025.

It competed in the official competition Grand Prix competition at the Luxembourg City Film Festival on 8 March, 2025.

The film was also screened at the CPH:DOX 2025 documentary film festival in PARA:FICTIONS section in March 2025.

The film was screened in Les Auteurs at the 49th Hong Kong International Film Festival on 12 April 2025.

The film featured at the 72nd Sydney Film Festival in the Features section on 4 June 2025. The film was also part of Horizons section of the 59th Karlovy Vary International Film Festival, where it was screened from 4 July to 10 July 2025. In August it was showcased at the 31st Sarajevo Film Festival in 'In Focus' section.

The film also made it to the Main Slate of the 2025 New York Film Festival, where it had its North American Premiere on 4 October 2025. The film was screened in 'The Essentials' for its North American Premiere at the 2025 Festival du nouveau cinéma on 9 October 2025.

On 11 October 2025, it was presented in Panorama section of 2025 Vancouver International Film Festival. It was also presented in 'Strands: Debate' section of the 2025 BFI London Film Festival on 17 October 2025.

It competed in the International Feature Competition of the 61st Chicago International Film Festival for Golden Hugo on 19 October 2025.

It was also screened in International Perspective at the São Paulo International Film Festival on 17 October 2025. It will be presented in 'From The Festivals - 2025' section of the 56th International Film Festival of India in November 2025.

== Reception ==
On the review aggregator website Rotten Tomatoes, 92% of 59 critics' reviews are positive, with an average rating of 7.3/10. Metacritic, which uses a weighted average, assigned the film a score of 78 out of 100, based on 14 critics, indicating "generally favorable" reviews.

== Accolades ==
| Award | Date of ceremony | Category | Recipient | Result | Ref. |
|---|---|---|---|---|---|
| Berlin International Film Festival | 23 February 2025 | Golden Bear | Kontinental '25 | Nominated | |
| Berlin International Film Festival | 23 February 2025 | Silver Bear for Best Screenplay | Radu Jude | Won | |
| Luxembourg City Film Festival | 16 March 2025 | The Grand Prix | Kontinental '25 | Nominated | |
| Chicago International Film Festival | 24 October 2025 | Golden Hugo | Kontinental '25 | Nominated | |
| Chicago International Film Festival | 24 October 2025 | Silver Hugo Award for Best Actress | Eszter Tompa | Won | |
