= Bad Luck Banging or Loony Porn =

2021 Romanian comedy film

- Film poster
- Romanian: Babardeală cu bucluc sau porno balamuc
- Directed by: Radu Jude
- Written by: Radu Jude
- Produced by: Ada Solomon
- Starring: Katia Pascariu; Claudia Ieremia; Olimpia Mălai
- Cinematography: Marius Panduru
- Edited by: Cătălin Cristuțiu
- Music by: Jura Ferina; Pavao Miholjević
- Production companies: microFILM; Paul Thiltges Distributions; Endorfilm; Kinorama; Bord Cadre Films; Sovereign Films
- Release date: 2 March 2021 (Berlinale)
- Running time: 106 minutes
- Countries: Romania; Luxembourg; Czech Republic; Croatia; Switzerland; United Kingdom
- Languages: Romanian; English
- Budget: €930,000
- Box office: $452,718

Bad Luck Banging or Loony Porn (Romanian: Babardeală cu bucluc sau porno balamuc) is a 2021 satirical comedy drama film written and directed by Radu Jude, and produced by Ada Solomon. It stars Katia Pascariu, Claudia Ieremia and Olimpia Mălai.

The film had its worldwide premiere at the 71st Berlin International Film Festival in March 2021 and won the Golden Bear in the main competition section. It is the third Romanian film to win the Golden Bear in the last nine years. It was selected as the Romanian entry for the Best International Feature Film at the 94th Academy Awards.

== Plot ==
Emi Cilibiu, a history teacher at a prominent Romanian secondary school, films a sex tape with her husband Eugen. Eugen uploads the video to a private fetish site, from which it is downloaded and repeatedly posted to public porn sites. The staff at Emi's school, as well as the parents of her students, are scandalized by her behavior, and they call her to a parent-teacher conference in the evening on a day soon after the video is widely circulated. Emi spends the day before the conference running various errands and growing increasingly frustrated at the sexist, nationalist, and consumerist aspects of Romanian society, as well as the additional social stressors imposed by the effects of the COVID-19 pandemic.

A montage follows, depicting the director's definitions or thoughts on various related concepts or objects. Some observations are humorous (for social distancing, a clip of a traditional Romanian folk dance modified to comply with distance regulations is shown), some are more bitter (for the French Revolution and the Romanian Revolution, violent scenes from the events are depicted followed by shots of commercial products named after the events), and some are outright caustic (for efficiency, a 24/7 funeral home is shown, open and attracting a long line, directly opposite a hospital, presumably one that houses coronavirus patients). A few of the definitions involve depictions of graphic nudity or unsimulated sex acts.

Emi arrives at the parent-teacher conference, where she is informed by a sympathetic administrator that the parents and teachers will be voting on whether or not the school should continue to employ her in light of her supposed "moral transgression;" if a majority vote against her, she will be expected to resign. The parents, among them a retired Romanian Army lieutenant, a jet pilot with fascist political leanings, a socially conservative priest, a "nice guy" who defends Emi in an attempt to ingratiate himself to her, and a woman who has previously offered bribes to Emi in exchange for higher grades, are generally critical of Emi's actions. In condemning Emi's behavior and teaching style, the parents express vulgar and sexist attitudes towards women, Romaphobia, antisemitism, and question historical evidence Emi invokes to contradict their points.

The film concludes by presenting three alternate endings in sequence. In the first, Emi is "acquitted" by the parents and teachers, leading to a physical confrontation between her and another parent. In the second, she is "convicted," and resigns without incident. In the third, she is again "convicted," but transforms into a superhero resembling Wonder Woman. She traps the parents and teachers in a net, and forces those who had most harshly opposed her during the conference to fellate a dildo.

== Cast ==
The cast include:

- Katia Pascariu as Emi
- Claudia Ieremia as The Principal
- Olimpia Mălai as Mrs. Lucia
- Nicodim Ungureanu as Mr. Gheorghescu
- Alexandru Potocean
- Andi Vasluianu as Mr. Otopeanu
- Ion Dichiseanu as himself

== Release ==
On 11 February 2021, Berlinale announced that the film would have its worldwide premiere at the 71st Berlin International Film Festival in the Berlinale Competition section, in March 2021.

== Reception ==
The review aggregator website Rotten Tomatoes surveyed 93 critics and, categorizing the reviews as positive or negative, assessed 84 as positive and 9 as negative for a 90% rating. Among the reviews, it determined an average rating of 7.30 out of 10. The critics consensus reads "As playfully provocative as its title, Bad Luck Banging or Loony Porn uses a potentially prurient premise to highlight the hypocrisy of societal norms". On Metacritic, the film has a weighted average score of 75 out of 100, based on 21 critics, indicating "generally favorable reviews".

== See also ==
- List of submissions to the 94th Academy Awards for Best International Feature Film
- List of Romanian submissions for the Academy Award for Best International Feature Film
