= Cătălin Mitulescu =

Romanian film director (born 1972)

Cătălin Mitulescu (Romanian pronunciation: [kətəˈlin mituˈlesku]; born 13 January 1972 in Bucharest) is a Romanian film director. He graduated from the Caragiale National University of Theatre and Film in Bucharest in 2001.

He is best known for the short film Trafic (Romanian for "traffic"), which won him the Short Film Palme d'Or at the 2004 Cannes Film Festival and for the debut feature The Way I Spent the End of the World (Romanian: Cum mi-am petrecut sfârşitul lumii), which was screened at the 2006 festival. His latest film Loverboy premiered in the Un Certain Regard section at the 2011 Cannes Film Festival.
