= Everybody in Our Family =

2012 film by Radu Jude

- Directed by: Radu Jude
- Screenplay by: Radu Jude; Corina Sabău
- Produced by: Ada Solomon
- Starring: Șerban Pavlu; Sofia Nicolaescu; Gabriel Spahiu; Mihaela Sîrbu
- Cinematography: Andrei Butică
- Edited by: Cătălin F. Cristuțiu
- Release date: February 13, 2012 (Berlin Film Festival Forum)
- Running time: 109 minutes
- Country: Romania
- Language: Romanian

Everybody in Our Family (Romanian: Toată lumea din familia noastră) is a 2012 Romanian psychological thriller drama directed by Radu Jude.

== Synopsis ==
Marius is a divorced man in his late thirties. His five-year-old daughter lives with her mother, her mother's new husband and parents, much to Marius' frustration. Every little thing Marius (Șerban Pavlu) does is meant to serve one purpose only: to make the intended trip to the seaside with his daughter Sofia come true. Little by little, and despite his attempts to face ever mounting troubles, Marius loses battle after battle—with his parents, his former mother-in-law, his ex-wife Otilia (Mihaela Sîrbu), and her new partner.

Director Radu Jude (The Happiest Girl in the World, A Film for Friends) expands on the theme explored in his 2007 short Alexandra in this bitterly ironic and intelligently choreographed drama. Marius’ erratic movements beautifully illustrate his state of confusion. He turns from victim to aggressor, and the scene of this sudden transition displays both raw energy and directorial mastery. Everything happens in the name of the family, which is exactly the thing that seems to matter the least to everybody.

== Cast ==
- Șerban Pavlu as Marius Vizureanu
- Sofia Nicolaescu as Sofia Vizureanu
- Mihaela Sîrbu as Otilia
- Gabriel Spahiu as Aurel
- Tamara Buciuceanu-Botez as Coca
- Stela Popescu as Mrs. Vizureanu
- Alexandru Arșinel as Mr. Vizureanu
- Adina Cristescu as pharmacist #1
- Andreea Boșneag as pharmacist #2
- Silviu Mircescu as bodyguard
- Coca Bloos (voice) as neighbour

== Awards ==
2012 Sarajevo Film Festival

- The Heart of Sarajevo Award for Best Film

2012 CinEast

- Grand Prix CinEast 2012

2012 Anonimul film festival

- Grand prix award for best feature film
