= Șerban Pavlu =

Romanian actor

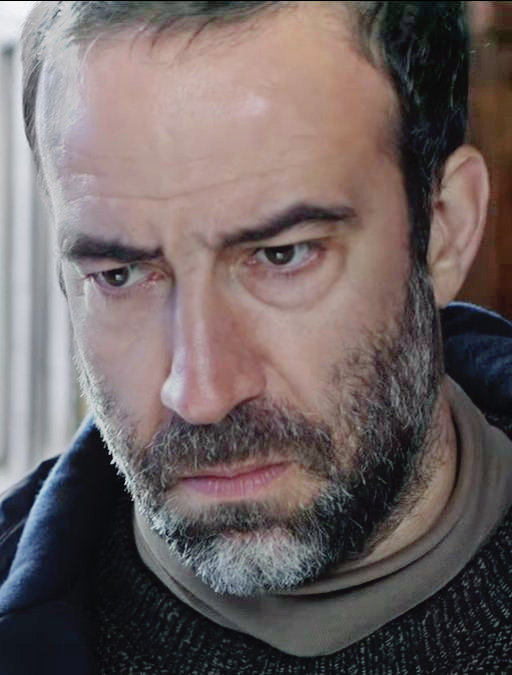
- Portrait of Șerban Pavlu
- Born: 29 June 1975 (age 51); Bucharest, Romania
- Occupation: Actor
- Years active: 1995-present

Șerban Pavlu (Romanian pronunciation: [ʃerˈban ˈpavlu]; born 29 June 1975) is a Romanian actor. He has appeared in more than thirty films since 1995. He is well known for the successful TV series Umbre broadcast on HBO, his role in the soap opera "Fetele Marinarului" and in the television format "În puii mei", which aired on Antena1.

In 2008, the actor was chosen by DreamWorks Animation to provide the Romanian voice of Po in the animated movie Kung Fu Panda.

== Selected filmography ==
| Year | Title | Role | Notes |
|---|---|---|---|
| 2003 | Niki and Flo | Eugen Tufara | |
| 2008 | Silent Wedding | | |
| 2012 | Everybody in Our Family | | |
| 2013 | The Japanese Dog | | |
| 2015 | Aferim! | | |
| 2019 | Monsters. | | |
| 2019 | Zavera | Nic | |
| 2022 | Teambuilding | Oprea | |
| 2022–2023 | DNA | Lazâr | |
| 2025 | Kontinental '25 | Priest Șerban | Selected in competition of 75th Berlin International Film Festival and had its world premiere on 19 February 2025. |
| 2025 | Dracula | Dracula Priest | The film had its world premiere at the Locarno in August 2025, in the Main Competition section, where it competed for the Golden Leopard. |
| 2025 | April X | Klein | |
