= Ada Solomon =

Romanian film producer

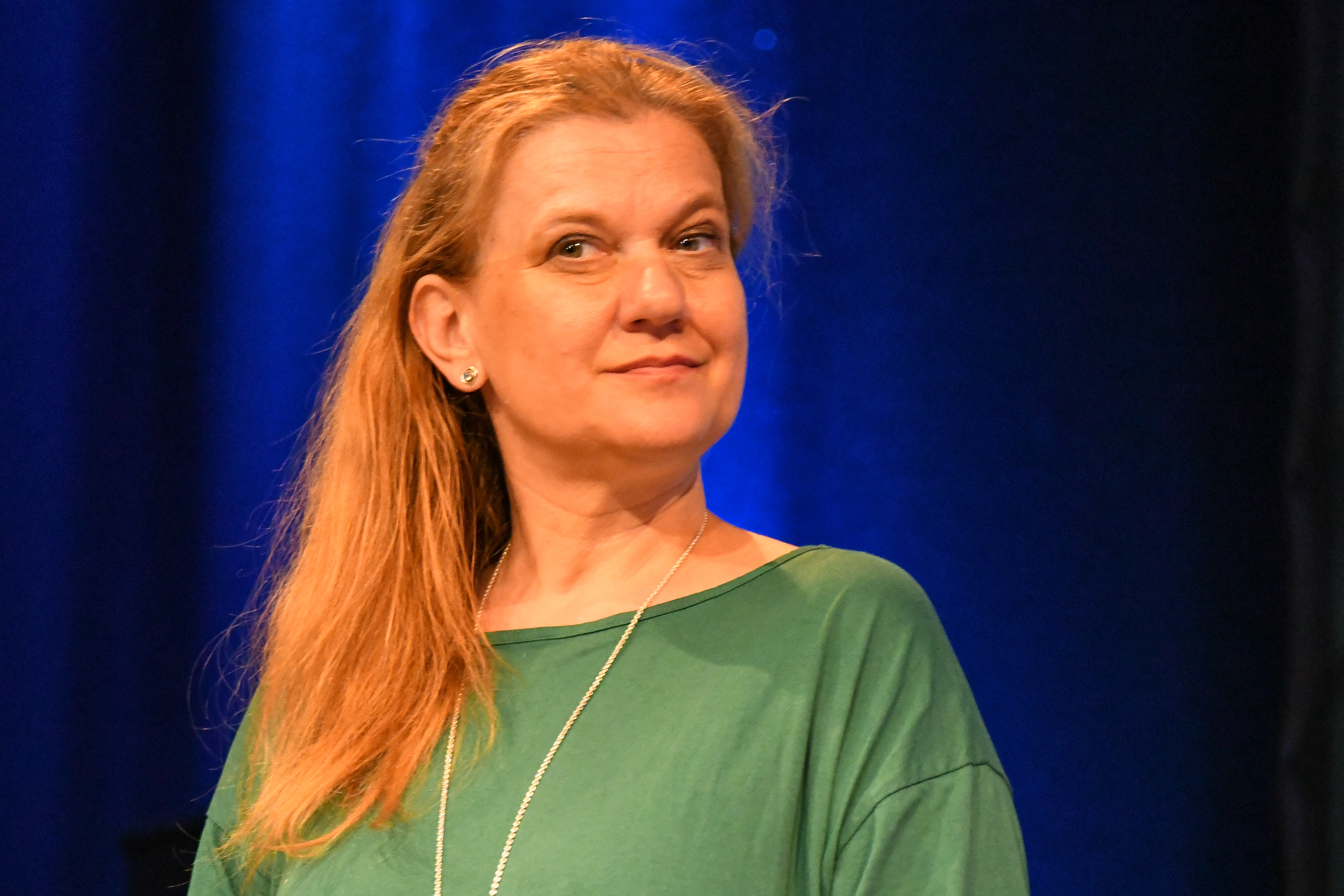
- Solomon in 2018
- Born: June 3, 1968 (age 58); Bucharest, Romania
- Education: Bucharest Construction Academy
- Occupation: Film producer

Ada Solomon (born 3 June 1968 in Bucharest) is a Romanian film producer behind over 60 movies. After first working in marketing, she turned to media companies in 1993 and produced her first film Asphalt Tango in 1995. In 2004 she created HiFilm Productions where she has worked with directors including Franco Zeffirelli. Solomon was the Romanian executive producer of the highly successful co-production Toni Erdmann (2016) directed by Maren Ade.

== Early life ==
Born in Bucharest on 3 June 1968, Solomon graduated from the city's Ion Creangă High School. In 1991, she graduated in environmental engineering from the Bucharest Construction Academy.

== Career ==
Solomon worked as a sales agent in the early 1990s and for media companies from 1993. In 1995, she became director of the production for Nae Caranfil's Asphalt Tango. She went on to produce numerous Romanian films and collaborated with international partners in connection with projects such as Zeffirelli's Callas Forever (2002) or Didi Danquart's Offset (2006).

In 2004, Solomon founded the Romanian company HiFilm Productions. In 2006, in memory of the recently deceased Cristian Nemescu, a producer, and Andrei Toncu, a sound specialist, she created the NexT International Film Festival in Bucharest. In 2017, as a result of her role as executive Romanian producer of Toni Erdmann, Solomon became the first Romanian producer to be associated with an Oscar-nominated film.

Solomon has held a number of significant posts including deputy chair of the European Film Academy, executive president of the European Women's Audiovisual Network and the Romanian representative of EAVE (European Audiovisual Entrepreneurs). In 2013, she was the winner of the Prix Eurimages for co.production at the European Film Awards.

== Awards and honors ==
For the short films Lampa cu căciulă (winner at the 2007 Gopo Awards) and O umbră de nor (winner at the 2015 Gopo Awards), both written and directed by Radu Jude, the producer was awarded the Gopo Award for Best Short Film.

For the feature films Everybody in Our Family (released in 2012, directed by Radu Jude, winner at the 2013 Gopo Awards), Child’s Pose (released in 2013, directed by Călin Peter Netzer, winner at the 2014 Gopo Awards) and Aferim! (released in 2015, directed by Radu Jude, winner at the 2016 Gopo Awards), the Romanian producer was awarded the Gopo Award for Best Feature Film on three occasions. At the 2026 Venice International Film Festival, she produced the feature film I Matter, directed by Alina Șerban and won the Audience Award..

Ada Solomon is a member of the European Film Academy and in 2023 was selected by The Hollywood Reporter for its list of the 40 most influential women in the international film industry (The 40 Most Influential Women in International Film).
