= Aferim! =

2015 film directed by Radu Jude

- Theatrical release poster
- Directed by: Radu Jude
- Written by: Radu Jude; Florin Lăzărescu
- Produced by: Ada Solomon
- Starring: Teodor Corban; Mihai Comănoiu; Toma Cuzin; Alexandru Dabija; Luminița Gheorghiu; Victor Rebengiuc; Alberto Dinache; Mihaela Sîrbu; Alexandru Bindea; Adina Cristescu; Șerban Pavlu; Gabriel Spahiu; Dan Nicolaescu; Liviu Ornea
- Music by: Dana Bunescu
- Distributed by: Parada Film; Micro Film; Big World Pictures (USA)
- Release dates: 11 February 2015 (Berlin); 6 March 2015 (Romania)
- Running time: 108 minutes
- Countries: Romania; Bulgaria; Czech Republic; France
- Language: Romanian
- Box office: $350,110

Aferim! (English: Bravo!) is a 2015 Western tragicomedy film co-written and directed by Radu Jude and produced by Ada Solomon. It was screened in the main competition section of the 65th Berlin International Film Festival, where Radu Jude won the Silver Bear for Best Director. It was selected as the Romanian entry for the Best Foreign Language Film at the 88th Academy Awards.

== Plot ==
In 1835 Wallachia, aging constable Costandin is tasked to locate Carfin, a fugitive Roma slave accused of stealing from his master, the boyar Iordache. Traversing the countryside with his son and deputy Ioniță, Costandin comes across, among others, monks, Roma gold panners, a priest prone to spewing out stereotypes, and travellers massacred by hajduks. After bribing a constable in the neighbouring county for information, Costandin manages to track down Carfin at the home of a peasant craftsman. They also take into custody Țintiric, a child slave who ran away from his brutal master.

Carfin explains that he was in fact forced to flee after being seduced by Sultana, the boyar's wife. On the way back, he speaks of the hardships of his life and begs the lawmen to take him as their slave instead, fearing that the boyar will kill him. Costandin, while sympathetic, dismisses his concerns and assures him that he will only receive a beating and nothing more. They elect to sell Țintiric to a nobleman at a market against his wishes. Spending the night at an inn, Costandin reminisces about his past serving under Tudor Vladimirescu during the Wallachian uprising of 1821, arranges for Ioniță to sleep with a prostitute, before lying with the prostitute himself. Ioniță suggests that they let Carfin go but Costandin rejects the idea, arguing that they should follow the law, and that "you can't feed the wolf and save your lambs".

At the boyar's residence, Costandin learns of the abuses Sultana suffered at the hands of her husband. After receiving his pay, he asks Iordache to treat Carfin with leniency but is bluntly rebuffed. The boyar proceeds to publicly castrate Carfin, asks to have him paraded around town, and throws his testicles at Sultana. Quickly leaving the boyar's home, Costandin laments their inability to change the way of the world and assures Ioniță that he will get him into the army, and life will eventually be better.

== Cast ==
- Teodor Corban as Costandin
- Mihai Comănoiu as Ioniță
- Toma Cuzin as Carfin Pandolean
- Alexandru Dabija as Boyar Iordache Cîndescu
- Alberto Dinache as Țintiric
- Mihaela Sîrbu as Sultana
- Luminița Gheorghiu as Smaranda Cîndescu
- Alexandru Bindea as the priest on the road
- Victor Rebengiuc as Stan
- Gabriel Spahiu as Vasile
- Șerban Pavlu as the traveler

== Production ==
While the structure and the narrative had little in common with existing Romanian literature, the dialogue is often based on works by: Iordache Golescu, Anton Pann, Ion Creangă, Budai-Deleanu and Nicolae Filimon.

== Reception ==
On review aggregator website Rotten Tomatoes the film has an approval rating of 98% based on 76 critics, with an average rating of 7.9/10. The site's critics consensus reads: "Smart, visually arresting and scathingly funny, Aferim! depicts a world that many American filmgoers have never seen – but will still, in many respects, find utterly familiar". On Metacritic, the film have an above average score of 84 out of 100 based on 17 critics, indicating "universal acclaim".

Publication The Hollywood Reporter describes Radu Jude's film as "a harsh lesson of history, relieved by overlooked humor and classic Western elements". Variety magazine writes that Aferim! is "an exceptional and extremely intelligent insight into a crucial period of history, a film equally inspired and furious".

According to Jordan Hoffman of The Guardian, "this [film] with all its full-frontal historical horror, is still loaded with laughs".

A.O. Scott of The New York Times called Aferim! "brilliant" and "sublime", while Kit Gillet of the same periodical went as far as calling it "an Oscar contender".

== See also ==
- List of submissions to the 88th Academy Awards for Best Foreign Language Film
- List of Romanian submissions for the Academy Award for Best Foreign Language Film
- List of films featuring slavery
