= Radu Jude =

Romanian filmmaker

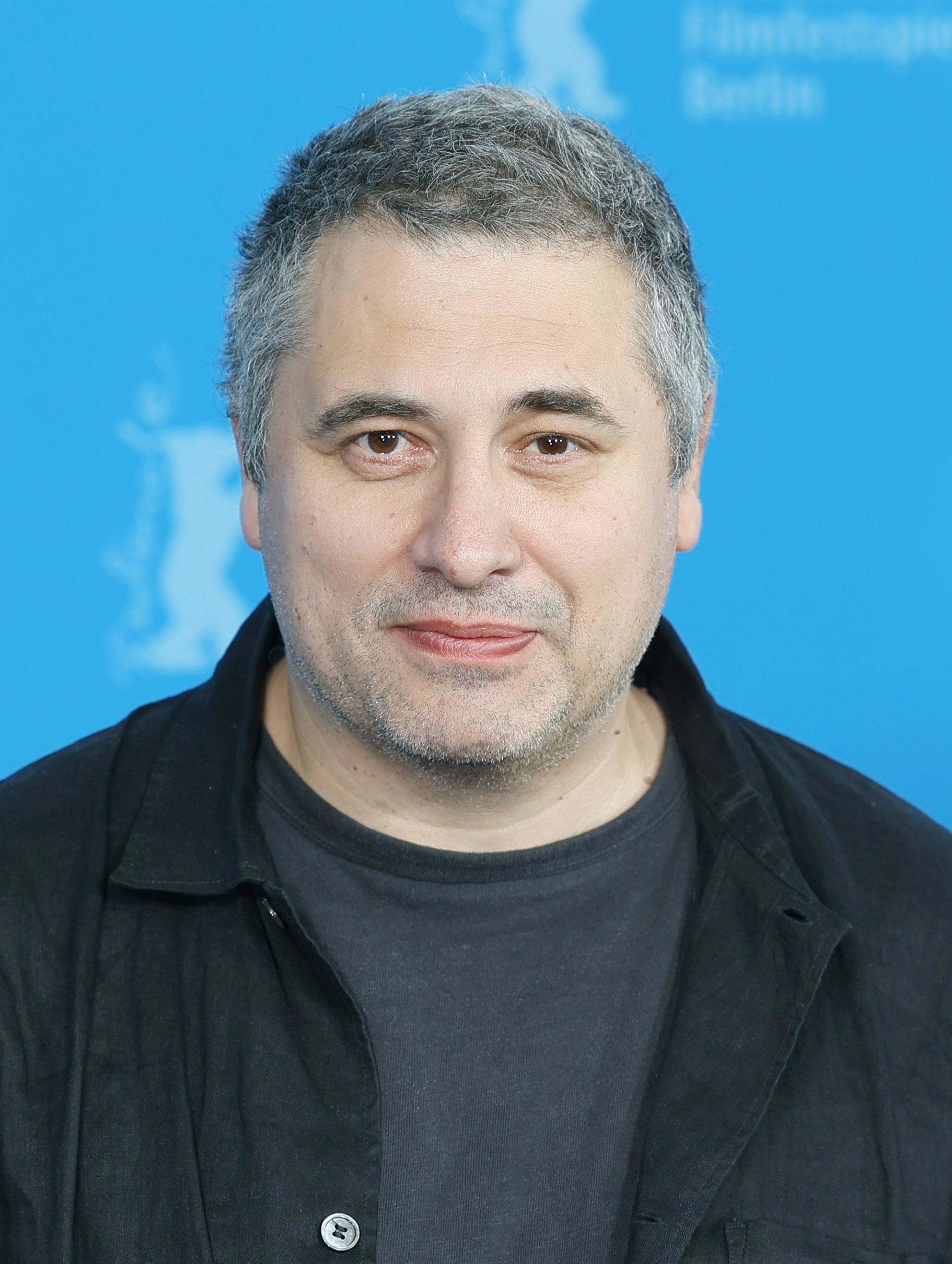
- Jude in 2025
- Born: 28 March 1977 (age 49); Bucharest, Romania
- Education: Media University of Bucharest
- Occupations: Director; Screenwriter
- Years active: 2002–present

Radu Jude (Romanian: [ˈradu ˈʒude]; born 28 March 1977) is a Romanian filmmaker. A figure in the Romanian New Wave, his films usually explore the country society and politics through comedy and satire.

He is most known for the comedy film Bad Luck Banging or Loony Porn (2021), which won the Golden Bear at the 71st Berlin International Film Festival. For Do Not Expect Too Much from the End of the World (2023) he won the Special Jury Prize at the 76th Locarno Film Festival.

== Biography ==
=== Early career ===
In 2003, Jude studied at the Film Directing Department at the Media University of Bucharest. He worked as an assistant director for feature films including Amen., directed by Costa-Gavras and The Death of Mr. Lazarescu, directed by Cristi Puiu. He directed several short films, among them Corp la corp (2003), Marea Neagră (2004), Lampa cu căciulă (2006) – the most awarded Romanian short film of all time, winner of grand prizes at Sundance, San Francisco, Los Angeles, Grimstad, Hamburg, Bilbao, Huesca, Trieste, Montpellier, Cottbus, Aspen, IndieLisboa, Brussels, Mediawave, Kraków, Almería, Valencia, Uppsala and selected, among others, at Toronto, Telluride, New Directors/New Films Festival, Tampere, Rotterdam. His short films Dimineața (2007) and Alexandra (2007) were selected in over 30 festivals, including Clermont-Ferrand, San Francisco, Cottbus, and Oberhausen (where he won the Grand Prix). Jude also directed over 100 commercials.

The Happiest Girl in the World is his feature debut. Before the theatrical release in Romania, Cea mai fericită fată din lume won the CICAE Prize at the Berlin International Film Festival, the FIPRESCI Award (International Federation of Film Critics) at the Sofia International Film Festival, the Prize for Best Screenplay at the Bucharest International Film Festival and FIPRESCI Prize at IndieLisboa. The film was selected in ACID Programme at 2009 Cannes Film Festival.

=== 2010s ===
His thriller film Everybody in Our Family (2012) premiered at the Forum section of the 62nd Berlin International Film Festival. It won the Heart of Sarajevo Award at the 2012 Sarajevo Film Festival.

Aferim! (2015), won the Silver Bear for Best Director at the 65th Berlin International Film Festival. It was also selected for the Tribeca Film Festival, Mill Valley Film Festival, Hong Kong International Film Festival, AFI Fest, and London Film Festival. It was selected as the Romanian entry for the Best Foreign Language Film at the 88th Academy Awards, reaching the December shortlist but was not nominated.

His biographical film Scarred Hearts (2016), won the Special Jury Prize at the 69th Locarno Film Festival. It also won the Best Director award at the Mar del Plata International Film Festival.

I Do Not Care If We Go Down in History as Barbarians (2018) won the Crystal Globe at the 53rd Karlovy Vary International Film Festival. It was selected as the Romanian entry for the Best Foreign Language Film at the 91st Academy Awards, but it was not nominated.

=== 2020s ===
Uppercase Print (2020) had its world premiere at the Forum section of the 70th Berlin International Film Festival. It follows Mugur Călinescu, a Romanian teenager who wrote protest graffiti messages against the communist regime of dictator Nicolae Ceaușescu and was subsequently arrested and interrogated by the secret police. The festival also featured his archival footage documentary film The Exit of the Trains, co-directed with Adrian Cioflâncă.

Bad Luck Banging or Loony Porn (2021) won the Golden Bear at the 71st Berlin International Film Festival. It follows Emi Cilibiu, a history teacher at a prominent Romanian secondary school, who has a sex tape with her husband leaked online. The film was selected as the Romanian entry for the Best International Feature Film at the 94th Academy Awards, but was not nominated.

An English-language monograph on Jude's work was published in 2023: Beyond the New Romanian Cinema: Romanian Culture, History, and the Films of Radu Jude, by Andrei Gorzo and Veronica Lazăr.

Do Not Expect Too Much from the End of the World (2023), won the Special Jury Prize at the 76th Locarno Film Festival, it follows Angela a young worker frustrated with Romania contemporary society dynamics. It was later screened at the 2023 Toronto International Film Festival and at the 2023 New York Film Festival. It ranked seventh on Cahiers du Cinéma's top 10 films of 2023, while IndieWire ranked the film at number 38 on its list of "The 100 Best Movies of the 2020s (So Far)". It was selected as Romanian entry for the Best International Feature Film category at the 96th Academy Awards, but was not nominated.

Eight Postcards from Utopia (2024), a documentary composed entirely of archival advertisement footage from post-communist Romania explored the country's economic transition. The film had its world premiere out of competition of the 77th Locarno Film Festival.

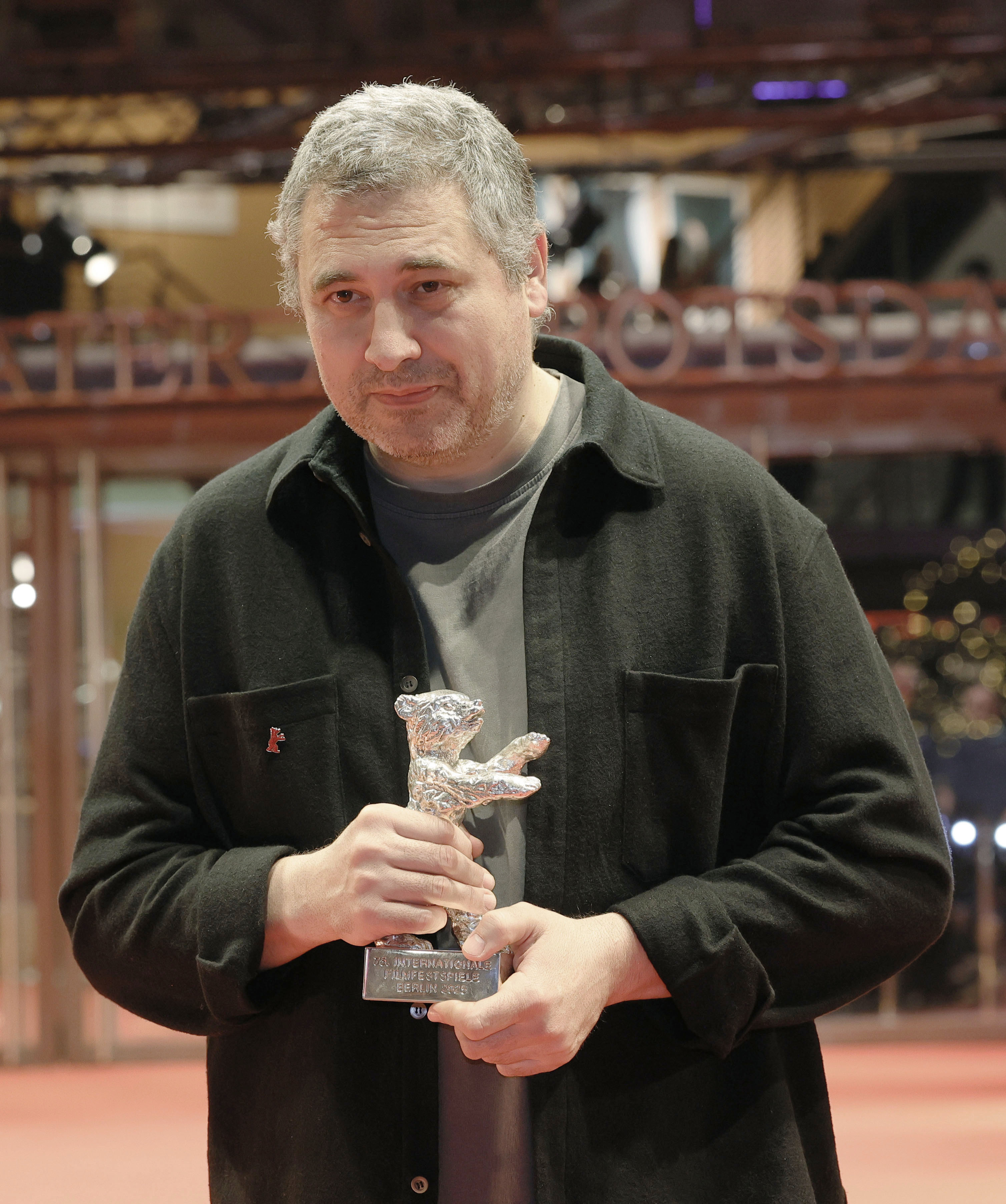
Jude during the 75th Berlin International Film Festival award ceremony

His drama film Kontinental '25 (2025), loosely inspired by the Roberto Rossellini film Europe '51 (1952), had its world premiere at the main competition of the 75th Berlin International Film Festival, where it won the Silver Bear for Best Screenplay. It follows a bailiff in Cluj-Napoca who faces a moral crisis when a homeless man she has evicted kills himself. It was Jude's first production shot on IPhone due to a tight budget.

Also in 2025, Jude released Dracula, loosely inspired by Bram Stoker's classic novel of same name. Set in contemporary Transylvania, it explores the echoes of the Dracula legend in Romanian society and politics. The film had its world premiere at the main competition of the 78th Locarno Film Festival in 2025, where it was nominated for Golden Leopard. Also shot on IPhone, the film drew controversy for its use of artificial intelligence, although it was used for satirical purposes.

His French-language debut feature, The Diary of a Chambermaid (2026), had its world premiere at the Directors' Fortnight section of the 2026 Cannes Film Festival. Starring Ana Dumitrașcu, Mélanie Thierry and Vincent Macaigne, it's loosely based on the novel of same name by Octave Mirbeau.

=== Upcoming projects ===
In 2025, Jude confirmed he would shoot Frankenstein in Romania, loosely inspired by the 1818 novel by Mary Shelley and starring Sebastian Stan. Like Jude's previous works, the film will explore contemporary Romania.

In 2026, Jude confirmed plans for filming Love Diptych, another feature film loosely inspired by the Roberto Rossellini works (1948's L'amore). Shooting took place between 10 to 24 June 2026, with a small budget of just half a million euros. It's expected to premiere in early 2027.

Jude is expected to premiere another film in 2027, Call a Large Hound Near, a "revenge story set between the village and the edge of a big city, inspired by two Romanian old ballads: Miorița and Șalga."

Also in 2026, Jude received €400,000 in backing for a future project named Heia, Heia, Safari, revolving around a German art student whose research into a 1917 German POW-camp for African colonial soldiers causes controversy at her university. The project is co-written with German writer and director Heleen Gerritsen.

== Personal life ==
=== Political beliefs ===
In December 2023, alongside 50 other filmmakers, Jude signed an open letter published in Libération demanding a ceasefire and an end to the killing of civilians amid the 2023 Israeli invasion of the Gaza Strip, and for a humanitarian corridor into Gaza to be established for humanitarian aid, and the release of hostages.

== Filmography ==
=== Feature films ===
Year	English title	Original title	Notes
2009	The Happiest Girl in the World	Cea mai fericită fată din lume	
2011	A Film for Friends	Film pentru prieteni	Also producer
2012	Everybody in Our Family	Toată lumea din familia noastră	
2015	Aferim!		
2016	Scarred Hearts	Inimi cicatrizate	
2018	I Do Not Care If We Go Down in History as Barbarians	Îmi este indiferent dacă în istorie vom intra ca barbari	
2020	Uppercase Print	Tipografic majuscul	
2021	Bad Luck Banging or Loony Porn	Babardeală cu bucluc sau porno balamuc	
2023	Do Not Expect Too Much from the End of the World	Nu aștepta prea mult de la sfârșitul lumii	Also producer
2025	Kontinental '25		
2025	Dracula		
2026	The Diary of a Chambermaid	Journal d'une femme de chambre	French-language debut
2027	Love Diptych	Cum vine blînda noapte	Post-production
TBA	Call a Large Hound Near	Mai cheamă și un câine	Pre-production
TBA	Heia, Heia, Safari!		Pre-production
TBA	Frankenstein in Romania		Pre-production

=== Documentary ===
Year	English title	Original title
2017	The Dead Nation	Țara moartă
2020	The Exit of the Trains	Ieșirea trenurilor din gară
2024	Eight Postcards from Utopia	Opt ilustrate din lumea ideală
2024	Sleep #2	

=== Short films ===
- Lampa cu căciulă (2006)
- Alexandra (2006)
- Dimineața (2007)
- O umbră de nor (2013)
- Trece și prin perete (2014)
- Plastic Semiotic (2021)
- The Potemkinists (2022)
- Greetings from Crîngasi (2023)
- Shot Reverse Shot (2026)

=== Television ===
- În familie (TV series, 2002)

=== Other credits ===
==== Only Writer ====
- Stanka se pribira vkashti (2010)
- My Tired Father (co-writer, 2011)
- Film pentru prieteni (writer, 2011)

==== Assistant director ====
- Amen. (2002)
- Furia (2002)
- The Death of Mr. Lazarescu (2005)

==== Actor ====
- The Unknown (2026)

== Accolades ==
Award	Date of ceremony	Category	Work	Result	Ref.
Berlin International Film Festival	15 February 2015	Golden Bear	Aferim!	Nominated	
Berlin International Film Festival	15 February 2015	Silver Bear for Best Director	Aferim!	Won	
Berlin International Film Festival	5 March 2021	Golden Bear	Bad Luck Banging or Loony Porn	Won	
Berlin International Film Festival	23 February 2025	Golden Bear	Kontinental '25	Nominated	
Berlin International Film Festival	23 February 2025	Silver Bear for Best Screenplay	Kontinental '25	Won	
Karlovy Vary International Film Festival	7 July 2018	Crystal Globe	I Do Not Care If We Go Down in History as Barbarians	Won	
Karlovy Vary International Film Festival	7 July 2018	Europa Cinemas Label Award	I Do Not Care If We Go Down in History as Barbarians	Won	
Locarno Film Festival	12 August 2023	Golden Leopard	Do Not Expect Too Much from the End of the World	Nominated	
Locarno Film Festival	12 August 2023	Special Jury Prize	Do Not Expect Too Much from the End of the World	Won	
Luxembourg City Film Festival	16 March 2025	The Grand Prix	Kontinental '25	Nominated	
