= Victor Rebengiuc =

Romanian actor (born 1933)

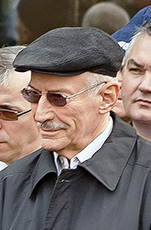
- Victor Rebengiuc in March 2011
- Born: Victor George Rebengiuc; 10 February 1933 (age 93); Bucharest, Kingdom of Romania
- Education: Caragiale Academy of Theatrical Arts and Cinematography
- Occupations: Stage actor, film actor, activist
- Years active: 1955–present
- Awards: Order of the Star of Romania, Grand Cross rank

Victor Rebengiuc (Romanian pronunciation: [ˈviktor rebenˈd͡ʒjuk]; known in full as Victor-George Rebengiuc; born 10 February 1933) is a Romanian film and stage actor, also known as a civil society activist.

Since 1957, he has been a member of the Bulandra Theater company, acting in more than 200 roles on that stage alone. Having had his breakthrough performance with Liviu Ciulei's The Forest of the Hanged, Rebengiuc became a major figure in Romanian cinema, and became especially known for his 1986 appearance in Stere Gulea's The Moromete Family. He also starred in films by Dan Pița (Tănase Scatiu; Dreptate în lanțuri; Faleze de nisip; The Man of the Day) and Lucian Pintilie (De ce trag clopotele, Mitică?; Balanța; Too Late; Last Stop Paradise; Niki and Flo; Tertium non datur). Rebengiuc was celebrated for his stage performances, appearing in plays directed by, among others, Ciulei, Radu Penciulescu, Andrei Serban, Cătălina Buzoianu, Yuri Kordonsky, Gábor Tompa, and Alexandru Dabija. The former husband of actress Anca Verești, he is married to Mariana Mihuț, his Bulandra colleague.

Rebengiuc's life under the communist regime provided him an anti-communist perspective, and some of his 1980s films were censored or banned by the country's officials. In 1989, he took part in the Romanian Revolution, when he was among the people who stormed into the Romanian Television building and broadcast the downfall of Nicolae Ceaușescu and an end to communist rule. Rebengiuc subsequently spoke out against political forces he believes stand for the regime's legacy in modern society, and called for the retrospective condemnation of communism. As a public figure, he has had a brief career in politics, and, since the mid-1990s, endorses non-governmental organizations.

== Biography ==
=== Early life ===
A native of Bucharest, Rebengiuc hails from a modest family. After his father was killed in action in the Second World War at Stalingrad in 1942 when he was nine years old, he and his younger brother were raised by their maternal grandparents. He grew up on the city's outskirts, in the low-income quarters, and, as he remembers, his family frequently changed residence in order to afford the rent. They lived in Dristor, then in Chiajna, Rahova, Dealul Spirii, and ultimately northern Bucharest. His father Gheorghe, whom the two sons seldom met, was drafted during World War II, and died fighting in the Army during the Battle of Stalingrad; Victor and his brother were subsequently granted a pension. His mother worked as a clerk, and, just before her retirement, was an employee of the Transport Ministry. Rebengiuc credits his father's genes with his own acting ability. He noted in an interview: "I was pained by my father's absence and, in a way, I always felt like there was something missing, although the bond between us was not strong."

Victor Rebengiuc completed his secondary studies at the Military High School, a school which he is grateful to for having instilled in him a sense of discipline. After a period of collaboration with an amateur troupe located in the Vitan area, Rebengiuc attended the Theater Institute, where he had for his professor actress Aura Buzescu, whom he credits, alongside Clody Bertola, with having inspired his technique. Among the artists who have shaped his work, Rebengiuc also includes the major Soviet actors Mikhail Zharov and Ruben Simonov, whose performances in films he followed closely, and his older Romanian colleague Radu Beligan. He says: "Back when I started I was acting with the amateurs, I was imitating Beligan. [...] Only when I was undergoing examination at the Institute, I was told, 'hey, you're imitating Beligan!' And then I realized it and try to get rid of this thing."

He graduated in 1956, and, after a six-month stint at the National Theater in Craiova, returned to Bucharest, settling in the vicinity of the Cișmigiu Gardens and starting work with Bulandra. Rebengiuc was at the time in a relationship with Anca Verești, whom he married in 1960, divorcing her five years later.

Rebengiuc's first drama role was as Biff in Arthur Miller's play Death of a Salesman, a performance which he regrets, describing its director, Dinu Negreanu, as an untalented person promoted over "political reasons". He also recounts that training for the part brought his first collaboration with Liviu Ciulei, which he sees as one of the few positive aspects of the production. At around the same time, he began a collaboration with the Teatrul Mic company and director Radu Penciulescu, being, together with Leopoldina Bălănuţă, George Constantin and Olga Tudorache, one of the first actors to embark on the project. Rebengiuc appeared in several of Penciulescu's experimental productions: Two for the Seesaw by William Gibson, Tango by Sławomir Mrożek and Richard II by William Shakespeare. Theater critic Simona Chiţan saw the collaboration as an aspect of the liberalization following the socialist realist years: "Penciulescu and Rebengiuc have thus opened [...] a positive period for Romanian theater: the repertoire had been widened, foreign, not just Soviet, plays were being performed, authors modern for the age in question had their plays produced."

=== First major roles ===
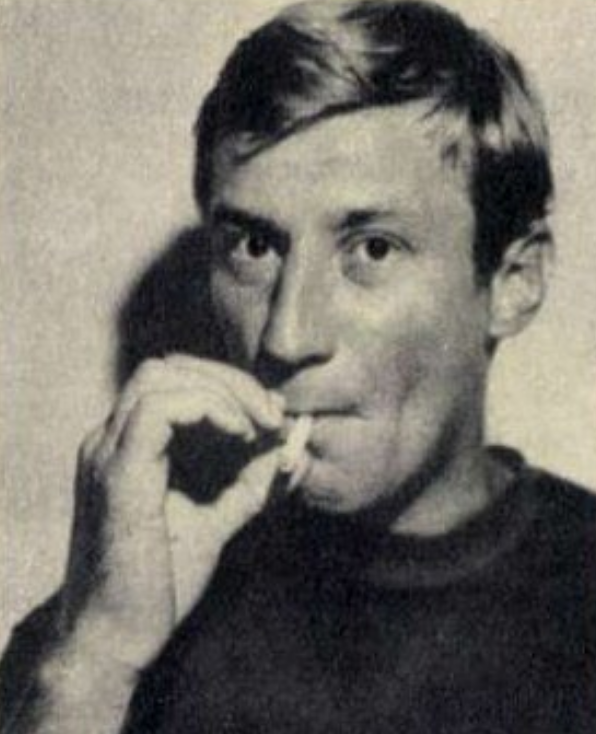
Publicity photograph of Rebengiuc in 1966

Rebengiuc debuted in cinema with the 1956 Mîndrie, and went on to minor roles in several films, including the 1960 Furtuna, adapted by Andrei Blaier from one of Titus Popovici's writings, Iulian Mihu's Poveste sentimentală (from a work by Horia Lovinescu) and Darclée, the biographical story of opera singer Hariclea Darclée. In 1965, Victor Rebengiuc portrayed Apostol Bologa, the central character in Ciulei's film The Forest of the Hanged (adapted from Liviu Rebreanu's novel of the same name). The film earned Ciulei the Best Director Award at the Cannes Film Festival, and was received with a standing ovation at the Acapulco Film Festival in Mexico. Thirty-six years after, Rebengiuc acknowledged that the film was his breakthrough role, and indicated that the film's depiction of ethnic conflicts in Austria-Hungary made it "absolutely fresh, undated", drawing a parallel between its script and the issues posed by the Yugoslav wars. According to his recollections, his "angelic face" had initially been judged unsatisfactory by Ciulei, but he managed to convince during casting. He also says that, upon receiving the news of his acceptance, "my legs began trembling and I fell off my chair".

It was on the set that he met and fell in love with Mariana Mihuț, marrying her in 1965. He fathered a son, Tudor, in 1974, and later recounted that his wife had decided to keep him only because abortion had been outlawed and the clandestine interventions had become unsanitary (see Abortion in Romania, Decreței). Tudor Rebengiuc is a known architect.

Ever since he became known to the public, Rebengiuc established himself as one of the leading actors of his generation, and won praise for both his technique and natural ability. Philosopher and critic Andrei Pleșu writes: "Victor Rebengiuc can act magnificently in any role, for he never acts in the role of 'the artist'. The only 'signal' of his specific involvement is, perhaps, the unmistakable crystal-like nature of his speech, the break-through diction, the natural attention toward the clarity of the vocal emission and the message. And this does not mean the usual affectation of the stage, the pedantic, artificial care for sound effects, for the virile imposture of the voice. It means the respect for the text, for the partner in dialog and for the language. Victor Rebengiuc's talent stems, most of all, from a certain cult for the truth [...] and a most rare ability for what is natural." The actor acknowledges having a fear for improvisation, and recounts having prepared himself intensely for each of his roles. Collaborating with important stage directors such as Ciulei, Cătălina Buzoianu and Andrei Şerban, Rebengiuc won further notability for his performances in adaptations of Shakespearean plays (Orlando in As You Like It, Brutus in Julius Caesar, the title role in Richard II), as well as in those of Henrik Ibsen (Bernick in The Pillars of Society and the main character in Rosmersholm), Anton Chekhov (Michail Lvovich Astroff in Uncle Vanya), Oscar Wilde (Jack in The Importance of Being Earnest), Eugene O'Neill (Long Day's Journey into Night, A Moon for the Misbegotten) and Tennessee Williams (Stanley Kowalski in A Streetcar Named Desire). Before Penciulescu left for Sweden, he and Rebengiuc also worked on the Bulandra version of Rolf Hochhuth's The Deputy (known in Romanian as Vicarul, "The Vicar").

After his debut in cinema, Rebengiuc became a regular presence on screen. His next film was the 1967 Nay-dalgata nosht, by Bulgarian director Vulo Radev, where he starred opposite Nevena Kokanova as the British prisoner. Two years later, under the direction of Mihai Iacob, Rebengiuc starred in The Castle of the Condemned. During the late 1960s and 1970s, he was present in two screen adaption from works by Romania's classical writer Ion Luca Caragiale (Cadou and O scrisoare pierdută). In 1972 and 1973, he starred two adaption of Manole Marcus' adaptations of scripts by Titus Popovici: Conspiraţia and Departe de Tipperary. Also in 1973, he appeared in Gheorghe Vitanidis' Dimitrie Cantemir, and, the following year, had one of the main roles in Constantin Vaeni's Zidul. Rebengiuc also had a role in the 1976 Tănase Scatiu (an adaptation of Duiliu Zamfirescu's Comăneştenilor literary cycle), which was his first collaboration with director Dan Piţa. Two years later, he appeared in Marcus' Cyanide and the Rain Drop, in Vaeni's Buzduganul cu trei peceţi, and in Piţa's The Prophet, the Gold and the Transylvanians. In 1979, he was in The Man in the Overcoat, directed by Nicolae Mărgineanu.

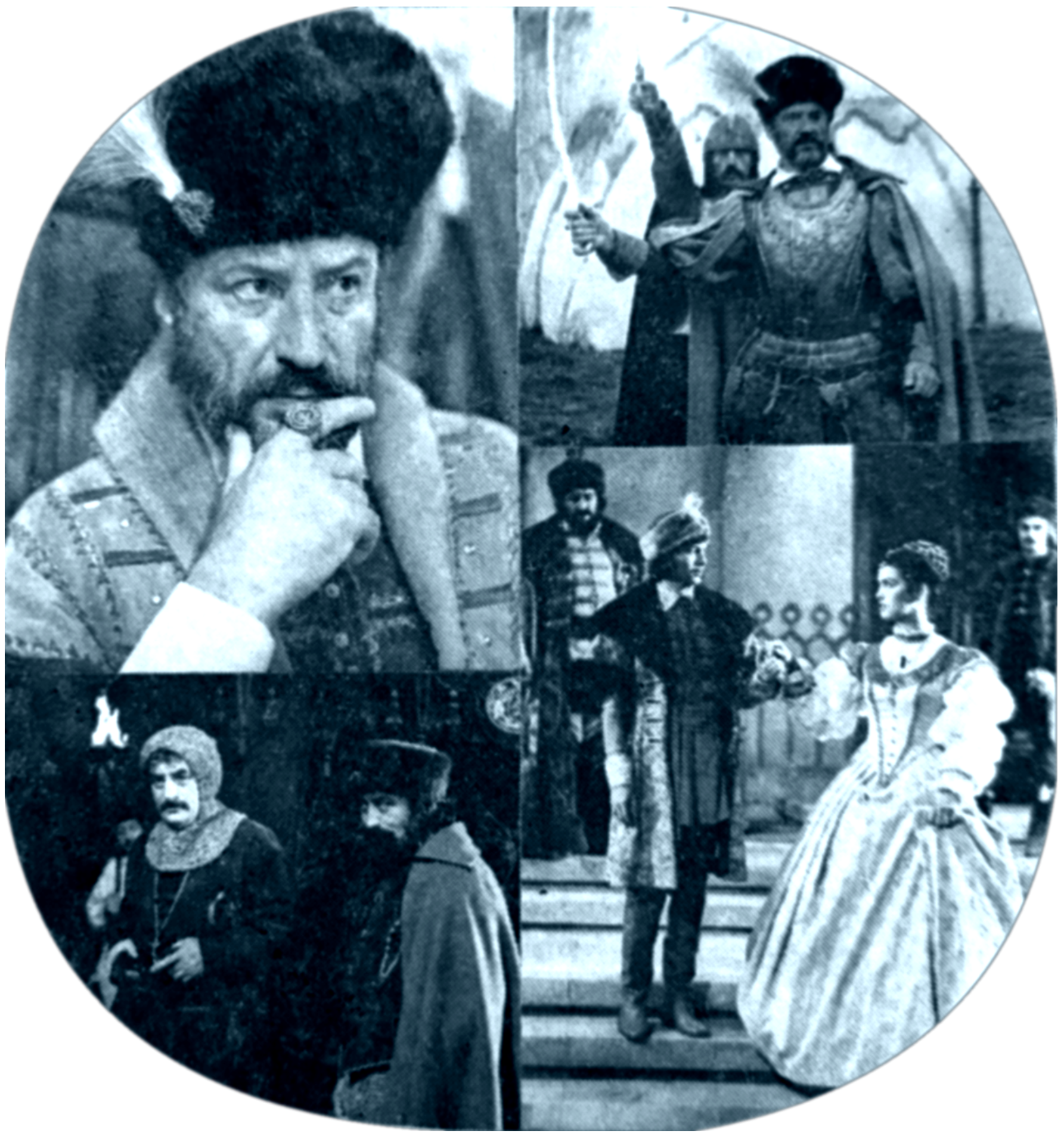
Promo montage for Buzduganul cu trei peceți, with Rebengiuc as Michael the Brave

During the late 1970s, Rebengiuc was also required to appear in a series of film productions that he admits were of little quality and mainly catered to the ideological tenets newly imposed by the communist regime and President Nicolae Ceauşescu (see July Theses). As an example, he cites Buzduganul cu trei peceţi, where he portrayed the main character, late 16th-century conqueror of Transylvania Michael the Brave. Of communist films based on Michael's life, Rebengiuc says: "Michael the Brave was Ceauşescu himself [only] with a beard, mustache and a fur hat, and what came out of his mouth were Ceauşescu's speeches." Rebengiuc also states not having "any regret" for not being invited to star in similar films directed by Sergiu Nicolaescu.

He acknowledges having managed to escape most other forms of endorsement for the communist leader's personality cult, but indicates that, without his permission, several of his performances were considered up for competition in communist-run festivals, and that he was sent a number of diplomas for his various roles. He remembers having refused to take part in Cântarea României festival, a nationwide quasi-compulsory form of socialist competition in the field of arts: "I couldn't and I said no, sir! [They said:] 'Now, if you don't go we'll fire you.' So fire me! Well, they didn't."

=== 1980s and Revolution ===
During the 1980s, he had several roles in Romanian productions, beginning with Lucian Pintilie's 1981 film De ce trag clopotele, Mitică?, where he played Pampon, one of the main roles, while his wife Mihuţ was cast as Pampon's lover Miţa Baston. Pintilie, who planned the production over several years, later recounted that he had meant to cast Toma Caragiu as Pampon, and that he considered asking him just before Caragiu's death in the 1977 earthquake. Regarding the new spin on his character, he noted: "It was a Pampon, one of those who waste nights away, play cards, suffer out of love, is always jealous, is always cheated but does not ever realize it. It was a Pampon with a reduced intellect and tired, who only understands things with difficulty." Although set during the Belle Époque and based on works by Caragiale, the film's bleak atmosphere and irreverent tone alluded to the realities of Communist Romania, which caused it to be censored and ultimately banned before it could premiere. The cooperation between the actor and director cemented their friendship: Rebengiuc calls Pintile "a great director", and states "I love him like a brother."

In 1983, Rebengiuc appeared in Dan Piţa's Dreptate în lanţuri. The same year, he also collaborated with Piţa on Faleze de nisip, based on a screenplay by Bujor Nedelcovici. He starred as the surgeon Theodor Hristea, who, after some of his belongings are stolen, involves himself in the inquiry and directs the interrogation of a seemingly innocent man. The subtle criticism of authorities became a matter of scandal: just days after Faleze de nisip premiered, Nicolae Ceauşescu spoke in front of Romanian Communist Party officials in Mangalia, singling it out from breaking with the ideological requirements; as a result, it was banned from cinemas.

In 1986, Rebengiuc was the central figure in Moromeţii, an adaption of Marin Preda's 1955 book, directed by Stere Gulea. His critically acclaimed performance saw Rebengiuc being identified by the public with his character, the patriarchal and rigid peasant Ilie Moromete. Rebengiuc repeatedly stated having felt unsure about his participation in the film, indicating that he had only impersonated city-dwellers in his previous roles, and that he had limited knowledge of the rural world. He was initially deemed unfit for the part, but managed to convince the director after preparing for it by spending a month in Teleorman County, where he lived among the peasants. The Moromete performance earned Rebengiuc several prizes, including one handed to him during the San Remo Film Festival in Italy, and reportedly won Pintilie's praise. He soon after also cast in Nicolae Mărgineanu's The Forest Woman, alongside Manuela Hărăbor and Adrian Pintea.

In December 1989, Rebengiuc was a participant in the Romanian Revolution, which managed to topple the Ceauşescu regime and end Communist Party's rule. He joined the crowd of revolutionaries heading into the Romanian Television building, and voiced anti-communist messages in front of live cameras. In early 1990, he rallied with the Golaniad protesters in University Square, expressing his opposition to the post-communist ruling party, the National Salvation Front.

=== 1990s and early 2000s ===
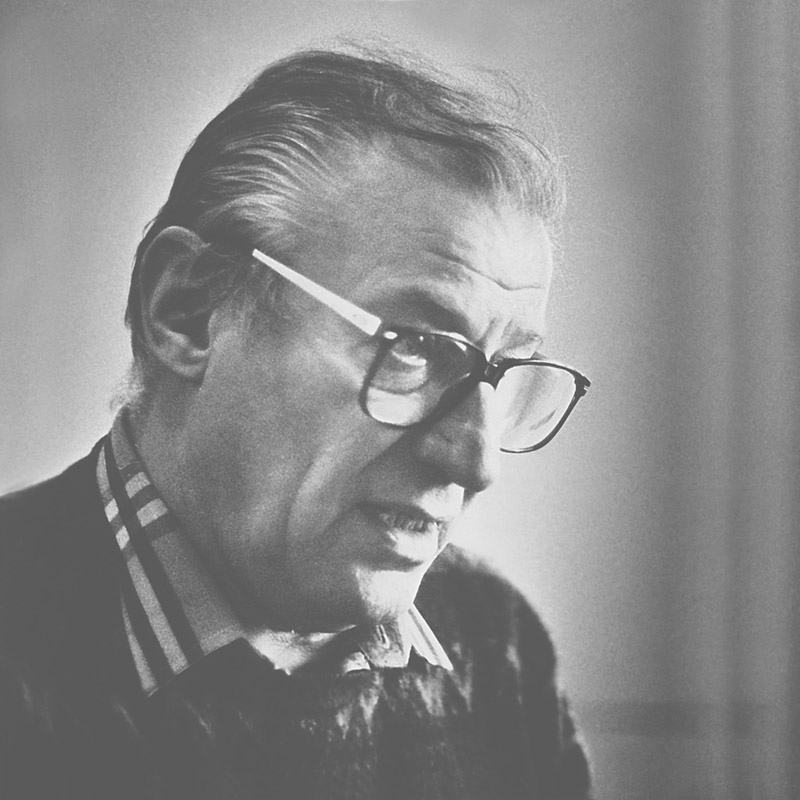
Rebengiuc in 1992

After the end of communism, Rebengiuc continued to act in cinema productions. In 1992, he starred as the Village Mayor in Pintilie's award-winning Balanţa, a role he considered "small, but consistent." His line "Americans are the stupidest people in the world" is remembered as an ironic reflection of nationalism being recovered in communist and anti-capitalist discourse.

The following year, he was in the cast of The Earth's Most Beloved Son, another adaptation from Marin Preda (from the book Cel mai iubit dintre pământeni). The second of Pintilie's films to star Rebengiuc was the Palme d'Or-nominated drama Too Late, which discussed the failings of justice in post-communist Romania, where he played the role of Elephant Foot. In 1997, he was in Piţa's The Man of the Day, which was based on a screenplay by Radu F. Alexandru, and, in 1999, starred alongside Hungarian and Romanian actors in Gábor Tompa's Chinese Defense. Rebengiuc also starred as Grigore Cafanu in Pintilie's 1998 film Last Stop Paradise (awarded the Special Grand Jury Prize at the Venice Film Festival).

He was also sporadically present on the stage with Bulandra, and stated that he was not interested in starring in works of experimental theater, indicating that it did not suit his taste. Between 1990 and 1996, he was head of the Theater Institute. Speaking in 2005, he said that his ultimate goal was to be "a great actor", elaborating that this implied: "acting in a role and not having anything to reproach myself afterwards. Acting without any specks, being without fault, this is what makes me continue." He made a similar statement in 2008, adding: "I do not act beyond reproach. I have good accomplishments, but there are those sections of a part that I do not cover [...]. When there will no longer be such uncovered sections [...] only then will I say: man, I'm a great actor!"

He was Caliban in Bulandra's 1991 production of William Shakespeare's The Tempest, appearing alongside his fellow actor and revolutionary Ion Caramitru. He starred in several main roles in classical plays, and, as Nick Bottom in Ciulei's production of Shakespeare's A Midsummer Night's Dream, received the UNITER prize. He had several main roles in play by acclaimed stage director Silviu Purcărete: Horazio in Carlo Goldoni's The Comical Theater, Pelasgus in Aeschylus' The Suppliants, and the title role in Shakespeare's King Lear. In 2001, Rebengiuc and his wife appeared together in Anton Chekhov's Uncle Vanya, produced for Bulandra by Russian director Yuri Kordonsky. The same year, he was Fetisov in Hristo Boytchev's The Colonel Bird and appeared in Samuel Beckett's Waiting for Godot (directed by, respectively, Alexandru Dabija and Gábor Tompa).

Rebengiuc also appeared in his first major television production, Tandreţea lăcustelor, adapted by Dan Necşulea from a screenplay by Eugene Pretorian, and aired by TVR 1 in 2003. It depicted the lives of people made rich and powerful by the Revolution, who invest their energies in undermining each other's positions. The same year, he again collaborated with Pintilie, starring opposite Răzvan Vasilescu and Niki and Flo, impersonating Colonel Niki Ardelean. His character, whom Rebengiuc himself describes as "a modest man, but one who knows his own value", is exasperated by Flo's continuous intrusion into his life, and eventually turns to murder. He describes this part as the most straightforward of his film characters, and indicates that working with screenwriter Cristi Puiu impressed him. In 2004, he and Puiu collaborated on the short film Cigarettes and Coffee, which received the Golden Bear at the Berlin International Film Festival. Rebengiuc, who portrayed one of three characters (The Father), describes feeling "pleased" by the collaboration, and having to work with "one of the best" texts. This performance also earned him prizes at the Transilvania International Film Festival in Cluj-Napoca and the Anonimul Film Festival in the Danube Delta.

=== Late 2000s ===
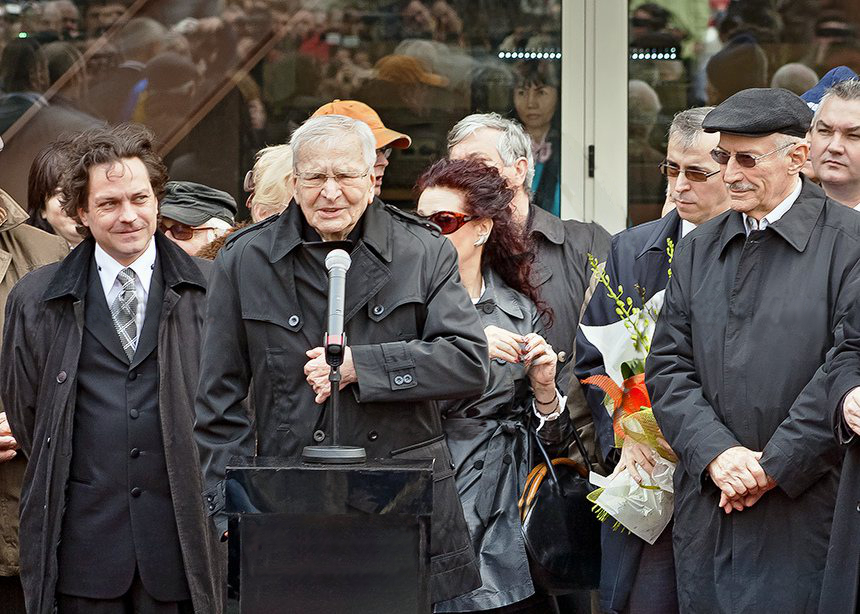
Rebengiuc (first on the right) attending a celebration honoring Radu Beligan, in March 2011

With the Bulandra crew, he was also cast as The Father in Liviu Ciulei's adaptation of Luigi Pirandello's Six Characters in Search of an Author (2005-2006 season). He was praised by critic Valentin Dumitrescu for a "remarkable performance covering the palette of the tragic-grotesque and de-canonized myth of an insurmountable condition". Rebengiuc starred in another of Pintilie's productions, Tertium non datur (based on a story by Vasile Voiculescu), playing The General. He collaborated with Kordonsky on three other stage productions: Nikolai Gogol's Marriage, Ion Luca Caragiale's Conu' Leonida faţă cu reacţiunea (which was shown only once, during a UNESCO festivity in Buşteni) and Mikhail Bulgakov's Heart of a Dog, where he was Preobrazhensky. The latter play was notably showcased at the József Katona Theater in Budapest, Hungary during autumn 2007. Rebengiuc also resumed his work in television productions, appearing in the short series La Urgenţă (aired by TVR 1 in 2006–2007), and in several episodes of Pro TV's Cu un pas înainte. In 2007, entitled to an age pension provided he retires, the actor stated: "I am valid and I still act... When I shall no longer act, I will place myself at a street corner, perchance someone will recognize me and hand me a pretzel or something."

In early 2008, he was Willy Loman in the Bulandra production of Death of a Salesman (directed by Felix Alexa). He appeared again alongside Mihuţ, who played Linda, in what was announced as his comeback to the world of theater. During the same months, Rebengiuc, together with Gheorghe Dinică and Marin Moraru, was awarded the title of Doctor honoris causa by the Theater Institute.

Also in 2007–2008, Rebengiuc was cast in two films: După EA and Silent Wedding, the debut production of his friend and colleague Horaţiu Mălăele. He also released an audiobook version of Leo Tolstoy's The Death of Ivan Ilyich. In February, just before the actor turned 75, journalists Simona Chiţan and Mihaela Michailov published De-a dreptul Victor Rebengiuc ("Victor Rebengiuc for Sure"), a book they dedicated to his acting career, edited by Humanitas. Rebengiuc, who discussed his Christian faith in interviews, also began applying his actor's craft to religious broadcasting, with readings of the Psalms.

His performance as Willy Loman was awarded another UNITER prize in April 2009. The same year, Rebengiuc appeared in Călin Netzer's film Medalia de onoare, and his interpretation as an unwitting war hero was awarded prizes at the Torino Film Festival and the International Thessaloniki Film Festival. The role earned him another Best Male Actor Award at the Transilvania Film Festival, 2010 edition, where he was a guest of honor. In October 2010, he received the Prometheus Opera Omnia Award for Performance Art, granted by the Anonimul Foundation.

He also embarked on a collaboration with the National Theatre Bucharest (TNB), as Joe Keller in Arthur Miller's All My Sons—under Caramitru's direction. Theater critic Silvia Dumitrache, who called the show "lively and dynamic, tense and troubling", highlights the fact that Rebengiuc created a "rather positive" portrayal of a negative role, serving to cast "an even more tragic light over the play." Rebengiuc was also the lead in another TNB production, Legenda Marelui Inchizitor ("The Legend of the Grand Inquisitor"), adapted by Radu Penciulescu from Fyodor Dostoevsky's eponymous parable. Critic Dan Boicea, who noted that the production relied on Rebengiuc's monologues, also argued: "Rebengiuc does not in any way exaggerate, he is passionate through his gentleness, he is firm in the manner through which he spares his energy [...]. He does not erupt at the moment of climax, although he could have well fallen into this sin."

== Politics ==
=== Early causes ===
In a 2005 interview with Dilema Veche, Victor Rebengiuc said: "I have but one certainty: communist society is bad. After the unfortunate experience of several tens of years, I would shove my hand into the furnace over this issue." Despite being confronted with recruitment campaigns before 1989, Rebengiuc never joined the Romanian Communist Party and felt that his role in Heart of a Dog was "representative" of himself, owing to the anti-communist undertones in Mikhail Bulgakov's play.

Rebengiuc first voiced his political message to the public during the Romanian Revolution, when he was present in the Romanian Television building. In an iconic moment, he held up a roll of toilet paper to the camera, urging viewers and members of the television staff who had promoted Ceauşescu's personality cult to clean up after themselves. In 2008, Rebengiuc recalled: "I had been wanting to do this gesture for a long time, and I think it was the most appropriate of moments. I know I took a lot of people by surprise. I told them that people who ate shit and who filled up our lives and ears with Ceauşescu this, Ceauşescu that, ought to disappear. That paper was supposed to wipe out some traces. I am still fighting windmills." Elsewhere, he spoke of his motivations: "All those who just an hour or two before were still eulogizing Ceauşescu were [still] on television. And, just like that, they were on television, making themselves look innocent, pure. [...] Me, until 22 December 1989 [that is, the day Ceauşescu fled], I was wondering: gee, what will all these shit-eaters be doing if the regime is changed? Will they be ashamed? Will they run to hide in dark corners? And then I see them on television..." Rebengiuc, who credits his son Tudor with having urged him to walk into the Television building, also remembers reciting Doina, a nationalist poem by Mihai Eminescu, changing stress from its condemnation of foreigners to read like an attack on people associated with the regime.

On 1 May 1990, at the height of the Golaniad events, Rebengiuc read a Protest of the Romanian Intellectuals, expressing solidarity with the students gathered in University Square in opposition to the National Salvation Front. It was signed by 27 cultural personalities, among them civil society militants (Gabriel Andreescu, Doina Cornea, Radu Filipescu), journalists (Cornel Nistorescu, Octavian Paler), essayists (Gabriela Adameșteanu, Ana Blandiana, Petru Creția, Ștefan Augustin Doinaș, Ion Bogdan Lefter, Romulus Rusan), visual artists (Horia Bernea, Sorin Dumitrescu, Mihai Stănescu), actors (Irina Petrescu, Florin Zamfirescu and Rebengiuc's wife Mariana Mihuţ), musicians (Corneliu Cezar, Teodor Grigoriu, Johnny Răducanu), scientist Edmond Nicolau and filmmaker Lucian Pintilie. The document offered praise to the Timişoara Proclamation, through which both the 1989 revolutionaries and the Golaniad were asking for the application of lustration in Romanian politics, and stressed the continuity between the two forms of street protest, while objecting to the Salvation Front's allegations that the protesters were jeopardizing social consensus: "[The demonstrators] express the Revolution's spirit, the sacrifice of those who have stood for the Romanian people's horror for any form of totalitarianism. The Government's decision to refuse dialogue with the demonstrators, with those who have signed the Proclamation, still divides the population, still alienates one of the most active and responsible sections of the nation. [...] We too wish for stability, but we wish for a moral stability, one based not on personal or party interests, but on the interests of the country and on the sacred aspirations of the December Revolution."

After 1990, Rebengiuc remained a critic of the Salvation Front's successor, the Social Democratic Party. He felt that "The party in power immediately after the Revolution only changed its name and high-ranking leadership, that is all. People were still tied to the communist party's mentality." During the early 1990s, Rebengiuc sympathized with the opposition National Liberals, and, without formalizing his affiliation, ran in elections for the Senate in the 1990 suffrage. Rebengiuc later reflected: "Fortunately, I was not elected." The actor also publicized his monarchism: in April 1992, he was one of the celebrities welcoming Michael I, the deposed King of Romania, during his return visit to the post-communist country. In 2003–2004, Rebengiuc was affiliated with the minor party Union for Romanian Reconstruction (URR). He later stated: "It was a political proposal I believed in. URR could have been a change of the political class." He indicated that his reasons for parting with the group was its failure to gain popularity and reach the number of votes necessary to enter Parliament during the 2004 elections.

=== Civil society activist ===
Since 2002, Rebengiuc has been a member of the non-governmental organization Asociaţia Revoluționarilor fără Privilegii (Association of Non-Privileged Revolutionaries), alongside Ion Caramitru, Dan Pavel, Radu Filipescu, and others. In reference to the goal behind this group, Filipescu stated: "The Association was established as a reaction to the very active organizations of revolutionaries, which were mostly active in demanding material gains. Ultimately, the situation arose where joining an association of revolutionaries had the connotation of pursuing material gains, privileges." He is also a member of the Group for Social Dialog (GDS), a platform for reform-minded intellectuals. As of 2005, he was, with fellow revolutionary Mircea Diaconu, one of the two actors among its 48 members.

He chose to retire from Romanian politics, stating in 2008: "I see no sense in being involved, since I cannot go all the way in opting for any person. I do not believe in any of the people I could elect at this moment, and I therefore prefer to stand aside." Confessing that he cannot bring himself to even read newspapers, he declares himself "disgusted" with the political class. Despite his withdrawal, he signed his name to a set of initiatives which presume a political role. In March 2006, the actor voiced a public appeal signed by 30 non-governmental organizations and over 230 public figures, through which he asked President Traian Băsescu to effect the condemnation of the communist regime in the spirit of the Timișoara Proclamation.

Partly as a result of this appeal, the head of state instituted the Presidential Commission for the Study of the Communist Dictatorship in Romania, which was headed by historian Vladimir Tismăneanu, and a report which the president read in Parliament. During the subsequent controversy, criticism of Băsescu and the report was notably voiced by the opposition groups: the Social Democrats, the Conservative Party and the Greater Romania Party. In February 2007, as parliamentary forces voted in favor of an impeachment referendum against Băsescu, Rebengiuc joined Tismăneanu and 48 other intellectuals in signing an open letter condemning the move. They argued that such a reaction had been made possible by "the concerted attacks of those who felt shaken their business, their impunity, the possibility of perpetuating the post-communist oligarchic state." Warning that, together with the break-up of the Justice and Truth Alliance, this kind of reaction had fermented "a political crisis", they also supported Băsescu's stated goals of stamping out corruption and granting the public opening the archives of the communist secret police, the Securitate. Other signatories of the letter included Gabriel Liiceanu, Sorin Ilieșiu, Mircea Mihăieș, Dan C. Mihăilescu, Mircea Cărtărescu, Magda Cârneci, Horia-Roman Patapievici, Șerban Rădulescu-Zoner, Andrei Oișteanu, Ruxandra Cesereanu, Dan Perjovschi, Alexandru Zub, Virgil Nemoianu, Adriana Babeți, Livius Ciocârlie, Andrei Cornea, Sabina Fati, Florin Gabrea, Andrei Pippidi, Dan Tapalagă, Sever Voinescu, Florin Țurcanu, Hannelore Baier, and Traian Ungureanu.

His call to uncover the secrets of Romania's communist past also made him look up data kept on him by the Securitate and placed at his disposal by the CNSAS, a state agency which manages Securitate archives. He believes that certain information is still missing from his file, indicating that his tendency to speak his mind is likely to have caused the authorities to keep him under surveillance. He also stresses that he long suspected people in his pre-1989 entourage of having informed on him to the Securitate, and recounts having received hate mail soon after the Revolution, especially after having expressed criticism for the Salvation Front.

In January 2007, Rebengiuc and Perjovschi also spoke out on the issue of cultural policies, protesting against the state-run Center for Cinema Production: together with actor Florin Piersic, Jr., filmmaker Radu Afrim, and critics Mihai Chirilov, Alex. Leo Șerban, Marius Chivu, and Daniel Cristea-Enache, they endorsed an online petition which condemned the institution for its decision to grant funding to the projects of controversial director Sergiu Nicolaescu, and for failing to finance young and internationally acclaimed directors such as Cristi Puiu and Thomas Ciulei. Three years later, during the Transilvania International Film Festival, Rebengiuc voiced a public protest of cinema professionals against Nicolaescu's law project, which aimed to modify the criteria in use for the public financing of films. Their protest, codified in the Cluj Proclamation, earned support from visiting German director Wim Wenders.

Rebengiuc was also the spokesman of a 2009 campaign launched by Realitatea TV and titled Noi vrem respect ("We Demand Respect"). The initiative announced as its goal the change of morals and attitudes among the Romanians: "Cheekiness will not turn one into God, money will not make us masters, ignorance does not make us blessed." In a promotional video headlining the campaign, Rebengiuc himself stated that he felt solidarity with the Realitatea vision, being motivated in this by what he saw as a general decrease in standards within Romanian society. His participation in the project was the topic of criticism: commentators argued that the station was using the slogan in the political battle leading up to the 2009 election, and thus reflected its patron Sorin Ovidiu Vântu's option for the anti-Băsescu parties and trade unions. Journalist and academic Bogdan Iancu, who entered a polemic with Realitatea over the issue of covert political support, suggested that there was a contrast between Rebengiuc's stance during the Revolution (the toilet paper episode) and his lending credibility to what "reeks of manipulation intelligently packaged in the suave discourse of social responsibility". In contrast, writer Cezar Paul-Bădescu found the campaign "laudable", describing it the start of a "moral revolution" and believing Rebengiuc's role to have been "as usual, extraordinary", but noting that Realitatea had itself failed at maintaining the journalistic standard it implicitly advertised.

== Selected filmography ==
Year	Title	Role	Notes
1961	Darclee		
1965	Forest of the Hanged		
1978	The Prophet, the Gold and the Transylvanians		
1981	Carnival Scenes		
1983	Sand Cliffs		
1987	The Moromete Family		
1992	The Oak		
1993	The Earth's Most Beloved Son		
1996	Too Late		
1997	The Man of the Day		
1998	Next Stop Paradise		
2003	Niki and Flo		
2007	Cu un pas înainte	Paul Steiner	
2008	Silent Wedding		
2009	Up	Charles F. Muntz	Romanian version
2010	Medal of Honor	Ion	
2010	Tuesday, After Christmas		
2011	The Phantom Father		
2013	The Japanese Dog		
2014	O nouă viață	Nae's father	
2015	Aferim!		
2017	Octav		
2017	Charleston	Ioana's father	
2019	Sacrificiul	Titel Puică	
2021	Pup-o, mă! 2: Mireasa Nebună	The old peasant	
2021	Strada Speranței	The old man	
