= Marcel Iureș =

Romanian film and theater actor

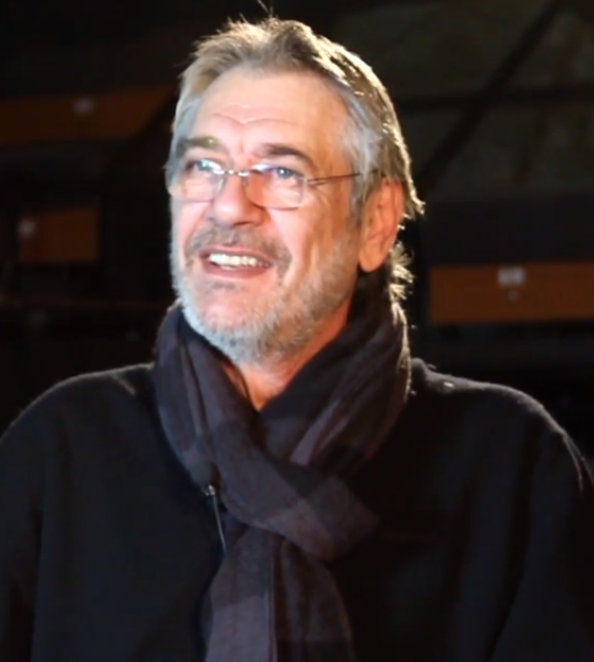
- Marcel Iureș in 2013
- Born: 2 August 1951 (age 75); Băilești, Dolj County, Romanian People's Republic
- Education: Theatrical Arts and Cinematography Institute
- Awards: National Order of Faithful Service

Marcel Iureș (Romanian pronunciation: [marˈtʃel ˈjureʃ]; born 2 August 1951) is a Romanian actor. He is one of Romania's most acclaimed stage and film actors. He has acted in films and on stage both in Romania and internationally, and has played at least ten roles on Romanian and British television. His work includes voiceovers for Disney and computer games. Iureș is the president and a judge of the Anonimul International Film Festival and also the president of Ideo Ideis Festival (an annual national theatre festival for teenagers).

== Early life ==
Iureș was born on 2 August 1951 in Băilești, Dolj County. He entered the Theatrical Arts and Cinematography Institute in Bucharest in 1974 and graduated in 1978.

== Theatrical career ==
He made his stage debut at the Bulandra Theatre, in Bucharest, in the 1975 production of Ferma, playing George. From 1978 to 1981 he acted at the National Theatre, Cluj, in numerous roles such as Beckman in the play Afară în fața ușii and The Coryphaeus in The Persians by Aeschylus During the early 1980s, Iureș appeared at both the Bulandra and Odeon Theatres in Bucharest. Among his roles were the title roles in Shakespeare's were Hamlet, Henry IV, and Richard III, but also Richard II.

He is the president of Teatrul ACT (the first independent theatre in Romania) of which he was one of the founders in 1995. Iureș has starred there in various roles, including the title roles of Shakespeare's Richard II, Richard III (directed by Mihai Măniuțiu), and Hamlet (directed by Liviu Ciulei). He has also appeared in Fundația Teatrul ACT-staged shows such as Creatorul de Teatru (The Creator of the Theatre, directed by Alexandru Dabija), Cetatea Soarelui (Citadel of the Sun, directed by Mihai Măniuţiu), and Samuel Beckett's Krapp's Last Tape. Iureș also continues to perform with the Bulandra Theatre, for whom he played the lead in a 2005 production of Luigi Pirandello's Henry IV.

He received many accolades and nominations (in both Romania and abroad) throughout his career. In 2000, he was awarded by Romanian President Emil Constantinescu the National Order of Faithful Service, Officer class.

== Film roles ==
Iureș made his film debut portraying Franz Liszt in the 1978 Romanian film Vis de ianuarie (January Dream). From the early 1980s and into the 1990s, he continued to build a screen career, appearing in many minor and major roles in Romania.

Iureș's international film career sprang from the UK tour in 1994 of Mihai Măniuțiu's production of Richard III, where he played the eponymous hero. The role of Alexander Golitsyn in the 1996 film Mission: Impossible was quickly followed by playing Dušan Gavrić in the 1997 film The Peacemaker, starring George Clooney and Nicole Kidman. Other film appearances include roles in Hart's War, Pirates of the Caribbean: At World's End, Layer Cake, Goal!, Faimosul Paparazzo, Isolation, Vacanța Cea Mare, and Logodnicii Din America.

== Other work ==
In 2007, Iureș volunteered his help in the Verde 003 project, which aims to build a better environment for all Romanians by planting vegetation.

== Partial filmography ==
- Aurel Vlaicu (1977), as Molla
- The Actress, the Dollars and the Transylvanians (1978), as The sharpshooter
- Vis de ianuarie (1978, January Dream), as Franz Liszt
- Castle in the Carpathians (1981), as the inventor Orfanik
- Punga cu libelule (1981), as Lt. Dimitrie Turda
- Să mori rănit din dragoste de viață (1984, Fatally Injured by Love of Life, a.k.a. To Die from Love of Life), as Mironescu
- Sezonul pescărușilor (1985, Seagull Season)
- Domnișoara Aurica (1986, Ms. Aurica), as the elegant man
- Vacanța cea mare (1988 lit. Vacation by the Sea; a.k.a. The Big Holiday, The Great Vacation), as Neagu
- Un bulgăre de humă (1989, A Ball of Clay)
- Cei care plătesc cu viața (1991, Those Who Pay with Their Lives)
- Balanța (1992, The Oak) a.k.a. Stejarul (known in French as Le Chêne)
- Un été inoubliable (1994, An Unforgettable Summer), as Gen. Ipsilanti
- Interview with the Vampire (1994), as the Paris Vampire
- Somnul insulei (1994, The Sleep of the Island, Director: Mircea Veroiu, adapted from the novel "Al Doilea Mesager"/"The Second Messenger" by Bujor Nedelcovici) .... Jean Elby
- Mission: Impossible (1996) .... Alexander Golitsyn
- The Peacemaker (1997) .... Dusan Gavrich
- Faimosul paparazzo (1999) .... Gari
- Fii cu ochii pe fericire (1999) .... Pitulice
- The Elite (2001) .... Nayo
- I Hope... (2001, Short) .... Will
- Amen. (2002; a.k.a. Eyewitness, and in Germany as Der Stellvertreter) .... Pope
- Hart's War (2002) .... Col. Werner Visser
- Dracula the Impaler (2002) .... Vlad (voice)
- 3 păzește (2003, Three Warnings) .... Sefu'
- Cambridge Spies (2003, TV Mini-Series) .... Otto
- The Tulse Luper Suitcases, Part 2: Vaux to the Sea (2004) .... General Foestling
- Layer Cake (2004) .... Slavo
- A Few Day's Adventures (2004)
- The Cave (2005) .... Dr. Nicolai
- Goal! (2005) .... Erik Dornhelm
- Isolation (2005) .... John
- Cars (2006) .... Doc Hudson (Romanian dubbing)
- Logodnicii din America (2007) .... Radu
- Pirates of the Caribbean: At World's End (2007) .... Capitaine Chevalle
- Youth Without Youth (2007) .... Prof. Giuseppe Tucci
- Gruber's Journey (2008) .... Doctor Gruber
- Thick as Thieves (2009) .... Zykov
- Mănuși Roșii (2010) .... Dr. Ghiosdan
- Bunraku (2010) .... Chief of Police
- The Phantom Father (2011) .... Robert Traum
- Crossing Lines (2013-2014, TV Series) .... Alexander Dimitrov
- O nouă viață (2014) ..... Nae's brother
- Hotel Transylvania 2 (2015) .... Vlad (Romanian dubbing)
- Octav (2017) .... Octave
