= Moromete =

Moromete or Maromete is a surname in Romania, which is almost exclusively confined to areas of Muntenia and Oltenia. It likely originates in the Turkish meremet ("reparation"), which has been taken to mean "botch job", and was used as a derogatory nickname; other theories have it as a derivative of molomete, used in the Oltenian dialect to designate "a lazy person"—ultimately from moale ("soft" or "weak").

== People with the surname ==
- Ilie Moromete and other fictional characters in Marin Preda's Moromeții and Stere Gulea's film adaptation
- Nicolae Moromete (1912–?), Romanian communist prison official and alleged mass murderer
