= Luminița Gheorghiu =

Romanian actress (1949–2021)

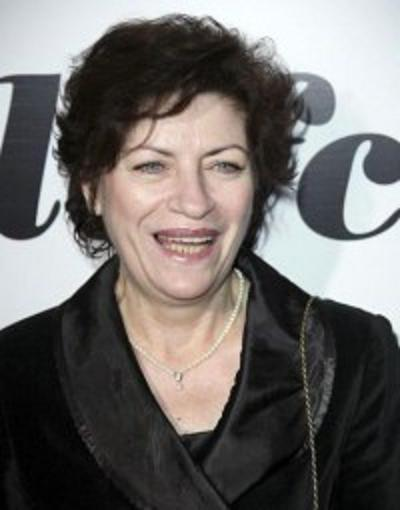
- Gheorghiu in Berlin at Child's Pose party
- Born: Gheorghiu Luminița; 1 September 1949; Bucharest, Romania
- Died: 4 July 2021 (aged 71); Bucharest, Romania
- Occupation: Actress
- Years active: 1971–2021
- Awards: Best Supporting Actress for the movie The Death of Mr. Lazarescu at Los Angeles Film Critics Association; 2006; The Golden Bear at 63rd Berlin International Film Festival for her role in the film Child's Pose; 2013

Luminița Gheorghiu (Romanian pronunciation: [lumiˈnitsa ɡe̯orˈɡi.u]; 1 September 1949 – 4 July 2021) was a Romanian film and stage actress and artistic performer in East Central Europe. She achieved international recognition for her roles in The Death of Mr. Lazarescu (2006) and Child's Pose (2013). Gheorghiu's roles were mostly in Romanian and French, including that in Code Unknown with Juliette Binoche.

Gheorghiu was a 1972 graduate of the Institute of Theatrical and Cinematographic Arts in Bucharest, where she studied under professor Ion Cojar. She made her debut in 1971, at the Casandra Theatre, and then played at theaters in Botoșani and Piatra Neamț. From 1976 to 2003, she played at the Bulandra Theatre in Bucharest.

Gheorghiu died on 4 July 2021 at the age of 71.

== Theatrical roles ==
- Mărioara - Sânziana și Pepelea (Sanziana and Pepelea, a fairy story) by Vasile Alecsandri, directed by Alexandru Tocilescu, 1971, Studioul Casandra (Bucharest)
- Mama Anghelușa -Cânticele comice (Comic Songs) by Vasile Alecsandri, directed by Ion Cojar, Studioul Casandra, 1971
- Trandafira - Trei crai de la răsărit (The Three Magi) by Bogdan Petriceicu Hasdeu, directed by Ion Cojar, Studioul Casandra, 1971
- Victorița - O fată imposibilă (An Impossible Girl) by Virgil Stoenescu, directed by Marietta Sadova, Teatrul "Mihai Eminescu" Botoșani, 1972
- Vivian - Mrs. Warren's Profession by George Bernard Shaw, directed by Marietta Sadova, Teatrul "Mihai Eminescu" Botoșani, 1972
- Mama - The Misunderstanding by Albert Camus, directed by Adrian Lupu, Studioul Casandra, 1972
- Cristina - Ultima cursă (Last Race) by Horia Lovinescu, directed by Emil Mandric, Teatrul "Mihai Eminescu" Botoșani 1974
- Lizzie Curry - The Rainmaker by N. Richard Nash, directed by Emil Mandric, Teatrul "Mihai Eminescu" Botoșani, 1974
- Ciocârlia - Tinerețe fără bătrânețe și viață fără de moarte (Youth Without Age and Life Without Death) by Eduard Covali, directed by Cătălina Buzoianu, Teatrul Tineretului Piatra Neamț, 1975
- Gerda - The Pelican by August Strindberg, directed by Ioan Taub, Teatrul Bulandra, 1976
- Nimi - Miles Gloriosus by Plautus, directed by Anton Taub, Teatrul Bulandra, 1976
- Safta - Răceala (The Cold) by Marin Sorescu, directed by Dan Micu, Teatrul Bulandra, 1977
- Doctorița - Undeva, o lumină (Somewhere, a Light) by Doru Moțoc, directed by Valeriu Moisescu, Teatrul Bulandra, 1977
- Lucietta - The New House by Carlo Goldoni, directed by Valeriu Moisescu, Teatrul Bulandra, 1978
- La lilieci (By the Lilacs) by Marin Sorescu, directed by Virgil Ogășanu, Teatrul Bulandra, 1978
- Șura - A Day of Rest by Valentin Katayev, directed by Valeriu Moisescu, Teatrul Bulandra, 1981
- Dorina - Tartuffe by Molière, directed by Alexandru Tocilescu, Teatrul Bulandra, 1982
- O actriță - A Cabal of Hypocrites by Mihail Bulgakov, directed by Alexandru Tocilescu, Teatrul Bulandra, 1982
- Liniște, ne privim în ochi (Quietly, They Won't See Us) by Marin Sorescu, directed by Virgil Ogășanu, Teatrul Bulandra, 1983
- O lume pe scenă (A World on Stage), directed by Miriam Răducanu, Teatrul Bulandra, 1984
- Ea - The Bench by Alexander Gelman, directed by Mircea Cornișteanu, Teatrul Bulandra, 1984
- Sonia - Uncle Vanya by Anton Chekhov, directed by Alexa Visarion, Teatrul Bulandra, 1985
- Piticul Quaqueo - The Giants of the Mountain by Luigi Pirandello, directed by Cătălina Buzoianu, Teatrul Bulandra, 1987
- Fira - Omul cu mârțoaga (The Man With the Jade) by Gheorghe Ciprian, directed by Petre Popescu, Teatrul Bulandra, 1989
- Madame Bergman - The Awakening of Spring by Frank Wedekind, directed by Liviu Ciulei, Teatrul Bulandra, 1991
- Vittoria - Comic Theater by Carlo Goldoni, directed by Silviu Purcărete, Teatrul Bulandra, 1992
- Whore, Angel - The Seventh Commandment by Dario Fo, directed by Gelu Colceag, Teatrul Bulandra, 1993
- A woman, wife of Ill - The Visit of the Old Lady by Friedrich Dürrenmatt, directed by Felix Alexa, Teatrul Bulandra, 1993
- Paulina - The Winter's Tale by William Shakespeare, directed by Alexandru Darie, Teatrul Bulandra, 1994
- Olga - Three Sisters by Anton Chekhov, directed by Alexandru Darie, Teatrul Bulandra, 1995
- Prezicătoare - Julius Caesar by William Shakespeare, directed by Alexandru Darie, Teatrul Bulandra, 1995
- Nevasta lui Simon - 1794, after Camil Petrescu, Georg Buchner, Peter Weiss; director and scenarist Alexandru Darie, Teatrul Bulandra, 1997
- Exercises in Style, after Raymond Queneau, directed by Ileana Cârstea-Simion, Teatrul Bulandra, 1997
- Bătrâna - Chickenhead by George Spiro, directed by Gelu Colceag, Teatrul Bulandra 1998
- Eugenia - Tango by Slawomir Mrozek, directed by Gelu Colceag, Teatrul Bulandra, 2001
- Portăreasa - De Pretore Vincenzo by Eduardo De Filippo, directed by Horațiu Mălăele, Teatrul Bulandra, 2003

== Feature films ==
- Labirintul (The Labyrinth, 1980), directed by Șerban Creangă
- Secvențe, directed by Alexandru Tatos
- Moromeții (The Moromete Family, 1987), directed by Stere Gulea - Catrina Moromete
- Drumul câinilor (lit. Road of the Dogs, 1991), directed by Laurențiu Damian
- Rămânerea, directed by Laurențiu Damian
- Privește înainte cu mânie (Look Ahead with Anger, 1993), directed by Nicolae Mărgineanu - Lucreția Ciugudean
- Prea târziu (Too Late, 1996), directed by Lucian Pintilie - Mureșan's wife
- Trenul Vieții (Train of Life, 1998) - Rivka
- Code inconnu: Récit incomplet de divers voyages (Code Unknown: Incomplete Tales of Several Journeys, 2000), directed by Michael Haneke
- Marfa și banii (Stuff and Dough, 2001) - Ovidiu's mother
- Moartea Domnului Lazarescu (Death of Mr. Lazarescu, 2005) - Mioara Avram
- 4 luni, 3 săptămâni și 2 zile (2007) - Gina
- Vine poliția! (Here comes the police) (TV Series) (2008) - Lucreția Corbescu
- Nunta mută (Silent Wedding) (2008) - Fira
- Regina (The Queen) (TV Series) (2009) - Elvira
- Iubire și onoare (Love and Honor) (TV Series) (2010) - Dr. Mioara Avram
- Aurora (2010) - Mioara Avram
- Pariu cu viața (TV Series) (2011 - 2013) - Minerva Dumitrescu
- Brave (2012) - The Witch (dubbing)
- Dupa dealuri (Beyond the Hills, 2012), directed by Cristian Mungiu
- Child's Pose (2013) - won the international award Golden Bear at Berlin International Film Festival - Cornelia Keneres
- Aferim! (2015) - Smaranda Cîndescu
- Deschide ochii (Open your eyes) (TV Series) (2016) - Zina Barbu
- Fructul oprit (TV Series) (2018) - Reveca Boască
- Sacrificiul (TV Series) (2019) - Safta
