= The Sleep of the Island =

The Sleep of the Island is a Romanian film from 1994 directed by Mircea Veroiu, inspired from the novel The Second Messenger written by Bujor Nedelcovici.

== Plot ==
The topic of the film points out the condition of an intellectual in time of totalitarian dictatorship, which subjugated an island from where you can not run. The only alternative is collaborating with power and internment in a rehabilitation institute. A famous writer returns to his homeland to try to confront the terror of an oppressive regime, but he ends up being himself corrupted-thanks to the aberrant system.

== Cast ==
- Ovidiu Iuliu Moldovan - Daniel Raynal
- Marcel Iureș - Jean Elby
- Ștefan Sileanu - The island governor
- Elena Albu - Micheline Rolebon
- Dan Condurache - poet Victor Labri
- Mircea Albulescu - Professor Fontaine
- Natașa Raab - Hélène
- Costel Constantin - president of the Ideological College
- Vlad Rădescu - archaeologist Marcel
- Corina Dănilă - Christine
- Rodica Mandache - Veronica, Victor's wife
- Ion Chelaru - Vanghelie

== Production ==
The film was produced by Solaris-Film, in co-production with Star-Film, Cinerom R.A. and the Bucharest's Cinematographic Studio S.A., the film being shot at Buftea. It have been used frames from the films Sezonul Pescarusilor (1985) and Detașamentul Concordia (1980).

== Awards ==
The film obtained Jury's special prize ("Silver Makhila") at the Latin World Festival of Cinematography from Arachon - France 1995.
