= State of Things =

1995 film

- Directed by: Stere Gulea
- Written by: Stere Gulea
- Starring: Oana Pellea
- Release date: 8 December 1995
- Running time: 89 minutes
- Country: Romania
- Language: Romanian

State of Things (Romanian: Stare de fapt) is a 1995 Romanian drama film directed by Stere Gulea. The film was selected as the Romanian entry for the Best Foreign Language Film at the 69th Academy Awards, but was not accepted as a nominee.

== Cast ==
- Oana Pellea as Alberta Costineanu
- Mircea Rusu as Andrei Secoșan
- Dan Condurache as Petrache Maxențiu
- Răzvan Vasilescu as Officer Mureșan
- Șerban Celea as Officer Crețu
- Luminița Gheorghiu as Mureșan's wife
- Mara Grigore as Nurse from TV station
- Cornel Scripcaru as Major Leo
- Silviu Stănculescu as Maxențiu's father

== See also ==
- List of submissions to the 69th Academy Awards for Best Foreign Language Film
- List of Romanian submissions for the Academy Award for Best Foreign Language Film
