= Mircea Anca =

- Born: Florin Mircea Anca; 10 June 1960; Fărcașa, Baia Mare Region, People's Republic of Romania
- Died: 28 November 2015 (aged 55); Bucharest, Romania
- Education: Institute of Theatrical and Cinematographic Art
- Occupations: Actor and director
- Years active: 1987–2006

Mircea Anca (Romanian pronunciation: [ˈmirtʃe̯a ˈaŋka]; 10 June 1960 – 28 November 2015) was a Romanian film actor and director.

== Education and Career ==
He graduated from the I.L. Caragiale Institute of Theatre and Film Arts in 1989 with specialty acting, and in 2003 with specialty theater directing. Anca was an actor at the National Theatre Bucharest and a professor at the Faculty of Arts of Hyperion University of Bucharest.

== Filmography ==
- Moromeții (1987)
- Maria și marea – Captain Alber (1988)
- Kilometrul 36 (1989)
- Hotel de lux (1992)
- Numai iubirea (2004) – Dr. Cojocaru
- Băieți buni (2005) – Francezu
- Iubire ca în filme (2006) – Mr. Sturza
