= Florin Călinescu =

Romanian politician, actor, theatre director and television host

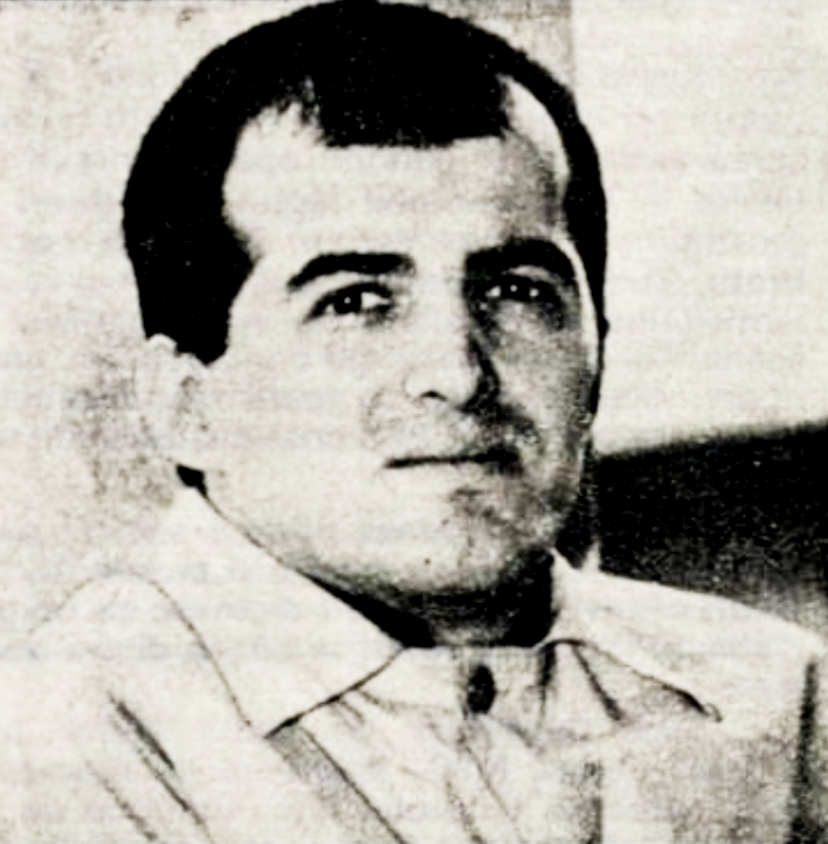
Călinescu in March 1984

Florin Călinescu (Romanian pronunciation: [floˈrin kəliˈnesku]; born 29 April 1956) is a Romanian politician, former leader of the Green Party of Romania (PV), actor, theatre director, and television host.

Born in Timișoara, he graduated the Constantin Diaconovici Loga High School in 1975, after which he studied at the I.L. Caragiale Institute of Theatre and Film Arts (IATC). From 1996 to 2000, he hosted the popular late-night TV talk show Chestiunea Zilei (Today's Issue). He also starred in Filantropica and is known for his role in the all-time blockbuster Neighbourhood Story (Poveste de cartier), as Davinci Stănescu.

He was chosen to dub a character in the animated series Iron Man in 2000; the series premiered on Fox Kids channel.

== Selected filmography ==
- Ștefan Luchian (1981)
- Enigmele se explică în zori (1989)
- Balanța The Oak (1992)
- E pericoloso sporgersi (1993)
- O vară de neuitat Un été inoubliable (1994)
- Prea târziu Too Late (1996)
- Asphalt Tango, French-Romanian film (1996)
- Anticamera, TV series (2008)
- Poveste de cartier, film (2008)
- Tanti Florica, TV series (2012)

== Electoral history ==
=== Mayor of Bucharest ===
Election	Affiliation	First round		
Election	Affiliation	Votes	Percentage	Position
2020	Green Party	13,742	2.08%	4th
