= Rotărești =

Rotăreşti may refer to:

- Rotăreşti, a village in Sâmbăta Commune, Bihor County, Romania
- Rotăreşti, a village in Talpa Commune, Teleorman County, Romania
