= Liviu's Dream =

2004 film

Liviu's Dream Visul lui Liviu
- Directed by: Corneliu Porumboiu
- Written by: Corneliu Porumboiu
- Produced by: Mihai Orasanu
- Starring: Dragoş Bucur; Gheorghe Visu
- Edited by: Roxana Szel
- Release date: 5 June 2004 (TIFF)
- Running time: 39 minutes
- Country: Romania
- Language: Romanian

Liviu's Dream (Romanian: Visul lui Liviu) is a 2004 Romanian film directed by Corneliu Porumboiu.

== Awards ==
In 2004, the film won best short at the Transilvania International Film Festival.

== See also ==
- Romanian New Wave
