= Bogdan Ulmu =

Romanian theater director, writer and opinion journalist (1951–2016)

- Born: Bogdan Ștefan Ghiță; April 29, 1951; Bucharest, Romanian People's Republic
- Died: May 20, 2016 (aged 65); Iași, Romania
- Resting place: Eternitatea Cemetery, Iași
- Education: Caragiale National University of Theatre and Film
- Occupations: Theatre director; acting teacher; writer; publicist
- Spouse: Nina Dimitriu Ulmu
- Website: bogdanulmu.eu

Bogdan Ștefan Ghiță Ulmu (April 29, 1951 – May 20, 2016), known as Bogdan Ulmu, was a Romanian theatre director, writer, and opinion journalist.

== Biography ==
Bogdan Ulmu was born in 1951 in Bucharest, the son of the accountant Vasile Ghiță and the clerk Maria Ghiță (née Cataramă). After graduating from high school, Ulmu enrolled in the Institute of Theatre and Film Arts, Bucharest (IATC), which he graduated in 1978. In the beginning he worked as an acting teacher at the Folk Art School in Ploiești, to make a theater directorate in Bucharest and other cities. In 1990 he became a member of the Writers' Union of Romania and in 1995 of UNITER. Lecturer and professor at universities in Bucharest, Timișoara, Iași, and Bacău, Ulmu earned his doctorate in theatrology with the thesis "Caragiale, ludicul" in 1998.
