= Gheorghe Visu =

Romanian actor

Gheorghe Visu Order of the Culture Merit of Romania
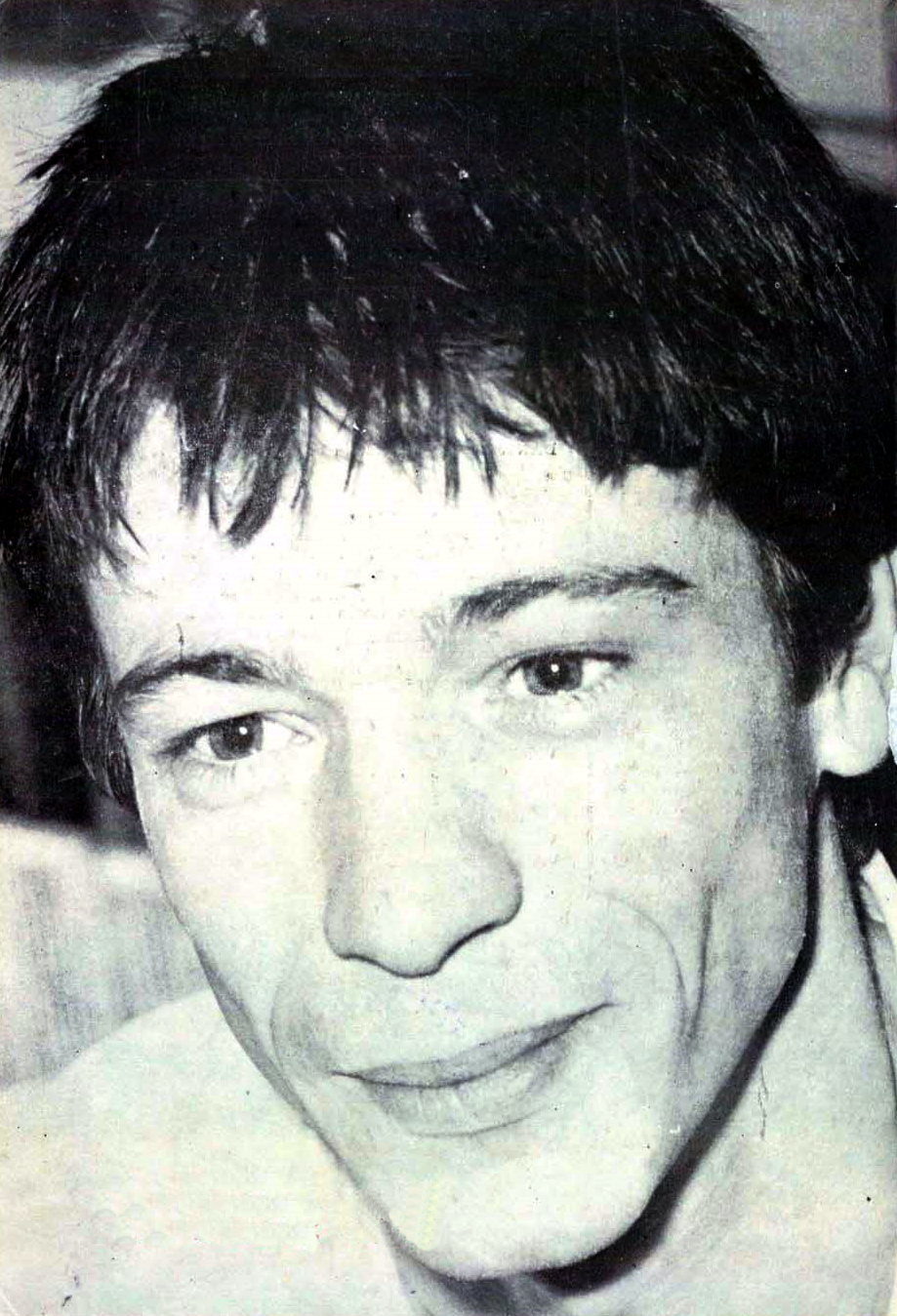
- Gheorghe Visu in 1985.
- Born: 2 July 1951 (age 74); Bucharest, Romania
- Occupation: Actor
- Years active: 1974-present

Gheorghe Visu (Romanian pronunciation: [ˈɡe̯orɡe ˈvisu]; born 2 July 1951) is a Romanian actor. He appeared in more than forty films since 1974.

In 2006 and 2007 the actor was chosen by Walt Disney Pictures to provide the Romanian voice of Bagheera in the animated movies The Jungle Book and The Jungle Book 2.

== Selected filmography ==
Year	Title	Role	Notes
1975	Tată de duminică		
1978	The Prophet, the Gold and the Transylvanians		
1979	Mihail, câine de circ		
1983	Sand Cliffs	Pustiul	
1989	Those Who Pay With Their Lives		
1992	The Oak		
1995	The Outpost		
1998	Next Stop Paradise		
1999	The Famous Paparazzo		
2003	Exam	Stanciu	
2004	Liviu's Dream		
2016	Dogs	Hogas	
