= Mihai Gruia Sandu =

Romanian actor, playwright and director (born 1956)

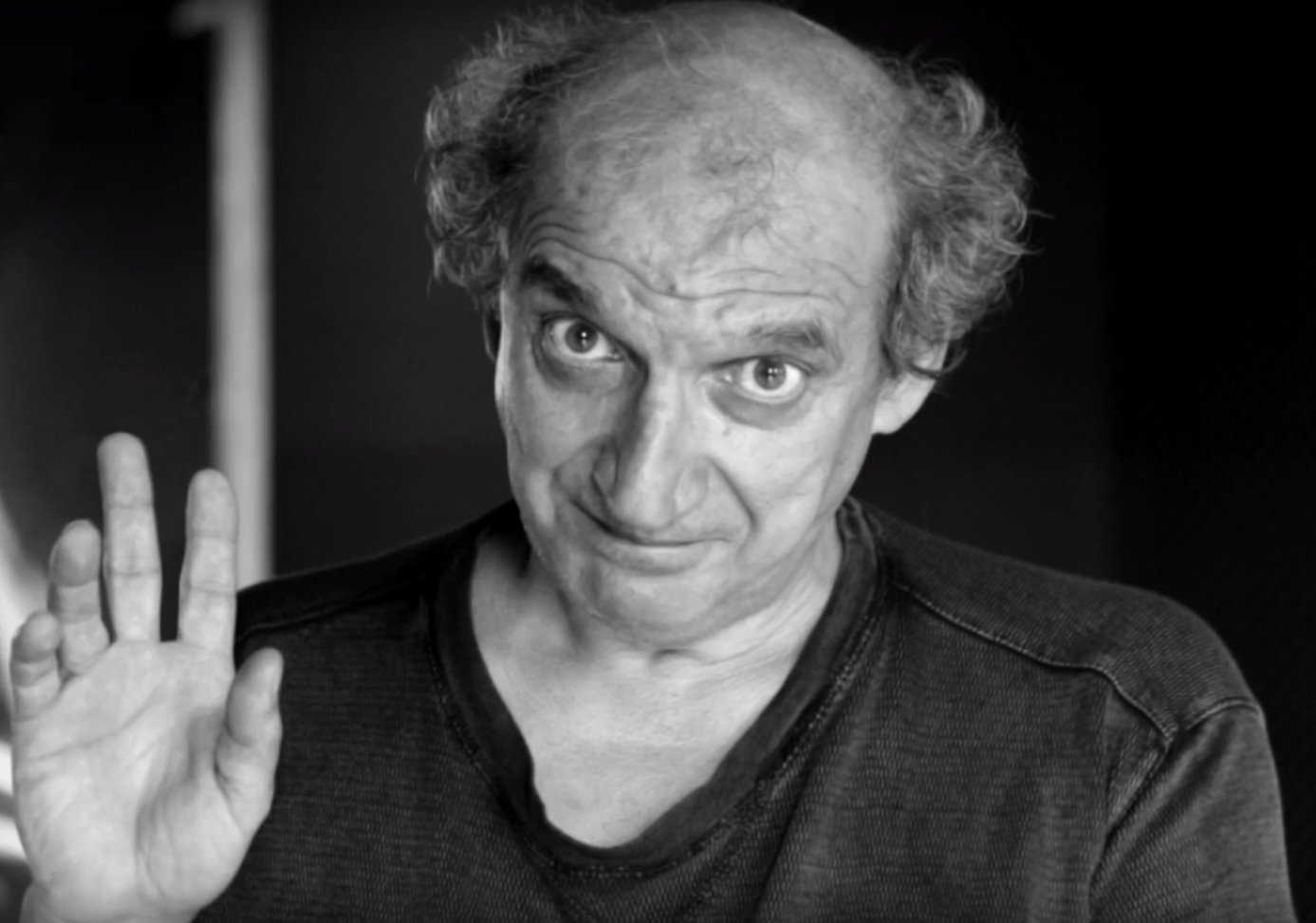
- Born: 12 October 1956 (age 68)
- Occupations: Actor; playwright; director
- Years active: 1991–present

Mihai Gruia Sandu (born 1956) is a Romanian actor, playwright and director.

== Filmography ==
- Sherlock: Case of Evil
- The Rest Is Silence (2007 film)
- Too Late (1996 film)
- Teen Knight
- Gruber's Journey
- Incubus
- Blood & Chocolate (film)
- Rio - Nigel (Romanian version) / 20th Century Fox
