= The Moromete Family =

- Directed by: Stere Gulea
- Starring: Victor Rebengiuc; Luminița Gheorghiu
- Release date: 28 September 1987
- Running time: 2h 22min
- Country: Romania
- Language: Romanian

The Moromete Family (Romanian: Moromeții) is a 1987 Romanian drama film based on the first volume of the eponymous novel by Marin Preda. A sequel The Moromete Family 2 was filmed in 2017.

The movie, as well as its sequel, were shot in Talpa, Teleorman County.

== Cast ==
- Victor Rebengiuc – Ilie Moromete
- Luminița Gheorghiu – Catrina Moromete
- Gina Patrichi – Guica
- Dorel Vișan – Tudor Bălosu
- Mitică Popescu – Cocoșilă
- Petre Gheorghiu – Aristide
- Florin Zamfirescu – Țugurlan
- Emilia Popescu – Ilinca
- Constantin Chiriac – Nilă
- Cristina Tacoi – Aristița
- Teodora Mareș – Polina
- Ilie Gheorghe – Dumitru
- Constantin Cojocaru – Ion
- Vladimir Juravle – Iocan
- Ion Anghel – police chief
- Nicolae Praida – Constantin
- Raluca Zamfirescu
- Mihai Gruia Sandu – Bâldii
- Mircea Florin Anca
- Jorj Voicu – Voicu
- Ovidiu Schumacher – Teodorescu
