= The Phantom Father =

2011 Romanian film

- Film poster
- Romanian: Tatăl fantomă
- Directed by: Lucian Georgescu
- Written by: Lucian Georgescu; Barry Gifford
- Starring: Marcel Iureș; Barry Gifford
- Music by: Johannes Malfatti
- Release date: August 2011 (Montreal World)
- Running time: 90 minutes
- Country: Romania
- Language: Romanian

The Phantom Father (Romanian: Tatăl fantomă) is a 2011 Romanian film directed by Lucian Georgescu. The film premiered at the 2011 Montreal World Film Festival.

== Cast ==
- Marcel Iureș as Robert Traum
- Mihaela Sîrbu as Tanya
- Valer Dellakeza as Sami
- Mihai Constantin as Mayor Codrescu
- Mimi Brănescu as Alex
- Victor Rebengiuc as Uncle Petre
- Barry Gifford as Jack
