= Bujor Nedelcovici =

Romanian-French writer

Bujor Nedelcovici (Romanian pronunciation: [buˈʒor neˈdelkovit͡ʃʲ]; March 16, 1936 – November 18, 2023) was a Romanian-French novelist, essayist, playwright, screenwriter, journalist and photographer.

Bujor Nedelcovici finished high school at "I. L. Caragiale" in Ploiești, Romania. He graduated from the Bucharest law faculty in 1959. For a short period, he worked as a lawyer at the Ploiești Lawyers' Bar Association. He was fired for political reasons and forbidden to practice law (His father was arrested by the Communist regime and imprisoned). For the next 12 years, he had to earn his living by taking jobs inappropriate to his background, moving from one construction site or factory to another, all across Romania, from Bicaz to Braşov and Bucharest.

== Literary career ==
((Ro) – Romanian citation, (Fr) – French citation)

Bujor Nedelcovici started his literary career with the novel The Last Ones / Ultimii (Ro) – published in 1970 in Bucharest. An abundant writing activity followed. Nedelcovici published in various Romanian magazines, newspapers, and continued to write novels: Without Oars / Fara Vâsle (Ro) – 1972, The Night / Noaptea (Ro) – 1974, Icoanei Garden / Gradina Icoanei (Ro) – 1977, Days of Sand / Zile de Nisip (Ro) – 1979, The Sleep of the Customs Officer / Somnul Vamesului (Ro) – 1981. The above novels were awarded several prizes by the Writers’ Union and the Writers’ Association of Romania. In 1981 the novel Days of Sand / Zile de Nisip (Ro) was made into a movie under the title Sand Cliffs / Faleze de Nisip (Ro). The novel only seems to be a simple story. A doctor from Bucharest is spending the summer holiday at a remote village near the Black Sea, and one day has his personal belongings stolen from the beach. He gets involved into the inquiry and runs the interrogation of an apparently innocent man. Nedelcovici, a master of the plot, makes us notice the relation between the crashing power of the authority and the common citizen who finally becomes its victim. The young man, a carpenter, tries by all means to prove his innocence and rebel against the unjust accusation that is laid against him, but is defeated by the system. In the end he murders the doctor who symbolically turns to represent the authority. The subtle criticism of the authorities became a matter of scandal: four days after Sand Clifs / Faleze de Nisip (Ro) was screened, in 1981, it was banned from the market. But this was apparently not enough. In 1983 Nicolae Ceauşescu, President of Romania at that time, gave a speech for Romanian Communist Party officials in Mangalia, harshly criticizing the movie and singling it out that Sand Cliffs was breaking with the ideological requirements.

In 1982 Bujor Nedelcovici becomes the Editor-in-Chief of the Romanian literary magazine "Almanahul Literar", and leads the Fiction Section of the Bucharest Writers’ Association.

In 1983 Nedelcovici writes a novel entitled The Second Messenger / Al Doilea Mesager (Ro) – about a totalitarian fictional world – "Beautiful Island" / "Belle-Isle (Fr)" – which is to become "The Island of Victory" after the invasion of its capital city. Despite the fact that the author does not directly describe the communist regime in his country, he refers to a country in successive transformation, which evolves into a totalitarian world. In Romania, the Communist Censorship Office forbade the publishing of the novel. While still in Romania, Bujor Nedelcovici succeeded to get the manuscript out of the country, and fortunately The Second Messenger / Le Second Messager (Fr) was published in 1985 in France by the well-known editor Albin Michel. This led to quite a shock in Romania, and Bujor Nedelcovici was forced to ultimately choose the road of exile. In 1987 Nedelcovici leaves Romania and asks for political exile in France.

== Life in exile: Paris, France ==
In 1987 Bujor Nedelcovici defected to France. He has been living in Paris since then. Well established French publishers printed his novels: The Morning of a Miracle / Le Matin d'un Miracle (Fr) – Actes Sud, 1993, and The Provoker / Le Provocateur (Fr) – Euro-Culture, 2000. He was invited to give a series of lectures in the United States and Canada. He published various essays among which The Encounter with the 21st century in the French Canadian magazine La Revue Cite Libre. He is on the Board of Editors for the French literary magazine Esprit, where he constantly publishes articles and essays.

== Activities after 1989 ==
Following the fall of Romania's President Nicolae Ceausescu in 1989, Bujor Nedelcovici visited Romania numerous times, being invited to publish and lecture. He gave interviews for the Romanian National Radio and is a familiar figure on the Romanian TV channels. He publishes articles in various Romanian magazines and newspapers as well as novels at the Romanian publishing houses.

In 1992 Bujor Nedelcovici was awarded the Prize of the American Romanian Academy of Arts and Sciences for his novel The Second Messenger / Le Second Messager (Fr). In 1990 he was honored by being made Chevalier de l'Ordre des Arts et Lettres (Knight of the Order of Arts and Letters) and was accepted as a member of SACD (Société des Auteurs et Compositeurs Dramatiques (Fr) / Society of Dramatic Authors and Composers), as well as a member of SGDLF (Société des Gens de Lettres de France (Fr) / Society of Men of Letters of France).

Recently the complete works of Bujor Nedelcovici have been published in seven volumes in Romania by Allfa All Publishing House. In November 2008 Nedelcovici organized and chaired the Symposium The Writer, Censorship, and the State Security: Securitatea / Scrritorul, Cenzura si Securitatea (Ro), at Gaudeamus International Book and Education Fair, Bucharest, Romania. Nedelcovici invited to this Panel Discussion several well-known Romanian writers as well as the French scholar and historian Stéphane Courtois, author of The Black Book of Communism: Crimes, Terror, Repression. The panel discussions of this seminar will soon come into a book in Romania.

Nedelcovici died on November 18, 2023, at the age of 87.

== Works published in France ==
- The Provoker, novel /Le Provocateur (Fr), roman / Provocatorul (Ro), roman, Euro Culture Publisher, Paris, France 2000.
- The Tamer of Wolves, novel / Le Dompteur de Loups (Fr), roman / Îmblânzitorul de Lupi (Ro), roman, Actes Sud Publisher, Paris, France, 1999
- The Morning of a Miracle, novel / Le Matin d'un Miracle (Fr), roman / Dimineaţa unui miracol (Ro), roman, Actes Sud Publisher, Paris, France, 1993.
- Days of Sand, novel / Crime de Sable (Fr), roman / Zile de Nisip (Ro), roman, Albin Michel Publisher, Paris, France, 1989.
- The Second Messenger, novel / Le Second Messager (Fr), roman / Al Doilea Mesager (Ro), roman, Albin Michel Publisher, 1985.

== Works published in Romania ==
- Complete Literary Works, 7 volumes / Opere Complete (Ro) in 7 volume, Allfa All, 2005–2008
- Architecture Vandalism in Bucharest, 1984–1989, photo album / Vandalism Architectonic in Bucuresti, 1984–1989 (Ro), album foto, Editura pentru Exilul Romanesc, 2007
- A Paper Tiger: I, Nica and the State Security – Securitate, essay / Un Tigru de Hartie: Eu, Nica si Securitatea (Ro), eseu, Editura Allfa All, 2005.
- 2 + 1, plays / 2 + 1, teatru, 1999
- The Grass of the Gods, short-stories / Iarba zeilor (Ro), povestiri, 1998
- Unfaithful Diary. Exist from Exile: 1992–1997, exile diary / Jurnal infidel. Ieşirea din exil 1992–1997 (Ro), jurnal de exil, Editura Paralela 45, 1998
- The Provoker, novel / Provocatorul (Ro), roman, 1997
- Here and Now, journalism / Aici şi acum (Ro), articole, 1996
- The Night of the Solstice, play / Noaptea de solstiţiu (Ro), piesă de teatru, 1992
- Oratorio for Imprudence, short stories / Oratoriu pentru imprudenţă (Ro), povestiri, 1992
- The Tamer of Wolves, novel / Îmblânzitorul de lupi (Ro), roman, 1991
- The Sleep of the Customs Officer, novel /Somnul Vameşului (Ro), roman, 1981
- Days of Sand, novel / Zile de nisip (Ro), roman, 1979
- Icoanei Garden, novel / Grădina Icoanei (Ro), roman, 1977
- The Night, novel, / Noaptea (Ro), roman, 1974
- Without Oars, novel / Fără vâsle (Ro), roman, 1972
- The Last Ones, novel, the first edition published in 1970, and a second edition in 2000 / Ultimii (Ro), roman, 1970

== Movies adapted from novels by Bujor Nedelcovici ==
- Faleze de nisip (Ro) / Sand Cliffs after the novel Days of Sand / Zile de Nisip (Ro), directed by Dan Pita, co-screenwriters: Bujor Nedelcovici and Dan Pita, main character starring the Romanian well-known Romanian actor Victor Rebengiuc, released in Bucharest, Romania, 1983.
- Somnul Insulei (Ro) / The Sleep of the Island, after the novel The Second Messenger / Le Second Messager (Fr) / Al Doilea Mesager (Ro) – a well-known cast, starring Ovidiu Iuliu Moldovan, directed by Mircea Veroiu, Bucharest, Romania, 1994.

== Awards ==
- The Prize of the Romanian Writers' Union for the novel The Morning of a Miracle / Dimineaţa unui miracol (Ro), Bucharest, Romania, 1993
- The Prize of the American Romanian Academy of Arts and Sciences for the novel The Second Messenger / Le Second Messager (Fr), Los Angeles, California, 1992.
- Chevalier de l'Ordre des Arts et Lettres (Knight of the Order of Arts and Letters), Paris, France, 1990.
- Prix de la Liberte / Freedom Prize of the French PEN-Club, for the novel The Second Messenger, Paris, France, 1986.
- The Prize of the Romanian Writers' Union for the novel Days of Sand / Zile de Nisip (Ro), Bucharest, Romania, 1979.
- The Prize of the Bucharest Writers’ Association for the novel The Night / Noaptea (Ro), Bucharest, Romania, 1974.
