= Radu F. Alexandru =

Romanian politician and screenwriter (1943–2025)

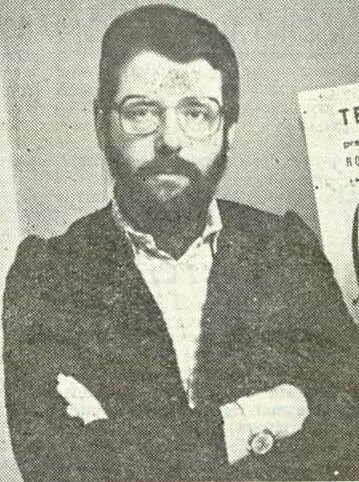
- Alexandru in 1980

Member of the Senate of Romania
- In office 1996–2004
- In office 2008–2012

Personal details
- Born: Radu Feldman Alexandru; 12 July 1943 Bucharest, Romania
- Died: 26 December 2025 (aged 82) Bucharest, Romania
- Party: PDL; PNL

Radu Feldman Alexandru (12 July 1943 – 26 December 2025) was a Romanian politician and screenwriter. A member of the Democratic Liberal Party and the National Liberal Party, he served in the Senate of Romania from 1996 to 2004 and again from 2008 to 2012.

Alexandru was a frequent collaborator of director Dan Pița, writing his films The Man of the Day (1997), starring Ștefan Iordache, and Second Hand (2005), starring Mihai Călin and Alexandra Dinu.

Alexandru died in Bucharest on 26 December 2025, at the age of 82.

== Selected filmography ==
- The Man of the Day (1997)
- Second Hand (2005)
