= Niki and Flo =

2003 film by Lucian Pintilie

- Directed by: Lucian Pintilie
- Starring: Victor Rebengiuc; Răzvan Vasilescu
- Release date: 18 May 2003 (CFF)
- Running time: 1h 39min
- Country: Romania
- Language: Romanian

Niki and Flo (Romanian: Niki Ardelean, colonel în rezerva) is a 2003 Romanian drama film directed by Lucian Pintilie.

== Cast ==
- Victor Rebengiuc - Niki Ardelean
- Răzvan Vasilescu - Florian (Flo) Tufaru
- Coca Bloos - Poucha Ardelean
- Mihaela Caracas - Doina Tufaru
- Șerban Pavlu - Eugen Tufaru
- Dorina Chiriac - Angela Tufaru
- Marius Galea - Mihai Ardelean
- Andreea Bibiri - Irina Ardelean
- Constantin Ghenescu - Irina's father
- Aristita Diamandi - Irina's mother
- Alexandru Bindea - Irina's brother
- Raluca Penu - Irina's sister
- Ion Chelaru
- Ruxandra Sireteanu
