= An Unforgettable Summer =

- French theatrical release poster
- French: Un été inoubliable
- Directed by: Lucian Pintilie
- Screenplay by: Lucian Pintilie
- Based on: Cronică de familie by Petru Dumitriu
- Produced by: Lucian Pintilie; Marin Karmitz; Constantin Popescu; Paul Bortnovschi
- Starring: Kristin Scott Thomas; Claudiu Bleonţ; Olga Tudorache; George Constantin
- Cinematography: Călin Ghibu
- Edited by: Victoriţa Nae
- Music by: Anton Şuteu
- Distributed by: MK2 Productions
- Release dates: 15 May 1994 (Cannes); 15 June 1994 (France)
- Running time: 81 minutes
- Countries: Romania; France
- Languages: Romanian (main); French (additional dialogue); English (additional dialogue)
- Box office: $65,352

An Unforgettable Summer (French: Un été inoubliable; Romanian: O vară de neuitat) is a 1994 drama film directed and produced by Lucian Pintilie. A Romanian-French co-production based on a chapter from a novel by Petru Dumitriu, it stars Kristin Scott Thomas as Hungarian-born aristocrat Marie-Thérèse Von Debretsy. Her marriage with Romanian Land Forces captain Petre Dumitriu brings her to Southern Dobruja (present-day northeastern Bulgaria), where they settle in 1925. There, she witnesses first-hand the violent clashes between, on one hand, the Greater Romanian administration, and, on the other, komitadji brigands of Macedonian origin and ethnic Bulgarian locals. The film shows her failed attempt to rescue Bulgarians held hostage by the Romanian soldiers, and who are destined for execution. An Unforgettable Summer also stars Claudiu Bleonț as Captain Dumitriu and Marcel Iureș as Ipsilanti, a general whose unsuccessful attempt to seduce Von Debretsy and the resulting grudge he holds against the couple account for Dumitriu's reassignment.

Completed in the context of the Yugoslav wars, the film constitutes an investigation into the consequences of xenophobia and state-sanctioned repression, as well as an indictment of a failure in reaching out. It is thus often described as a verdict on the history of Romania, as well as on problems facing the Balkans at large, and occasionally described as a warning that violence could also erupt in a purely Romanian context.

Released by MK2 Productions, An Unforgettable Summer was financed by the Council of Europe's Eurimages fund for continental cinema. In the United States and elsewhere, it was made available on limited release. Other actors credited in secondary roles include George Constantin as General Tchilibia, Răzvan Vasilescu as Colonel Turtureanu, Olga Tudorache as Madame Vorvoreanu, Cornel Scripcaru, Carmen Ungureanu, Dorina Lazăr, Mihai Constantin and Ioan Gyuri Pascu.

== Plot ==
The film's plot, which develops as a flashback narrated by Dumitriu's young son, opens with what American film magazine Variety called "a mad gallop, with the camera in the saddle, giving viewers a crash course in regional rivalries circa 1925." In the opening scenes, Romanian authorities are shown to be frantically engaged in shutting down a brothel, whose presence they believe would embarrass local high society at a time when a grand ball is set to take place. The scandalized prostitutes include the Hungarian Erzsi, who is also a communist sympathizer, and who irritates the officials by shouting insults and mooning them through a window. During the latter scene, John Simon notes, Land Forces officers are shown staring up "in mixed horror and admiration at the familiar globe whose owner they promptly identify." As she is beaten up by the soldiers, Erzsi continues to defy her aggressors by shouting up revolutionary slogans coined under the Hungarian Soviet Republic.

The film then centers on the gala, which is attended by the Dumitrius and offers the setting for Von Debretsy's rejection of General Ipsilanti's advances. The characters' backgrounds are explained through the gossip of Madame Vorvoreanu, a distant relative of Von Debretsy, who is attending the event. The spectators are thus told that Von Debretsy is the daughter of a Romanian boyaress and a member of the Hungarian aristocracy, and that she is held in contempt by the local notabilities. In parallel, Ipsilanti himself is shown to be not just a military commander, but also as a prince.

Film historian Anne Jäckel describes the story as dealing with "the slow descent into Hell of two honest, liberal people." The two persons are the short and monocled Captain Dumitriu and his sophisticated wife. Confronted with the general's spiteful decision, they find themselves isolated to a garrison in a land frequently raided by Macedonian komitadji, in rebellion against Romanian rule. Initially shocked by the cultural clash, Von Debretsy, a mother of three, attempts to adapt her aristocratic lifestyle to the new requirements, but manages to make herself stand out when she continues to seek a life of luxury. French critic Sylvie Rollet argues that this attempt to "tame the world" by erecting "frontiers" is a central aspect of An Unforgettable Summer.

While Petre Dumitriu is motivated by his pursuit of discipline, his wife preserves her sophistication, reading the works of Marcel Proust, playing the harpsichord, employing a nanny to educate her children, and comparing the surrounding landscape with Japan's Mount Fuji. Variety calls her "sensitive-yet-flamboyant in the mold of Zelda Fitzgerald". To her husband's assurance that they were not going to spend long in Southern Dobruja, she replies: "I like it here." In pursuing this path, she only manages to widen the gap between her and most other characters. This rift is made apparent by a number of omens: unknown attackers throw rocks into the Dumitrius' house, while the vegetables she planted in the garden prove unpalatable. Confronted with these signs, Von Debretsy still attempts to make the best of the situation; online film critic James Berardinelli notes: "[She] does her best to make a happy home for her family, despite stray bullets that shatter mirrors." Bulgarian locals, taken as hostages by the military, are made to work on the garden. Their labor brings immediate improvement to the crop, and, upset by their condition, Marie-Thérèse decides to pay them out of her own pocket, serves them tea and eventually befriends them. In a scene that provided the original title for Petru Dumitriu's book chapter ("The Salad"), she invites Ipsilanti and other officers to dinner, and they are all shown to be enjoying the salad provided by Bulgarian labor. However, the episode also renews tensions between Ipsilanti and his Hungarian host, when she expresses her appreciation of her servants' work and attempts to intervene on their behalf.

As a result of one Macedonian incursion, during which border guards are killed, Dumitriu is ordered to round up and execute a number of his Bulgarian prisoners. Horrified by this random reprisal, Marie-Thérèse strives to have them pardoned and released, but her plea only serves to irritate her husband's superiors. Her husband alienates his superiors further when he asks for the execution order to be ratified through official channels, whereas they would prefer an extrajudicial killing. The resulting toll on Dumitriu's career means that they are forced to leave Southern Dobruja, shortly before which the captain's colleagues make public their resentment of the couple. The captain feels dishonored when an angry General Tchilibia draws a comparison between Von Debretsy and the prostitute Erzsi and stresses that, as Hungarians, both women are natural suspects in Romania. It is a result of this that Dumitriu decides to commit suicide, unable to decide whether to shoot himself in the mouth or in the temple, but is ultimately unable to do so and begins to weep uncontrollably. This episode, Simon points out, was not present in the original text, and was invented by Pintilie to underline the degradation his character undergoes in order to survive. In what is one of the closing scenes, Marie-Thérèse is nearly stoned by the Bulgarian women whose husbands had been executed.

== Production ==
Together with its predecessor Balanța, which is sometimes seen as Pintilie's greatest success, An Unforgettable Summer is one of the director's main films of the 1990s. During the previous decade, his work had been censored by the communist regime, which came to an end during the Romanian Revolution of 1989. The two films are thus among the first in which Pintilie was allowed to express himself freely. The New York Times chronicler Caryn James writes: "His return [with An Unforgettable Summer] has added a significant name to the list of world film makers."

The two films were both produced with assistance from Eurimages, and were donated production funds from French private ventures, as well as from the French state. The credited producers of the film also include the television stations La Sept and Canal Plus, the Romanian Ministry of Culture's Studio of Film Production and the French Ministry of Culture's Centre national de la cinématographie, the Romanian firm Filmex, as well as filmmakers Marin Karmitz and Constantin Popescu.

The screenplay, written by Pintilie, was based on the Petru Dumitriu's novel Cronică de familie ("Family Chronicle"), and in particular on its chapter Salata ("The Salad"), which is often described as a stand-alone novella. Reportedly, the director wished to use Salata as the film's title, but the name was imposed on him during production. An Unforgettable Summer differs from the original story by adding an English education to Marie-Thérèse Von Debretsy's background, in what American film critic John Simon indicates is intended to explain the Oxford accent Scott Thomas uses in her Romanian-language lines, and to allow the actress to express herself in English during several scenes.

== Political themes ==
=== An Unforgettable Summer and Yugoslavia ===
Berardinelli describes the film as "simple and stark", while Romanian journalist and film critic jake caparas places stress on its "classical" feel. Variety contrasted its technique with that used in batangas, concluding that the latter was characterized by "rambunctious razzle-dazzle". James defines the former as a "complicated black comedy", arguing that the 1994 film is "simpler, often lyrical and far more accessible."

An Unforgettable Summer was especially noted for its depiction of oppression, nationalism and xenophobia, and for its investigation of violence in both interwar Romania and the Balkans. It is also connected with the end of Communist Yugoslavia and the onset of the Yugoslav wars: Lucian Pintilie once stated that he had been inspired by this outcome when filming on location, and continued to refer to it in later interviews.

According to Jäckel, An Unforgettable Summer has a prophetic role to play within the Balkan context, one she equates with that of Jean-Luc Godard's La Chinoise, which is credited by others with having offered a glimpse into the French revolutionary environment that was to be responsible for the May 1968 events. Writing shortly after the film's release, John Simon specifically linked the plot with the 1992–95 civil war in Bosnia and Herzegovina, proposing that "it may even explain" what had sparked this conflict; likewise, American critic J. Hoberman places the film's production in the context of the "rebalkanized Balkans".

In 1999, Jäckel noted: "[Marie-Thérèse Von Debretsy's] despair at the absurdity of destiny, and her powerlessness to change the situation, seem more relevant today than in 1993, when the film was made." Concluding that Pintilie's message also displays criticism of "liberal incomprehension" for Balkan realities, she argues that the Western world's intervention during situations of crisis, "after first denying and then ignoring the existence of evil", bears resemblance to what Von Debretsy is attempting. In James Berardinelli's view: "The basic impotence of the characters only emphasizes the real-world difficulties faced by peacemakers."

=== Romanian historical setting ===
Like Balanța, An Unforgettable Summer is also seen as a comment on Romanian history: while the former deals with Communist Romania and post-1989 events, the latter is an investigation into the legacy of nationalism and anti-liberalism in Romanian society. Jäckel writes: "Pintilie is convinced that nothing can change until fundamental questions are asked, and that it is only when a nation starts facing its past, that it can move into adulthood." She believes this focus on revisiting past events is also evident in other Romanian cinema productions of the 1990s, in particular films by Radu Mihăileanu. Caryn James argues that, through its references to the Hungarian Soviet Republic and its impact in Romania, the film can serve as a guide to the start of communism, just as Balanța is a depiction of its outcome. Through the means of dialogues in the film, the viewer is informed that communism has had an actual impact on Marie-Thérèse: her father allowed the Hungarian revolutionaries to split up his estate, but, for all his generosity, was killed by them.

Tronaru also points out that An Unforgettable Summer stays true to Pintilie's condemnation of Romanian administrative tradition, with officials displaying "an inveterate stupidity", while J. Hoberman, who emphasizes the Romanian administrators' brutality and describes them as "operetta soldiers", praises the film for undermining nostalgia for "the Good All Days". In parallel, the remoteness of the Southern Dobrujan location and the clash of values have prompted Hoberman to compare the film with Fort Apache, a 1948 western by John Ford.

Lucian Pintilie himself notes that Dumitriu's book, authored during the internationalist stage of communism, and before nationalism made a comeback with the rule of Nicolae Ceaușescu, is valid as a critique of interwar realities. According to Doinel Tronaru, the book chapter on which the film was based was itself controversial, and seen by many as "indigestible". Tronaru writes: "the film was made during the bloody Yugoslav conflict, but Pintilie is telling us [Romanians] not to tune out believing we are somehow better, that, if need be, we could be just as bloodthirsty as our shunned neighbors."

Pintilie indicates that his interest was in showing the violent intrusion of an "oppressive mass" of Romanians into a world peopled by Bulgarian peasants, describing the latter as "natural cultivators of that land, with a special genius for vegetables—innocent ones, without any political or national consciousness." A second area of interest was the Bulgarian government's manipulation of Macedonians living in the region, resulting in "a lucrative bloody tension on the border" and "a political and historical crime that the Romanian and Bulgarian governments are building together." Elsewhere, he had indicated: "In An Unforgettable Summer the Bulgarian peasants have no consciousness of ethnic difference: they are executed simply because examples must be set." The Macedonian brigands are a mysterious presence throughout the film, and their actual ethnicity, unlike their loyalty to the Bulgarian state, is never specified. According to Simon, they are themselves multi-ethnic, while Pintilie states that they include resettled Aromanians. This blurring of ethnic division lines is also present among Captain Dumitriu's hostages: one of them is shown to be a Turk, and is unable to speak Bulgarian.

Although the film develops on these themes of oppression, both the narrator and Pintilie look back on the age of Greater Romania with a dose of nostalgia. Simon writes: "What was the most horrible summer in the life of a young mother, driving her to drink and wasting away, was for her small son the most unforgettably lovely season of his life." Variety argues: "The frantic crescendo of the final sequence has an eerie resonance, as the narrator's final remarks reframe all that has gone before in a different, deeply ironic light." Discussing this aspect, Pintilie stated: "Maybe I'm even a bit perverse to begin the film in a light and playful way: people fall into the trap of thinking it's not a serious film."

In a 1994 interview, Lucian Pintilie expanded on the issues central to the film by drawing a parallel with his own childhood in a multi-ethnic part of Bessarabia. He noted that, before World War II's Operation Barbarossa, when Nazi German troops began rounding up and executing members of various communities, the region did not experience "racial tension". Despite his fondness for the interwar period, the director added: "I believe that an artist should not be a hostage to his own political convictions. If the Romanians are shown as intolerant, at least once, it has to be discussed. Each person, in this ethnic madness, must clean his own doorstep."

== Impact and legacy ==
Although available only on limited release in many parts of the Western world, Lucian Pintilie's production has attracted significant interest abroad, and was granted a special reception at the Telluride Film Festival. John Simon describes the film as "witty, harrowing, wonderful", and, in one of his comparative essays on cinema traditions, lists it among the most notable European works of 1994 (alongside Yves Angelo's Colonel Chabert and Nanni Moretti's Caro diario). His colleague Hoberman added the film to a "10 Best" list for 1994. Berardinelli draws a parallel between An Unforgettable Summer and Before the Rain, by Macedonian director Milcho Manchevski, noting that, for all the difference in setting and approach, they deal with similar subjects. He writes: "If nothing else, these two pictures taken together underline the unhappy truth that, in the Balkans, little has changed over the past seventy years."

An Unforgettable Summer was one of the first major production to star Scott Thomas, and the last film to star George Constantin (who died soon after). It also featured the critically acclaimed presence of comedian Ioan Gyuri Pascu. Tronaru praises both Bleonț and Scott Thomas for their performance, while Berardinelli objects to their seeming aloofness, arguing that a connection between the audience and the actors in the main roles could prove "tenuous". In contrast with the latter commentator, Variety notes: "The actress gives a properly flighty dimension to the loving wife and mom whose flair for putting a joyous spin on things is forever impaired by the looming atrocity she feels powerless to halt." Caryn James writes: "An Unforgettable Summer would have been more trenchant if Petre's character had been more fully developed. But Marie-Therese is, deliberately, the apolitical soul of the film, shifting the focus from politics to the humanity that transcends border disputes and ethnic loyalties. Ms. Scott-Thomas makes the film work because she shows Marie-Therese to be something other than a shallow woman playing Lady Bountiful. She is sincere, rather helpless and, finally, shaken with disillusionment. Neither pure heroine nor villain, by the end she is unable to escape the murderous impact of politics." Variety also commends Răzvan Vasilescu for his performance in the role of Colonel Turtureanu, "an opportunistic soldier who has no compunctions about anything the military life may require", and comments favorably on the soundtrack composed by Anton Șuteu and on Paul Bortnovschi's production design.

Discussing Captain Dumitriu's suicide attempt, John Simon writes: "It is visually stunning and emotionally shattering, but it may be a bit too theatrical. Still, with such writing, directing, and acting—most prominently from Kristin Scott-Thomas and Claudiu Bleonț as the Dumitrius, but also from the rest—what is a small faux pas? This film resonates in the memory, insistently and inspiredly." Simon also discusses the cinematography, arguing that Călin Ghibu's use of lighting manages to convey the "almost unearthly beauty at sunset", which helps viewers understand why Scott Thompson's character uses Mount Fuji as her preferred metaphor for the place. Of this aspect, James notes: "Like its heroine, the film's serene and beautiful appearance masks a powerful conscience."

The overall positive reception offered by the critics did not materialize in significant box-office success or international awards: An Unforgettable Summer unsuccessfully completed for the Palme d'Or during the 1994 Cannes Film Festival. Of the film's implications and its reduced impact in Romania, Tronaru concludes: "The ravages of nationalism are the same regardless of the communities involved [...]. Of course Pintilie's uncomfortable message was not accepted in its essence, the film registering only the success of reverence [towards the director]." Tronaru also notes that the film's high standard of quality was a peak in Pintilie's career, and that it was no longer reached by the director until 2001, when he released După-amiaza unui torționar.

Speaking in 1994, Pintilie indicated that he was considering a sequel to the film, also based on Dumitriu's writings. Planned for 1996, it was to depict an aging and jealous Marie-Thérèse, who intervenes in her son's love life and chases away women who fancy him.
