= Octav (film) =

- Directed by: Serge Ioan Celebidachi
- Screenplay by: Serge Ioan Celebidachi; James Olivier
- Produced by: Adela Vrinceanu Celebidachi
- Starring: Marcel Iures; Dana Rogoz; Andi Vasluianu; Victor Rebengiuc
- Release date: 2017
- Countries: Romania; United Kingdom
- Language: Romanian

Octav is a 2017 Romanian drama film directed by Serge Ioan Celebidachi, and produced by Adela Vrinceanu Celebidachi. The title refers to the film's main character. It was selected for the World Cinema section of the Montreal World Film Festival. Octav was the most successful domestic film at the Romanian box office in 2017.

== Synopsis ==
After returning to his family home with the intention to sell the property, an elderly man becomes haunted by memories of his childhood and his former sweetheart.

== Cast ==
- Marcel Iures as Octav
- Dana Rogoz as Ana (19 years old)
- Andi Vasluianu as Marcel
- Maria Obretin as Vera
- Victor Rebengiuc as Spiridon
- Lia Bugnar as Octave's mother
- Ioan Andrei Ionescu as Octave's Father
- Adrian Paduraru as Defense Lawyer
- Stefan Velniciuc as Doctor
- Cristian Bota as Paul (teenager)
- Codin Maticiuc as Property Developer's Assistant
- Camelia Zorlescu as Ana (old)
- Mihai Dinvale as Avram
- Vlad Radescu as Property Developer
- Alexandru Bogdan as Spiridon (teenager)
- Eric Aradits as Octav (child)
- Mircea Constantinescu as Judge 2
- Alessia Tofan as Ana (child)
- Silviu Biris as Mr. Mihailescu
- Mihai Verbintschi as Priest
- Roxana Guttman as Judge 1
- Victor Solomon as Paul (7 years old)
- Monica Ciuta as Mrs. Mihailescu
- Isabella Draghici as Register 1
- Alexandru Mandu as Octave (teenager)
- Alex Harsan as Matei (teenager)
- Dina Rotaru as Register 2
- Andra Illiescu as Nina (child)
- David Bacescu as Matei (child)
- Stelian Soldan as Spiridon (10 years old)
- Tamara Popescu as Judge 3
- Dara Iovitu as Nina (teenager)
- Daniela Voicu as Register 3
- Radu David as Filip
- Dinu Giulio as Stefan (child)

== Production ==
Filming took place from March 21 to April 30, 2016, at Campulung Muscel, Romania and in Cinematographic Studios Bucharest, Buftea.

== Box office ==
The film was the most successful domestic film of 2017 in Romania, with 57,068 admissions and 185,138 EUR / 858,237 RON gross.
