= Stere Gulea =

Romanian film director and screenwriter (born 1943)

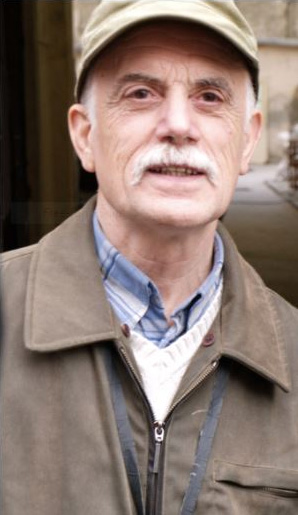
- Born: 2 August 1943 (age 83); Mihail Kogălniceanu, Constanța County, Kingdom of Romania
- Education: Ovidius University; Caragiale National University of Theatre and Film
- Occupations: Film director, screenwriter
- Awards: Order of the Star of Romania, Commander rank Gopo Award for best film

Stere Gulea (born 2 August 1943) is a Romanian film director and screenwriter.

He was born in Mihail Kogălniceanu commune, Constanța County, in an Aromanian family that had fled from the Kaliakra region of Southern Dobruja during the 1940 population exchange between Bulgaria and Romania. After graduating from the Mircea cel Bătrân High School in Constanța, Gulea studied philology at the Pedagogical Institute of Constanța and then pursued his studies at the I.L. Caragiale Institute of Theatre and Film Arts (IATC) in Bucharest, graduating in 1970. He made his film director debut that year with Apa ca un bivol negru ("The Water Like a Black Buffalo"); this documentary movie, done in collaboration with his IATC colleagues, Dan Pița and Mircea Veroiu, record the catastrophic 1970 floods in Romania. In the early 1970s, he produced and directed a Romanian Television documentary based on Mateiu Caragiale's life; his first feature film was Iarba verde de acasă ("The Green Grass from Home", 1978), based on a screenplay by Sorin Titel.

His 1995 movie, State of Things, was submitted by Romania for the Academy Award for Best International Feature Film. In 2019, he won the Gopo Award for best movie with Moromeții 2, This film is a sequel to The Moromete Family (1988), also directed by Gulea, both based on the eponymous novel by Marin Preda. In 2018 Gulea was made honorary citizen of Talpa, the commune in Teleorman County where both these movies were shot.

In 2000, then-President Emil Constantinescu awarded him the Order of the Star of Romania, Commander rank.

== Filmography ==
- Moromeții 2 (2018)
- Sunt o babă comunistă (2013)
- Weekend with my Mother (2009)
- State of Things (1995), also screenplay
- Vulpe - vânător (1993)
- Piata Universității - Romania (1991)
- The Moromete Family (1988), after Marin Preda's novel, Moromeții
- Ochi de urs (1983), screenplay
- Castelul din Carpați (1981), after a Jules Verne novel
- Iarba verde de acasă (1978)
- Apa ca un bivol negru (1970)
