= Too Late (1996 film) =

1996 film

- Directed by: Lucian Pintilie
- Written by: Lucian Pintilie; Răsvan Popescu
- Produced by: Véronique Cayla; Marin Karmitz; Constantin Popescu
- Starring: Cecilia Bârbora
- Cinematography: Calin Ghibu
- Edited by: Victorita Nae
- Music by: Adrian Mantu
- Release date: May 1996
- Running time: 106 minutes
- Country: Romania
- Language: Romanian

Too Late (Romanian: Prea târziu) is a 1996 Romanian drama film directed by Lucian Pintilie. It was entered into the 1996 Cannes Film Festival.

Dumitru Costa, a young trainee prosecutor is entrusted with the investigation about the suspicious death of a Jiu Valley coal miner in 1990s Romania. Accident or murder? Costa is being helped during this investigation by Alina, a good-looking young topographer engineer; it is love at first sight between them both. Two other miners are killed in a long closed down gallery. The investigation relentlessly led by Costa soon begins to bother the local authorities. The mine management dread unrest among the miners who lives under the threat of the closing down of mining development. The officials strive to hush the matter up. Costa and Alina receive threats over the phone.

== Cast ==
- Cecilia Bârbora as Alina Ungureanu
- Răzvan Vasilescu as Costa (the prosecutor)
- Ion Bechet
- Florin Calinescu as Maireanu
- Andreea Banciu as Gilda
- Sorin Cristea as Psychiatrist
- Ion Fiscuteanu as Oana
- Mihai Gruia Sandu as (as Mihai Sandu)
- Lucian Iancu
- Victor Rebengiuc as Elephant Foot
- Mircea Rusu as Munteanu
- Razvan Vasilescu as Dumitri Costa
- Dorel Visan as The prefect
- Luminiţa Gheorghiu
