= Dorel Vișan =

Romanian actor

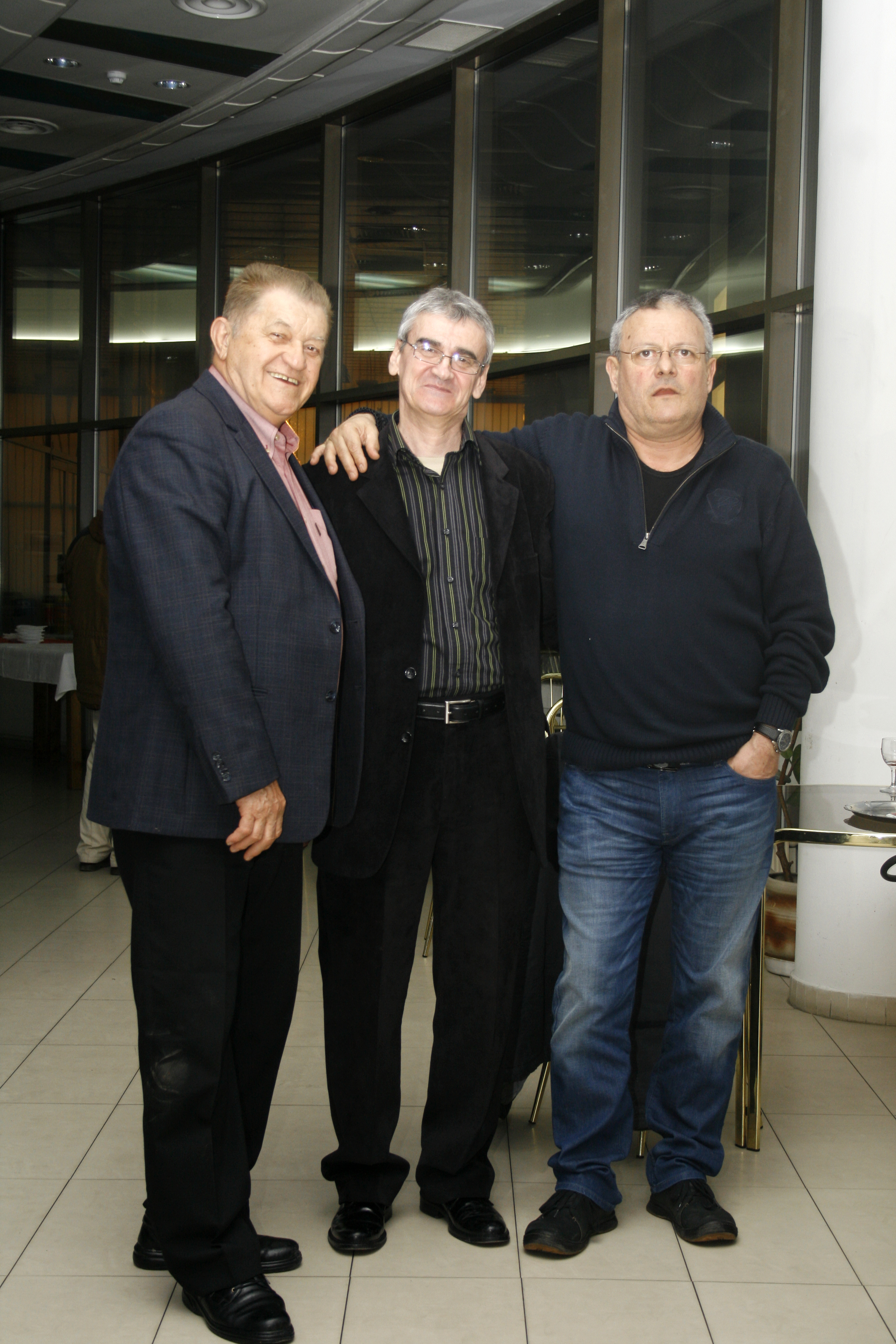
- Dorel Vișan (left) with Corneliu Ionescu and Șerban Marinescu, 2012
- Born: 25 June 1937 (age 89); Tăușeni, Cluj County, Kingdom of Romania
- Education: Caragiale National University of Theatre and Film
- Occupation: Actor
- Years active: 1974–present
- Awards: National Order of Faithful Service, Knight rank

Dorel Vișan (Romanian pronunciation: [doˈrel viˈʃan]; born 25 June 1937) is a Romanian actor. He has appeared in 65 films since 1974. He was nominated for the award of Best Actor at the 1988 European Film Awards.

Vișan was born in Tăușeni, Cluj County. In 1965 he graduated from the I.L. Caragiale Institute of Theatre and Film Arts in Bucharest. After graduating, he was hired as an actor at the Cluj-Napoca National Theatre.

In May 2002 Vișan was awarded the National Order of Faithful Service, Knight rank by then-President Ion Iliescu.

== Selected filmography ==
- A Girl's Tears (1980)
- The Moromete Family (1987)
- Iacob (1988)
- The Oak (1992)
- The Snails' Senator (1995)
- Too Late (1996)
- Occident (2002)
- Sistemul nervos (2005)
- Inimă de țigan (2007)
- Sacrificiul (2019)
- The Fox and The Hound 2- Amos Slade (Romanian voice)
