= The Man of the Day =

1997 film

- Directed by: Dan Pița
- Release date: 1997
- Country: Romania
- Language: Romanian

The Man of the Day (Romanian: Omul zilei) was a 1997 Romanian film directed by Dan Pița.

== Cast ==
- Ștefan Iordache as Andrei
- Alina Chivulescu as Ana
- George Mihăiță as Florentin
- Victor Rebengiuc as Gral. Vlădescu
- Maia Morgenstern
- Cristian Iacob
- Costel Constantin
- Vlad Rădescu
- Vladimir Găitan
- Șerban Celea as Redactorul șef
- Liana Ceterchi
- George Alexandru
- Lia Bugnar
- Robert Mușatescu
- Mihai Niculescu
- Liviu Crăciun
- Monica Davidescu
- Constantin Drăgănescu
- Ion Haiduc
- Mircea Constantinescu
- Doru Ana
- Păstorel Ionescu
- Iancu Lucian
- Nicolae Iliescu
- Alin Câmpan
- Papil Panduru
- Dana Săvuică
- Ioana Moldovan
- Mariana Liurca
- Bogdan Vodă
- Alexandru Jitea
- Ion Bechet
- Marian Gheorghe
- Marian Chirvase
- Petrache Petre
- Alexandru Georgescu
- Emil Mureșan
- Adrian Drăgușin
