= Lucian Pintilie =

Romanian filmmaker (1933–2018)

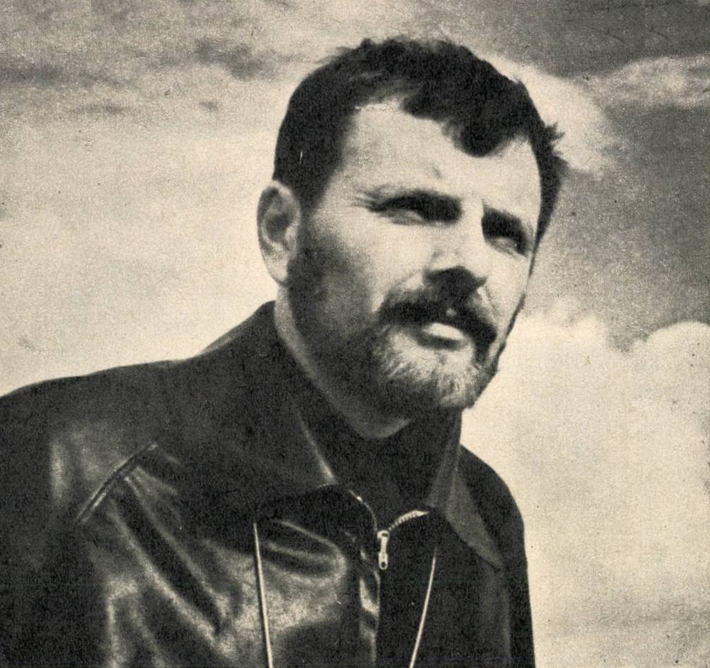
- Photo of Lucian Pintilie
- Born: Lucian Nicolae Pintilie; 9 November 1933; Tarutino, Kingdom of Romania (today Ukraine)
- Died: 16 May 2018 (aged 84); Bucharest, Romania
- Resting place: Bellu Cemetery, Bucharest
- Education: Institute of Theater and Cinematographic Art
- Occupations: Film director, screenwriter

Lucian Pintilie (Romanian pronunciation: [lutʃiˈan pintiˈli.e]; 9 November 1933 – 16 May 2018) was a Romanian theatre, film, and opera director, as well as screenwriter. His career in theatre, opera, film and television has gained him international recognition.

== Biography ==
Pintilie was born in 1933 in Tarutino, at the time in Cetatea Albă County, Kingdom of Romania. After attending the Cantemir Vodă and Ion Luca Caragiale high schools in Bucharest, he graduated from the Institute of Theater and Cinematographic Art in Bucharest. He died in Bucharest at age 84 and was buried in the city's Bellu Cemetery.

== Theatre ==
=== Romania ===
From 1960 to 1972, Pintilie was resident director at the Bulandra Theatre in Bucharest. His productions there included George Bernard Shaw's Cesar and Cleopatra, Lorraine Hansberry's A Place in the Sun, William Saroyan's My Heart's in the Highlands, Max Frisch's Biedermann and the Firebugs, Nikolai Gogol's Inspector General and Anton Chekhov's Cherry Orchard. He also directed the Romanian classic comedy Carnival Scenes by Ion Luca Caragiale, which won the 1967 Prize for the best direction and best production at the National festival of theatre in Romania.

=== France ===
From 1973 to 1982, he directed mainly in France at the Théâtre national de Chaillot and the Théâtre de la Ville where he staged, among other plays, Carlo Gozzi's Turandot, Henrik Ibsen's Wild Duck, and Anton Chekhov's Three Sisters and Seagull.

=== United States ===
In the United States, in addition to his work at the Guthrie Theater in Minneapolis, Pintilie staged Tartuffe, The Wild Duck, and The Cherry Orchard at Arena Stage.

== Opera ==
In France, he also directed several operas including a production of Oresteia by Aurel Stroe, based on the Greek tragedy, at the Festival in Avignon and Mozart's Magic Flute at the Festival in Aix-en-Provence. He also directed Bizet's Carmen for the Welsh National Opera of Cardiff, Wales.

== Films (selection) ==
His films brought him international reputation.

Sunday at Six o Clock won the Prize of the Jury at the International film festival in Mar del Plata, Argentina in 1966, and the Grand Prize of the Jury at the International Encounter of Films for Youth at Cannes, France, in 1967.

In 1968, he directed The Reenactment, considered by film historians to be the most important representation of Romanian cinema.

In 1975, he filmed for Yugoslavian television Ward Six, his own adaptation of Chekhov's famous story. It won the Catholic Film Office Prize at the Cannes film festival.

== Filmography ==
- Sunday at Six o Clock (Duminică la ora șase; 1965; director)
- The Reenactment (Reconstituirea; 1968; screenwriter and director)
- Ward Six (Paviljon VI; 1978; director)
- Carnival Scenes (De ce trag clopotele, Mitică?; 1982; screenwriter and director) - see also the "Portrayals and tributes" section at Mitică
- The Oak (Balanța; 1992; screenwriter, producer and director)
- An Unforgettable Summer (1994; screenwriter and director)
- Too Late (Prea târziu; 1996; screenwriter and director)
- Next Stop Paradise (Terminus Paradis; 1998; screenwriter and director)
- The Afternoon of a Torturer (2001; screenwriter and director)
- Niki and Flo (2003; director)
- Tertium non datur (2006; screenwriter and director). For title meaning see Law of excluded middle.
