= Răzvan Vasilescu =

Romanian actor

- Born: 14 August 1954 (age 71); Ploiești, Prahova, Romania
- Occupation: Actor
- Years active: 1979–present

Răzvan Vasilescu (Romanian pronunciation: [rəzˈvan vasiˈlesku]; born 14 August 1954) is a Romanian actor. He has appeared in 40 films and television shows since 1979. He starred in The Oak, which was screened out of competition at the 1992 Cannes Film Festival.

== Selected filmography ==
- The Oak (1992)
- Betrayal (1993)
- An Unforgettable Summer (1994)
- State of Things (1995)
- Too Late (1996)
- Nekro (1997)
- Train of Life (1998)
- Terminus Paradis (1998)
- Stuff and Dough (2001)
- Niki and Flo (2003)
- Offset (2004)
- California Dreamin' (2007)
- Fire and Ice: The Dragon Chronicles (2009)
- Ashes and Blood (2009)
- Bibliothèque Pascal (2010)
- Gainsbourg: A Heroic Life (2010)
- Portrait of the Fighter as a Young Man (2010)
- Somewhere in Palilula (2012)
- Mirage (2014)
