= Ovidiu Iuliu Moldovan =

Romanian actor

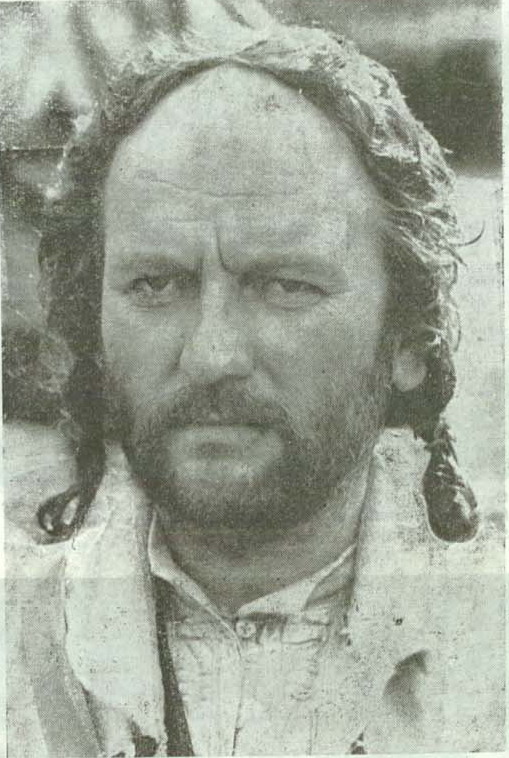

Ovidiu Iuliu Moldovan (Romanian: [oˈvidju ˈjulju moldoˈvan]; January 1, 1942 – March 12, 2008) was a Romanian actor known for his work in Romanian film and television roles. However, Moldovan focused almost exclusively on theater and stage roles during the later years of his career.

Moldovan was born on January 1, 1942, in Vișinelu, Mureș County. He was awarded the UNITER prize for his career achievements as a Romanian actor in 2004.

He died of cancer at the age of 66 at the University Hospital in Bucharest, Romania, on March 12, 2008, and was buried at Bellu Cemetery.

His last theater role was in the Romanian play, Celălalt Cioran, which means The Other Cioran. Moldovan's final play was named after Romanian philosopher, Emil Cioran.

Romanian President Traian Băsescu posthumously appointed Moldovan Knight of the Order of the Star of Romania on March 15, 2008.

== Selected filmography ==
- 1973 - Despre o anume fericire, directed by Mihai Constantinescu
- 1975 - Actorul și sălbaticii
- 1975 - Hyperion
- 1975 - Cercul magic, regia David Reu
- 1976 - Dincolo de pod
- 1976 - Ultimele zile ale verii
- 1976 - Misterul lui Herodot
- 1976 - Bunicul și doi delincvenți minori
- 1976 - Trei zile și trei nopți
- 1977 - Tufă de Veneția
- 1978 - Profetul, aurul și ardelenii
- 1978 - Avaria - Hristu
- 1978 - Buzduganul cu trei peceți
- 1979 - Între oglinzi paralele
- 1979 - Un om în loden
- 1979 - Cumpăna
- 1980 - Artista, dolarii și ardelenii
- 1980 - Bietul Ioanide
- 1981 - Pruncul, petrolul și ardelenii
- 1981 - Castelul din Carpați
- 1981 - Detașamentul „Concordia”
- 1981 - Duelul
- 1982 - Semnul șarpelui
- 1982 - Întîlnirea
- 1982 - Cucerirea Angliei
- 1983 - Viraj periculos
- 1983 - Misterele Bucureștilor
- 1983 - Dreptate în lanțuri
- 1983 - Acțiunea Zuzuc, directed by Gheorghe Naghi
- 1984 - Sosesc păsările călătoare
- 1984 - Vreau să știu de ce am aripi, directed by Nicu Stan
- 1984 - Horea
- 1985 - Masca de argint
- 1985 - Din prea multă dragoste
- 1986 - Punct și de la capăt, directed by Alexa Visarion
- 1986 - Cuibul de viespi, directed by Horea Popescu
- 1987 - Egreta de fildeș
- 1989 - Flori de gheață, directed by Anghel Mira
- 1989 - Misiunea - TV series, directed by Virgil Calotescu
- 1992 - Krystallines nyhtes
- 1994 - Somnul insulei
- 1994 - Nopți de cristal, directed by Tonia Marketaki
- 1995 - Craii de Curtea-Veche, directed by Mircea Veroiu
- 1996 - Crăciun însângerat, directed by Claudio Nasso
- 1999 - Anii tinereții noastre (1999) - as Narrator
