= I. L. Caragiale National University of Theatre and Film =

Theatre and film university in Bucharest, Romania

Coordinates: 44.437541°N 26.129853°E

- Universitatea Națională de Artă Teatrală și Cinematografică "I. L. Caragiale"
- Other name: UNATC
- Type: Public
- Established: 1954
- Rector: Liviu Lucaci
- Location: Str. Matei Voievod, nr. 75-77, Sector 2, Bucharest, Romania
- Campus: Urban
- Website: unatc.ro
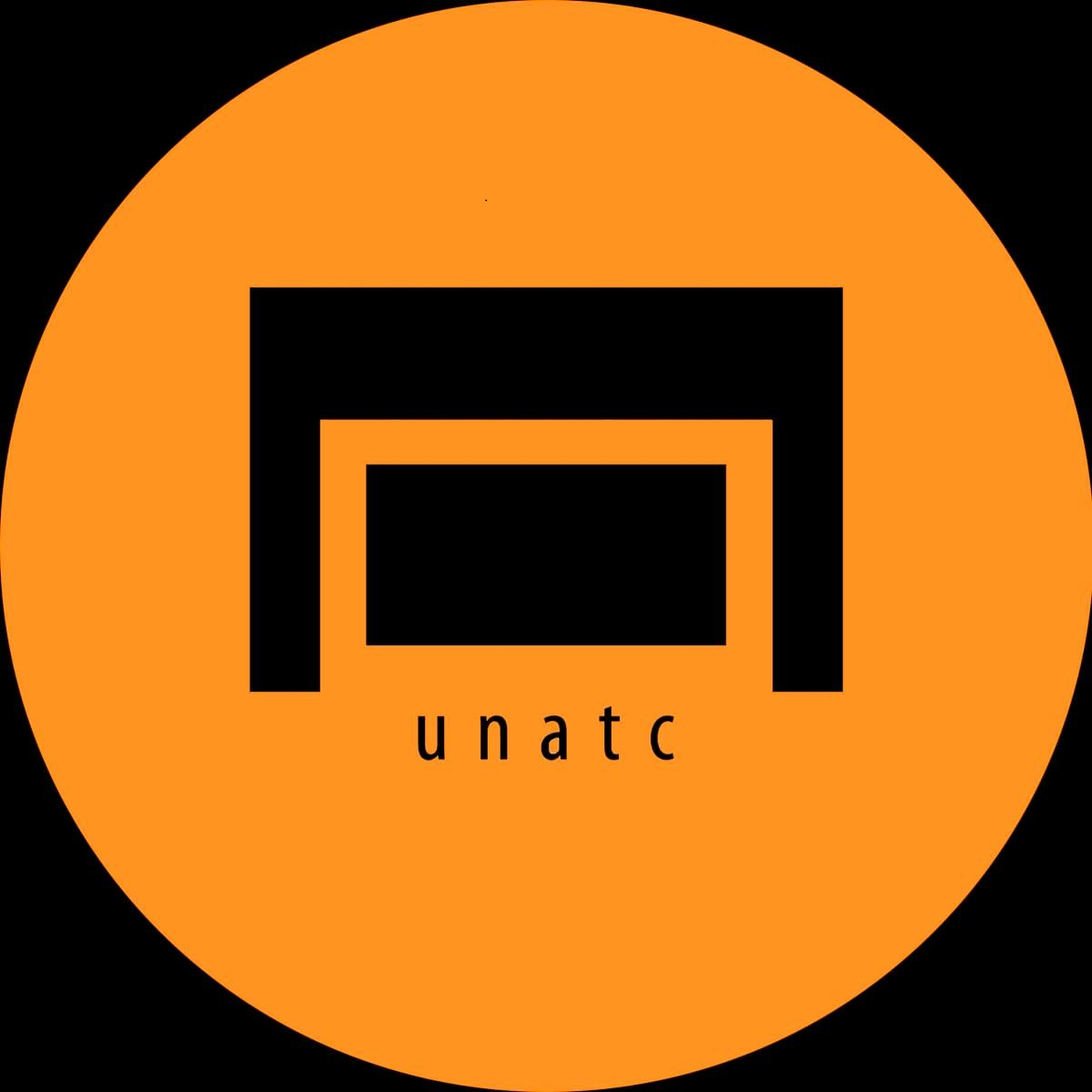

The I. L. Caragiale National University of Theatre and Film (Romanian: Universitatea Națională de Artă Teatrală și Cinematografică "I. L. Caragiale") is a public university in Bucharest, Romania, founded in 1954. It is named in honour of playwright Ion Luca Caragiale.

== History ==
=== First theatre school ===
The first theatre faculty in Bucharest began its activity in 1834 within the Philharmonic School.

=== IATC and precursors (1948–1990) ===
A Faculty of Stage Direction opened in 1948 within the Romanian Art Institute, at that time the center of all Romanian higher education in the arts.

The year 1950 saw the founding of the Institute for Film and the Institute for Theatre I. L. Caragiale (named after the classic Romanian playwright). In 1954, the two institutions merged into the I.L. Caragiale Institute of Theatre and Film Arts (IATC).

=== After 1990 ===
The institute functioned under this name until 1990, when it became the Academy of Theatre and Film – the only such school in Romania with a ranking equal to that of a university and with international recognition.

Since 1990, the Academy of Theatre and Film has undergone a continuous reform process. New specializations have been added, such as audiovisual communication and multimedia sound editing (at the Film Faculty), puppets, marionettes, choreography and scenography (at the Theatre Faculty). The number of students has gone up, while the curricula and study programs have been continuously improved and diversified.

In 1998, the Academy of Theatre and Film became the University of Theatre and Film I.L. Caragiale. In 2001, it became the National University of Theatre and Film I.L. Caragiale.

== Notable alumni ==
(This list includes alumni from both the Film and the Acting schools.)

- Ion Al-George, playwright and poet
- Elena Albu, actress
- Mircea Albulescu, actor
- George Alexandru, actor
- Violeta Andrei, actress
- Ludovic Antal, actor
- Mitzura Arghezi, actress and politician
- Chris Avram, actor
- Leopoldina Bălănuță, actress
- Paul Barbă Neagră, film director
- Marga Barbu, actress
- Constantin Barcaroiu, actor, writer, and politician
- Alina Bârgăoanu, university professor
- Zaharia Bârsan, playwright, poet, and actor
- Gheorghe Becescu-Silvan, writer and politician
- Andreea Bibiri, actress and theatre director
- Andrei Blaier, film director
- Claudiu Bleonț, actor
- Elisabeta Bostan, film director
- Emil Botta, actor
- Olga Bucătaru, actress
- Dragoș Bucur, actor
- Ioana Bulcă, actress
- Romuald Bulfinsky, actor and manager
- Florin Călinescu, actor, television presenter and politician
- Rozina Cambos, actress
- Nae Caranfil, film director
- Adi Carauleanu, actor
- Dan Condurache, actor
- George Constantin, actor
- Mihai Constantinescu, film director
- Gheorghe Cozorici, actor
- Ioana Crăciunescu, actress
- Alexandru Dabija, actor
- Theodor Danetti, actor
- Gheorghe Dănilă, actor
- Alexandru Darie, theater director
- Iurie Darie, actor
- Mircea Diaconu, actor and politician
- Ion Dichiseanu, actor
- Puși Dinulescu, playwright and director
- Dana Dogaru, actress
- Sinișa Dragin, film director
- Catrinel Dumitrescu, actress
- Toma Enache, film director
- David Esrig, theatre director
- Ioan Fiscuteanu, actor
- Ioana Flora, actress
- Radu Gabrea, film director and screenwriter
- Valeria Gagealov, actress
- Tudor Gheorghe, musician
- Luminița Gheorghiu, actress
- Tudor Giurgiu, film director
- Manuela Hărăbor, actress
- Hanno Höfer, film director
- Emil Hossu, actor
- Ștefan Iancu, actor
- Indiggo, the twin sisters Gabriela and Mihaela Modorcea, singer-songwriters and reality television personalities
- Cristina Ionda, actress and presenter
- Marcel Iureș, actor
- Radu Jude, film director
- Manole Marcus, film director, screenwriter
- Nicolae Mărgineanu, film director, screenwriter
- Iulian Mihu, film director
- Mihaela Mitrache, actress
- Maia Morgenstern, actress
- Cristian Mungiu, filmmaker
- Radu Muntean, film director, screenwriter
- Mircea Mureșan, film director
- Bogdan Mustață, film director
- Paul Negoescu, film director
- Cristian Nemescu, film director
- Barna Nemethi, film director and photographer
- Călin Peter Netzer, film director
- Margareta Niculescu, puppeteer and theater director
- Eugen Pădureanu, actor
- Sebastian Papaiani, actor
- Dorotheea Petre, actress
- Irina Petrescu, actress
- Florin Piersic, actor
- Florin Piersic, Jr., actor, writer, and director
- Adrian Pintea, actor
- Adina Pintilie, film director
- Lucian Pintilie, theatre, film, and opera director
- George Piștereanu, actor
- Florian Pittiș, actor, singer, and theater director
- Maria Ploae, actress
- Margareta Pogonat, actress
- Tania Popa, actress
- Stela Popescu, actress
- Rodica Popescu Bitănescu, actress
- Corneliu Porumboiu, film director
- Dan Puric, actor and theater director
- Victor Rebengiuc, actor
- Marcel Roșca, Olympic pistol shooter
- Geo Saizescu, actor and film director
- Alec Secăreanu, actor
- Gabriel Spahiu, actor
- Saviana Stănescu, playwright
- Silviu Stănculescu, actor
- Eusebiu Ștefănescu, actor
- Cosmina Stratan, journalist and film actress
- Valentin Teodosiu, actor
- Ana Ularu, actress
- Bogdan Ulmu, theatre director and writer
- Melania Ursu, actress
- Tora Vasilescu, actress
- Andi Vasluianu, actor
- Mircea Veroiu, film director, screenwriter
- Dorel Vișan, actor
- Gheorghe Vitanidis, film director
- Florin Zamfirescu, actor
