= Talpa, Teleorman =

Talpa
- Commune
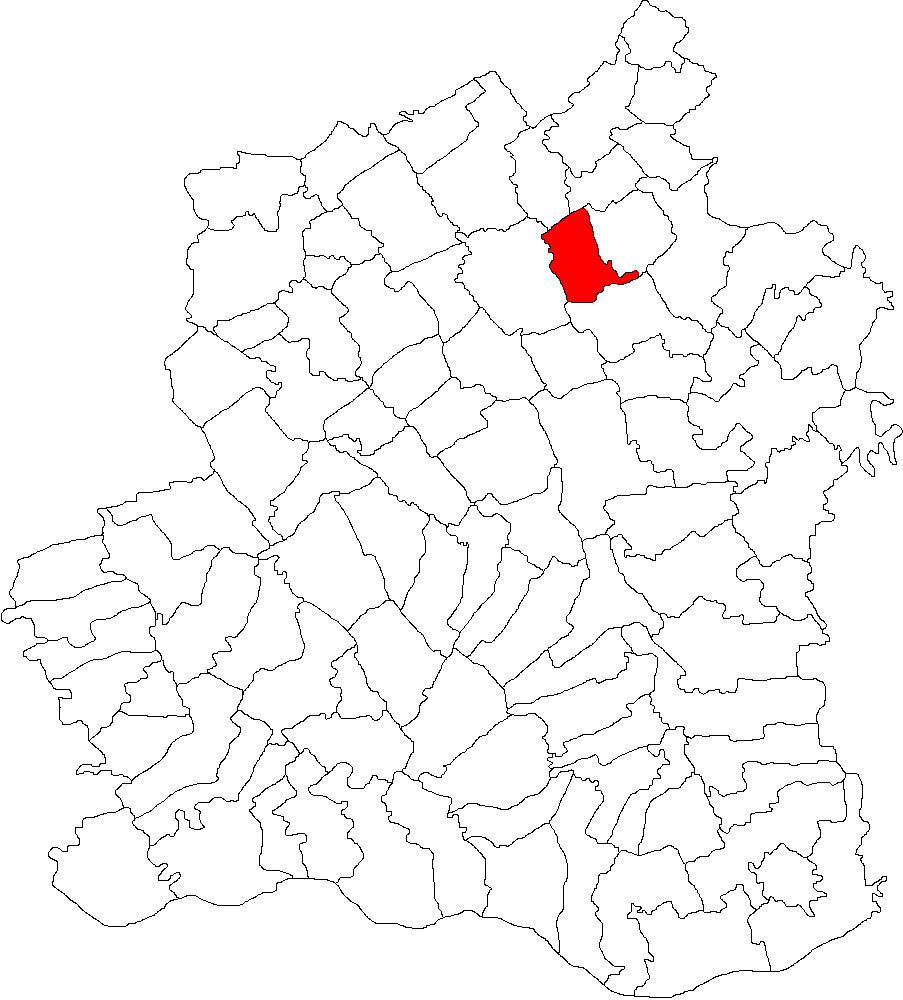
- Location in Teleorman County

- Location in Romania
- Coordinates: 44°17′N 25°18′E
- Country: Romania
- County: Teleorman
- Subdivisions: Linia Costii, Rotărești, Talpa-Bâscoveni, Talpa-Ogrăzile, Talpa Poștei

Government
  - Mayor (2020–2024): Cleofir Netejoru (PNL)
- Area: 42.9 km^{2} (16.6 sq mi)
- Elevation: 117 m (384 ft)
- Population (2021-12-01): 1,679
  - Density: 39/km^{2} (100/sq mi)
- Time zone: EET/EEST (UTC+2/+3)
- Postal code: 147380
- Area code: +(40) 247
- Vehicle reg.: TR
- Website: www.comuna-talpa.ro

Talpa is a commune in Teleorman County, Muntenia, Romania. It is composed of five villages: Linia Costii, Rotărești, Talpa-Bâscoveni, Talpa-Ogrăzile (the commune center), and Talpa Poștei.

The commune is situated in the Wallachian Plain. It is located in the northern part of Teleorman County, 45 km (28 mi) from the county seat, Alexandria.

The 1987 movie The Moromete Family, as well as its 2018 sequel, Moromeții 2, were shot in Talpa.
