= The Oak =

1992 film

- Directed by: Lucian Pintilie
- Written by: Lucian Pintilie; Ion Băieșu
- Produced by: Sylvain Bursztejn; Lucian Pintilie; Eliane Stutterheim
- Starring: Maia Morgenstern
- Cinematography: Doru Mitran
- Edited by: Victorița Nae
- Release date: 16 September 1992
- Running time: 105 minutes
- Country: Romania
- Language: Romanian

The Oak (Romanian: Balanța) is a 1992 Romanian drama film co-written and directed by Lucian Pintilie. Starring Maia Morgenstern, Razvan Vasilescu, Victor Rebengiuc. It was screened out of competition at the 1992 Cannes Film Festival.

== Cast ==
- Maia Morgenstern as Nela
- Răzvan Vasilescu as Mitică
- Victor Rebengiuc as Village mayor
- Dorel Vișan as Country Priest
- Ion Pavlescu as Doctor Gîlcescu
- Mariana Mihuț as Priest's wife
- Gheorghe Visu as Priest in the train
- Dan Condurache as Prosecutor
- Virgil Andriescu as Nela's father
- Matei Alexandru as Butușină
- Leopoldina Bălănuță as Nela's mother
- Magda Catone as Mitică's assistant
- Ionel Mihăilescu as Titi
- Florin Călinescu as Securitate agent
