= List of accolades received by 4 Months, 3 Weeks and 2 Days =

4 Months, 3 Weeks and 2 Days is a 2007 Romanian art film written and directed by Cristian Mungiu, starring Anamaria Marinca, Laura Vasiliu and Vlad Ivanov. The film is set in Communist Romania in the final years of the Nicolae Ceaușescu era. It tells the story of two students, roommates in a university dormitory, who try to procure an illegal abortion.

After making its world premiere on the first day at the Cannes Film Festival in May 2007, it won three awards, including the Palme d'Or. Mungiu became the first Romanian filmmaker to win the Palme d'Or, the festival's highest honour. Later, it became the first Romanian work to receive the European Film Award for Best Film. It also won Best Film at Romania's national Gopo Awards.

Despite competing for the Academy Award for Best Foreign Language Film, 4 Months, 3 Weeks and 2 Days was not shortlisted, creating controversy among critics and online film fans, as it had won the Palme d'Or. The controversy caused an Academy member to pledge nomination reform, though the category had often sparked criticism. Mungiu later said the omission and subsequent furor brought the picture substantial publicity, and that the experience taught him that critics and festival juries have differing tastes from the academy.

== Accolades ==
Award	Date of ceremony	Category	Recipient(s)	Result	Ref(s)
Alliance of Women Film Journalists	2007	Best Foreign Film	Cristian Mungiu	Nominated	
Alliance of Women Film Journalists	2007	Best of the Fests	Cristian Mungiu	Won	
Argentine Academy of Cinematography Arts and Sciences Awards	December 2008	Best Foreign Film	Cristian Mungiu	Won	
Australian Film Critics Association	January 2008	Best Overseas Film	Cristian Mungiu	Nominated	
BBC Four World Cinema Awards	January 2009	BBC Four World Cinema Award	Cristian Mungiu	Won	
Cannes Film Festival	16 – 27 May 2007	Palme d'Or	Cristian Mungiu	Won	
Cannes Film Festival	16 – 27 May 2007	FIPRESCI Prize	Cristian Mungiu	Won	
Cannes Film Festival	16 – 27 May 2007	Cinema Prize of the French National Education System	Cristian Mungiu	Won	
César Awards	22 February 2008	Best Foreign Film	Cristian Mungiu	Nominated	
Chicago Film Critics Association	13 December 2007	Best Foreign Language Film	Cristian Mungiu	Won	
Critics' Choice Awards	7 January 2008	Best Foreign Language Film	Cristian Mungiu	Nominated	
Dallas-Fort Worth Film Critics Association	17 December 2007	Best Foreign Language Film	Cristian Mungiu	Nominated	
David di Donatello	18 April 2008	Best European Film	Cristian Mungiu	Nominated	
European Film Awards	1 December 2007	Best Film	Cristian Mungiu, Oleg Mutu	Won	
European Film Awards	1 December 2007	Best Director	Cristian Mungiu	Won	
European Film Awards	1 December 2007	Best Screenwriter	Cristian Mungiu	Nominated	
European Film Awards	1 December 2007	Best Actress	Anamaria Marinca	Nominated	
Golden Globe Awards	13 January 2008	Best Foreign Language Film	Cristian Mungiu	Nominated	
Gopo Awards	3 March 2008	Best Feature Film	Cristian Mungiu, Oleg Mutu	Won	
Gopo Awards	3 March 2008	Best Director	Cristian Mungiu	Won	
Gopo Awards	3 March 2008	Best Screenplay	Cristian Mungiu	Nominated	
Gopo Awards	3 March 2008	Best Actress	Anamaria Marinca	Won	
Gopo Awards	3 March 2008	Best Supporting Actress	Laura Vasiliu	Won	
Gopo Awards	3 March 2008	Best Supporting Actress	Luminita Gheorghiu	Nominated	
Gopo Awards	3 March 2008	Best Supporting Actor	Vlad Ivanov	Won	
Gopo Awards	3 March 2008	Best Supporting Actor	Alexandru Potocean	Nominated	
Gopo Awards	3 March 2008	Best Cinematography	Oleg Mutu	Won	
Gopo Awards	3 March 2008	Best Editing	Dana Bunescu	Nominated	
Gopo Awards	3 March 2008	Best Sound	Cristian Tarnovetchi, Constantin Fleancu, Dana Bunescu	Won	
Gopo Awards	3 March 2008	Best Production Design	Mihaela Poenaru	Won	
Gopo Awards	3 March 2008	Best Costumes	Dana Istrate	Nominated	
Gopo Awards	3 March 2008	Young Hope	Laura Vasiliu	Nominated	
Gopo Awards	3 March 2008	Audience Award	Cristian Mungiu	Won	
Goya Awards	1 February 2009	Best European Film	Cristian Mungiu	Won	
Hollywood Film Festival	October 2007	Hollywood World Award	Cristian Mungiu	Won	
Independent Spirit Awards	23 February 2008	Best Foreign Film	Cristian Mungiu	Nominated	
London Film Critics Circle	8 February 2008	Best Foreign Language Film	Cristian Mungiu	Nominated	
London Film Critics Circle	8 February 2008	Best Director	Cristian Mungiu	Nominated	
London Film Critics Circle	8 February 2008	Best Actress	Anamaria Marinca	Nominated	
Los Angeles Film Critics Association	9 December 2007	Best Actress	Anamaria Marinca	Runner-up	
Los Angeles Film Critics Association	9 December 2007	Best Supporting Actor	Vlad Ivanov	Won	
Los Angeles Film Critics Association	9 December 2007	Best Foreign Language Film	Cristian Mungiu	Won	
LUX Prize	24 October 2007	Best Film	Cristian Mungiu	Shortlisted	
National Board of Review	15 January 2008	Top 5 Foreign Language Film	Cristian Mungiu	Won	
National Society of Film Critics	5 January 2008	Best Foreign Language Film	Cristian Mungiu	Won	
New York Film Critics Circle	10 December 2008	Best Foreign Language Film	Cristian Mungiu	Won	
Palm Springs Film Festival	January 2008	Best Actress	Anamaria Marinca	Won	
Palm Springs Film Festival	January 2008	Best Actress	Laura Vasiliu	Won	
San Sebastián International Film Festival	September 2007	FIPRESCI Prize	Cristian Mungiu	Won	
Satellite Awards	16 December 2007	Best Foreign Language Film	Cristian Mungiu	Nominated	
Silver Condor Awards	15 September 2008	Best Foreign Language Film	Cristian Mungiu	Nominated	
Stockholm International Film Festival	15 – 25 November 2007	Bronze Horse	Cristian Mungiu	Won	
Stockholm International Film Festival	15 – 25 November 2007	Best Actress	Anamaria Marinca	Won	
Toronto Film Critics Association	18 December 2007	Best Foreign Language Film	Cristian Mungiu	Won	
Vancouver Film Critics Circle	18 February 2008	Best Foreign Language Film	Cristian Mungiu	Won	
Village Voice Film Poll	December 2007	Best Film	Cristian Mungiu	4th Place	
Village Voice Film Poll	December 2007	Best Actress	Anamaria Marinca	Won	
Village Voice Film Poll	December 2007	Best Supporting Actor	Vlad Ivanov	6th Place	
Vilnius International Film Festival	Spring 2008	The Audience Award	The Film	Won	
