= Tania Popa =

Romanian actress

- Pronunciation: tania popa
- Born: 19 January 1973 (age 53); Căușeni
- Education: I. L. Caragiale Institute of Theatre and Film
- Occupation: Actress
- Years active: 1992 - present
- Employer: National Theatre Bucharest
- Notable work: Occident
- Children: 2

Tania Popa (born 19 January 1973) is a Romanian actress.

== Selected filmography ==
=== Film ===
Year	Title	Role
1992	The Oak	
1996	Too Late	
2001	Everyday God Kisses Us On The Mouth	
2001	Patul lui Procust (Procust's Bed	Emilia
2002	Occident	Mihaela
2005	The Marksman	Valentina Benkova
2006	The Detonator	Ana
2006	Offset	
2007	4 Months, 3 Weeks and 2 Days	
2008	My Mother, My Bride and I	
2009	Tales from the Golden Age	Camelia
2012	Beyond the Hills	
2013	Child's Pose (film)	
2013	I Am An Old Communist Hag	Aurelia
2017	Ana, mon amour	Mama Ana

=== TV ===
- Your Face Sounds Familiar (Season 8, 2015)
- The national selection for the Eurovision Song Contest 2017
- The Farm (Season 3, 2018)

== Stage ==
- God of Carnage (2010)
