= 2007 Los Angeles Film Critics Association Awards =

Entertainment accolade

33rd LAFCA Awards
- Date: December 9, 2007

Highlights
- Best Picture: There Will Be Blood

The 33rd Los Angeles Film Critics Association Awards, given by the Los Angeles Film Critics Association (LAFCA), honored the best in film for 2007.

== Winners ==
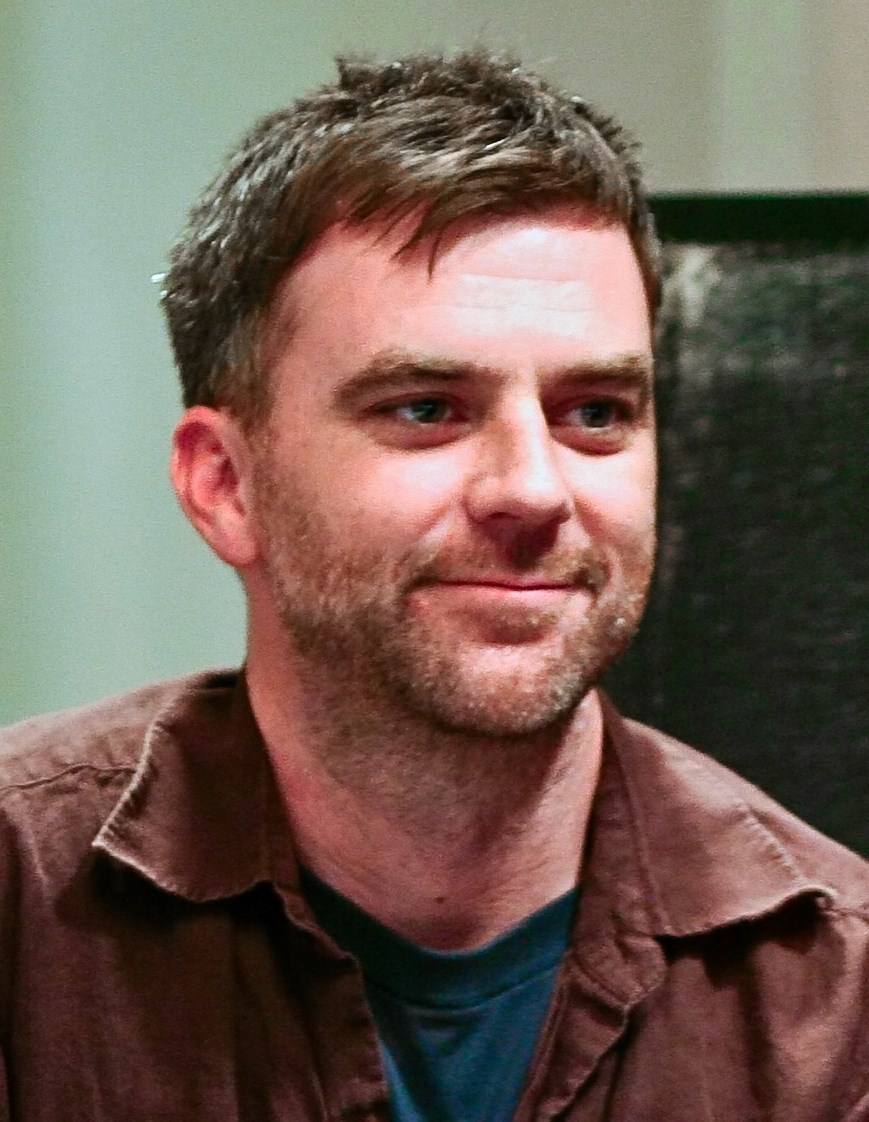
Paul Thomas Anderson, Best Director winner

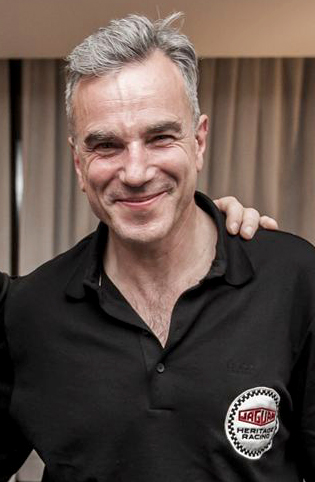
Daniel Day-Lewis, Best Actor winner

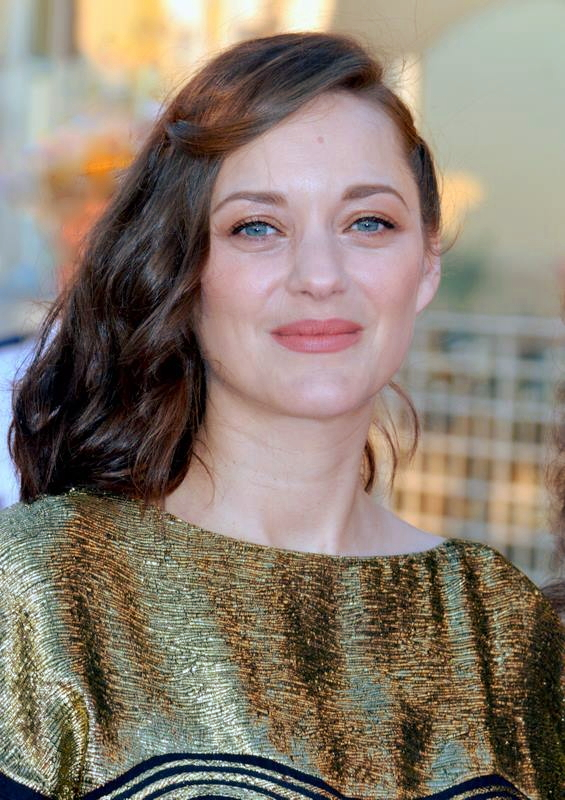
Marion Cotillard, Best Actress winner

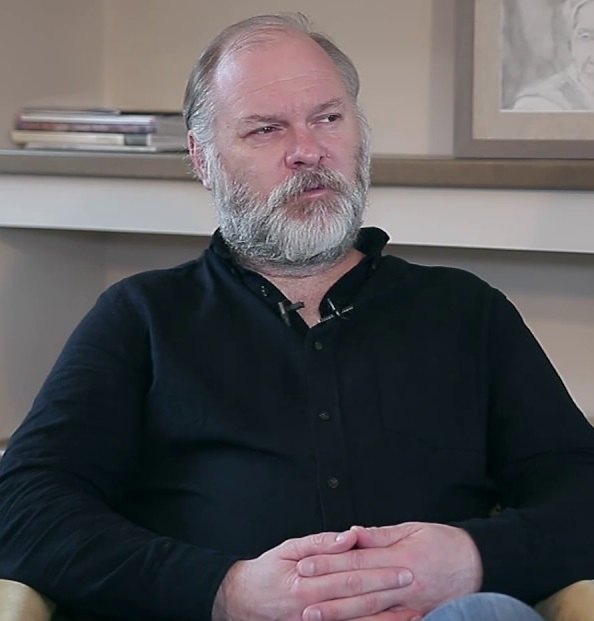
Vlad Ivanov, Best Supporting Actor winner

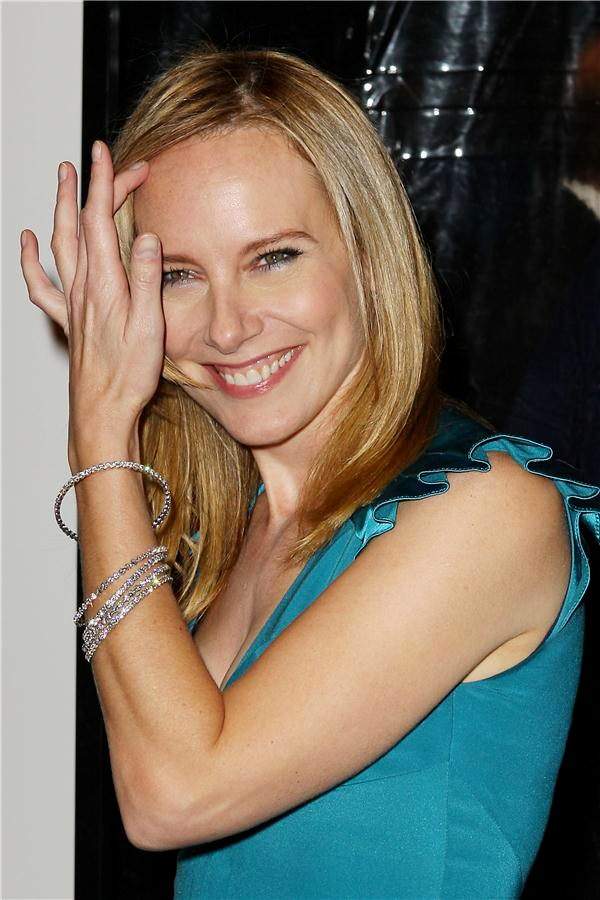
Amy Ryan, Best Supporting Actress winner

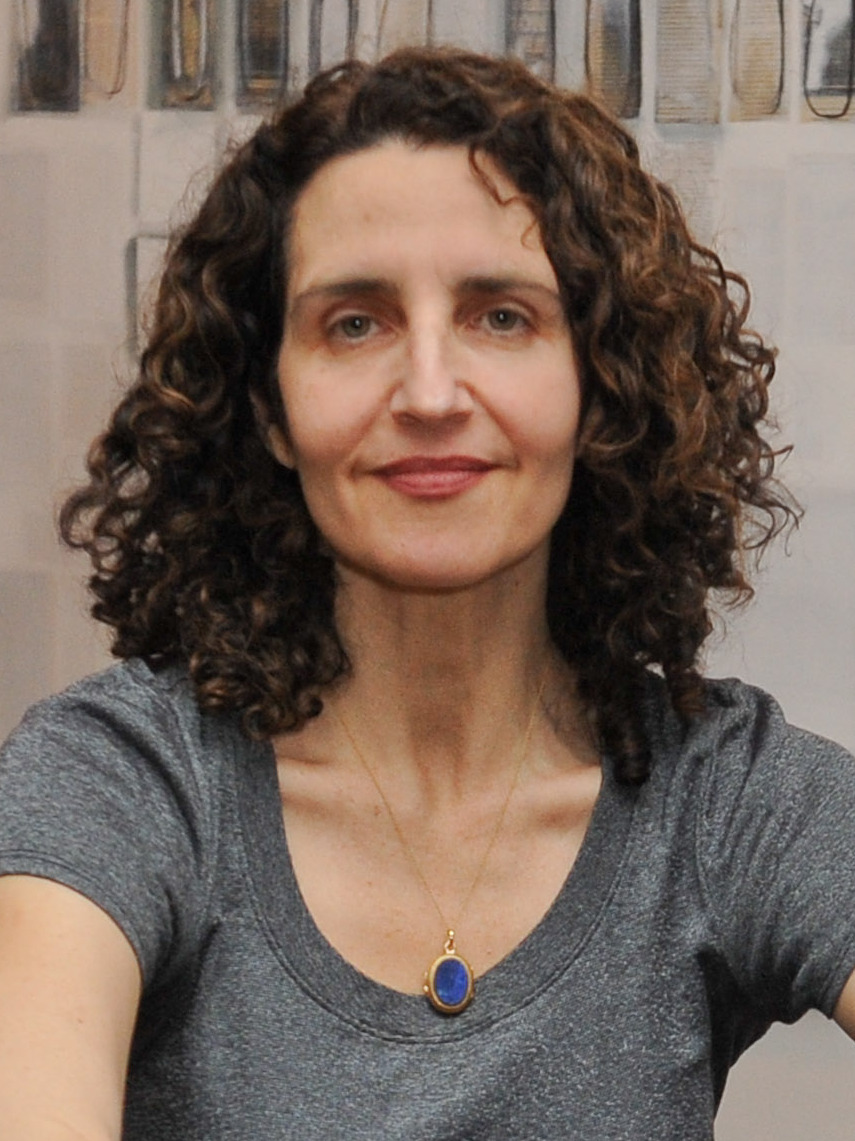
Tamara Jenkins, Best Screenplay winner

- Best Picture:
  - There Will Be Blood
  - Runner-up: The Diving Bell and the Butterfly (Le scaphandre et le papillon)
- Best Director:
  - Paul Thomas Anderson – There Will Be Blood
  - Runner-up: Julian Schnabel – The Diving Bell and the Butterfly (Le scaphandre et le papillon)
- Best Actor:
  - Daniel Day-Lewis – There Will Be Blood
  - Runner-up: Frank Langella – Starting Out in the Evening
- Best Actress:
  - Marion Cotillard – La Vie en Rose (La Môme)
  - Runner-up: Anamaria Marinca – 4 Months, 3 Weeks and 2 Days (4 luni, 3 săptămâni și 2 zile)
- Best Supporting Actor:
  - Vlad Ivanov – 4 Months, 3 Weeks and 2 Days (4 luni, 3 săptămâni și 2 zile)
  - Runner-up: Hal Holbrook – Into the Wild
- Best Supporting Actress:
  - Amy Ryan – Before the Devil Knows You're Dead and Gone Baby Gone
  - Runner-up: Cate Blanchett – I'm Not There
- Best Screenplay:
  - Tamara Jenkins – The Savages
  - Runner-up: Paul Thomas Anderson – There Will Be Blood
- Best Cinematography:
  - Janusz Kamiński – The Diving Bell and the Butterfly (Le scaphandre et le papillon)
  - Runner-up: Robert Elswit – There Will Be Blood
- Best Production Design:
  - Jack Fisk – There Will Be Blood
  - Runner-up: Dante Ferretti – Sweeney Todd: The Demon Barber of Fleet Street
- Best Music Score:
  - Glen Hansard and Markéta Irglová – Once
  - Runner-up: Jonny Greenwood – There Will Be Blood
- Best Documentary/Non-Fiction Film:
  - No End in Sight
  - Runner-up: Sicko
- Best Animation (TIE):
  - Persepolis
  - Ratatouille
- Best Foreign Language Film:
  - 4 Months, 3 Weeks and 2 Days (4 luni, 3 săptămâni și 2 zile) • Romania
  - Runner-up: The Diving Bell and the Butterfly (Le scaphandre et le papillon) • France
- The Douglas Edwards Experimental/Independent Film/Video Award:
  - Pedro Costa – Colossal Youth (Juventude em Marcha)
- New Generation Award:
  - Sarah Polley – Away from Her
- Legacy Film Award:
  - Milestone Film and Video
  - The Outfest Legacy Project
- Career Achievement Award:
  - Sidney Lumet
- Special Citation:
  - The New Crowned Hope series commissioned by director Peter Sellars to honor the anniversary of Mozart's 250th birthday
