= Teodor Corban =

Romanian actor (1957–2023)

- Born: 28 April 1957; Iași, Romania
- Died: 17 January 2023 (aged 65); Bucharest, Romania
- Burial place: Vlădiceni Monastery
- Occupation: Actor
- Years active: 1985–2023

Teodor Corban (Romanian pronunciation: [teˈodor ˈkorban]; 28 April 1957 – 17 January 2023) was a Romanian actor.

== Filmography ==
- One Floor Below (2015) - Pătrașcu
- Aferim! (2015) - Constantin
- A Very Unsettled Summer (2013) - The Boss (as Teo Corban)
- Child's Pose (2013) - Mr. Şerban
- Beyond the Hills (2012) - Police inspector
- From Now On (Short) (2012) - Constantin
- Bora Bora (Short) (2011) - Inspector
- Francesca (2009) - Ion
- Portrait of the Fighter as a Young Man (2010) - Teodor
- Tales from the Golden Age (2009) - The Mayor (segment "The Legend of the Official Visit")
- The Yellow Smiley Face (2008) - Florin Popescu
- 4 Months, 3 Weeks and 2 Days (2007) - Unirea Hotel receptionist (as Teo Corban)
- Inimă de țigan (2007) - Stelică
- California Dreamin' (2007) - Secretary of State
- 12:08 East of Bucharest (Romanian title:A fost sau n-a fost?) (2006) - Virgil Jderescu
- Lombarzilor 8 (TV Series) (2006) - Vasile
- A Trip to the City (Short) (2003) - The Mayor

== Awards ==
Corban won a Gopo award for "Best actor in a leading role" in the 2015 film Aferim!.
