= Tatiana Niculescu =

Romanian writer and editor

Tatiana Niculescu (former name Tatiana Niculescu Bran) is a Romanian writer and former senior editor of the Bucharest Bureau of the BBC WS. She previously worked for almost 10 years as a radio presenter and producer of the World Service in London. Her non fiction novel Deadly Confession (Spovedanie la Tanacu) was published in 2006 by Humanitas Publishing House. It was followed by Judges’ Book (Cartea Judecatorilor). A second edition and e-book of Deadly Confession were issued by Polirom Publishing House in 2012. The novels caused a sensation in her native country and inspired the film director Cristian Mungiu who produced and directed the film Beyond the Hills based on the same novels. The film won the award for the best screenplay at the 2012 Cannes Film Festival. In 2007 a stage version of the books directed by the American-Romanian director Andrei Serban had been performed at La MaMa Theatre in New York. In 2008, the theatre performance was staged in Paris at the Béhague Palace. Peter Brook and Pascal Bruckner attended the performance.

In 2011, Tatiana Niculescu wrote the political novel The Nights of the Patriarch.

In 2012, Polirom Publishing House published her novel In the Land of God, an African story about the ritual of young girls' genital mutilation. The novel was followed by The story of lady Marina and the unknown Bessarabian and several bestselling biographies published by Humanitas. 2015 -- Regina Maria. Ultima dorința; 2016 -- Mihai I, ultimul rege al românilor; 2017 -- Mistica rugăciunii și a revolverului. Viața lui Corneliu Zelea Codreanu; 2018 -- Ei mă consideră făcător de minuni. Viața lui Arsenie Boca; 2019 -- Regele și Duduia. Carol II și Elena Lupescu dincolo de bârfe și clișee; 2020 -- Seducătorul domn Nae. Viața lui Nae Ionescu; 2021 -- Nepovestitele iubiri. 7 minibiografii sentimentale; 2022 - Singur. Viața lui Mihai Sebastian; 2023 - Englezul din Gara de Nord. După o poveste adevărată (roman)
