= Adi Carauleanu =

Romanian actor

- Born: 8 March 1957 (age 69); Calafat, Romania
- Education: Caragiale National University of Theatre and Film
- Occupations: Actor; Artistic director

Adi Carauleanu (born 8 March 1957) is a Romanian actor known for his roles in The Paper Will Be Blue (2006) and Cristian Mungiu's Palme d'Or-winning 2007 film 4 Months, 3 Weeks and 2 Days.

Born in Calafat, Dolj County, Carauleanu completed his studies at the Institute of Theatre and Cinema Art in Bucharest in 1981. From 1996 to 2015, he served as the artistic director at Iași National Theatre.
