= 2007 National Society of Film Critics Awards =

Annual US film awards ceremony

42nd NSFC Awards

January 5, 2008

Best Film:
There Will Be Blood

The 42nd National Society of Film Critics Awards, given on 5 January 2008, honored the best in film for 2007.

== Winners ==
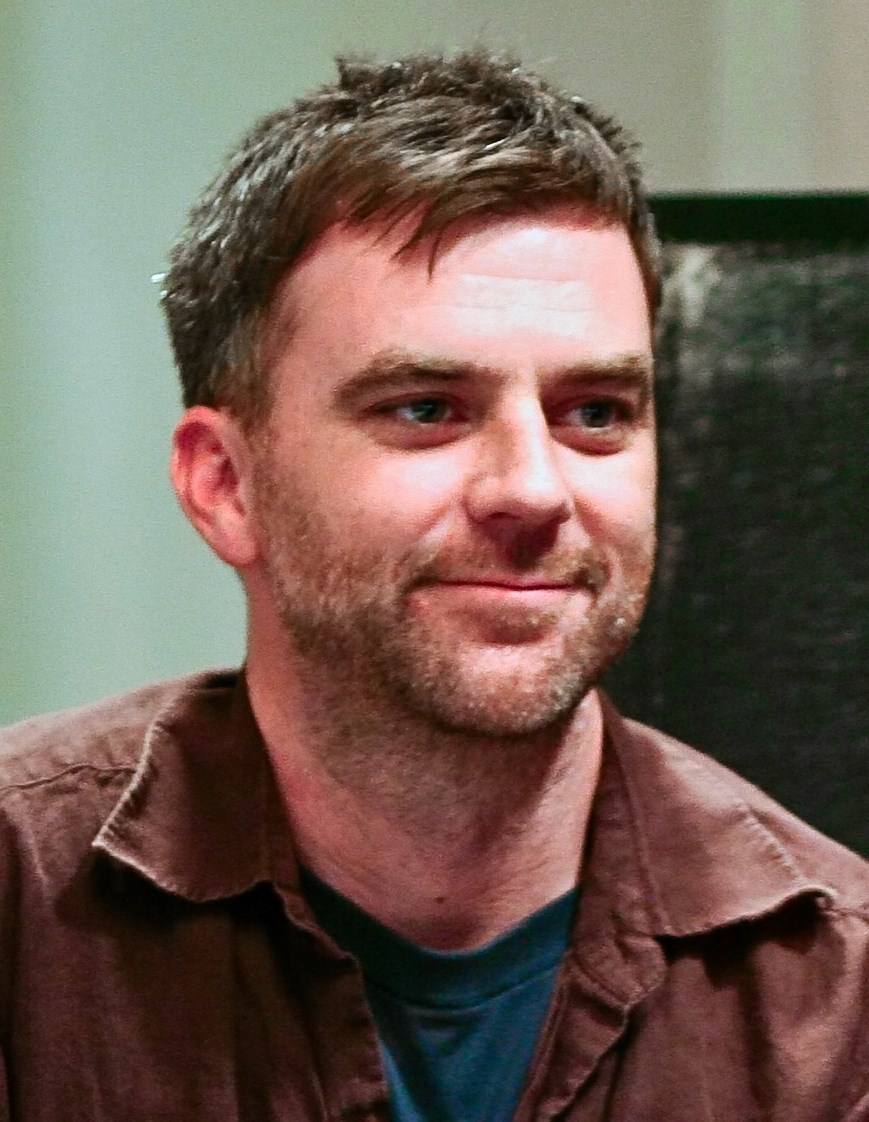
Paul Thomas Anderson, Best Director winner

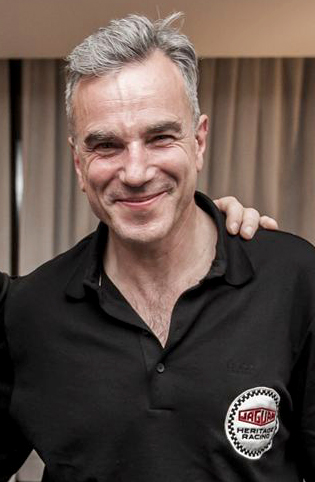
Daniel Day-Lewis, Best Actor winner

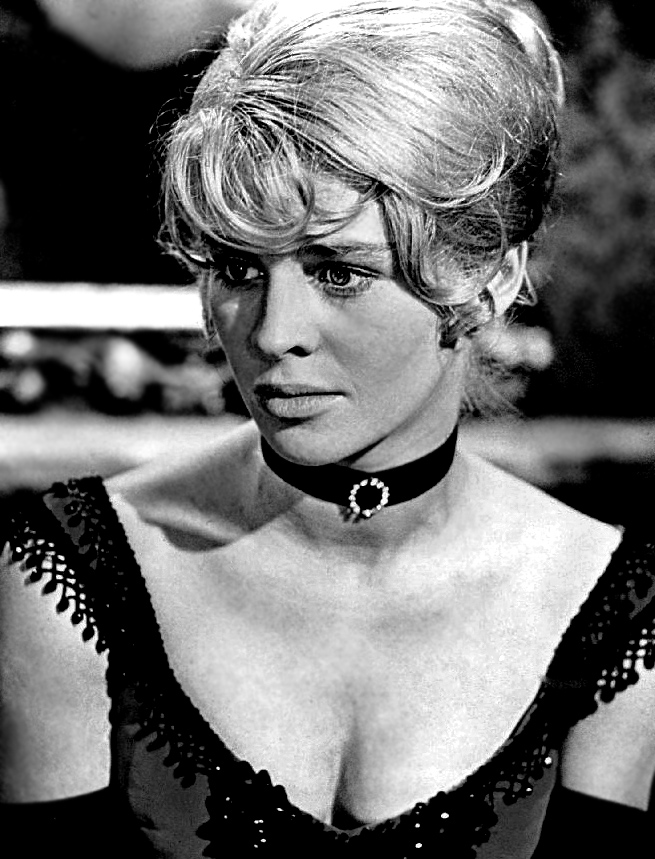
Julie Christie, Best Actress winner

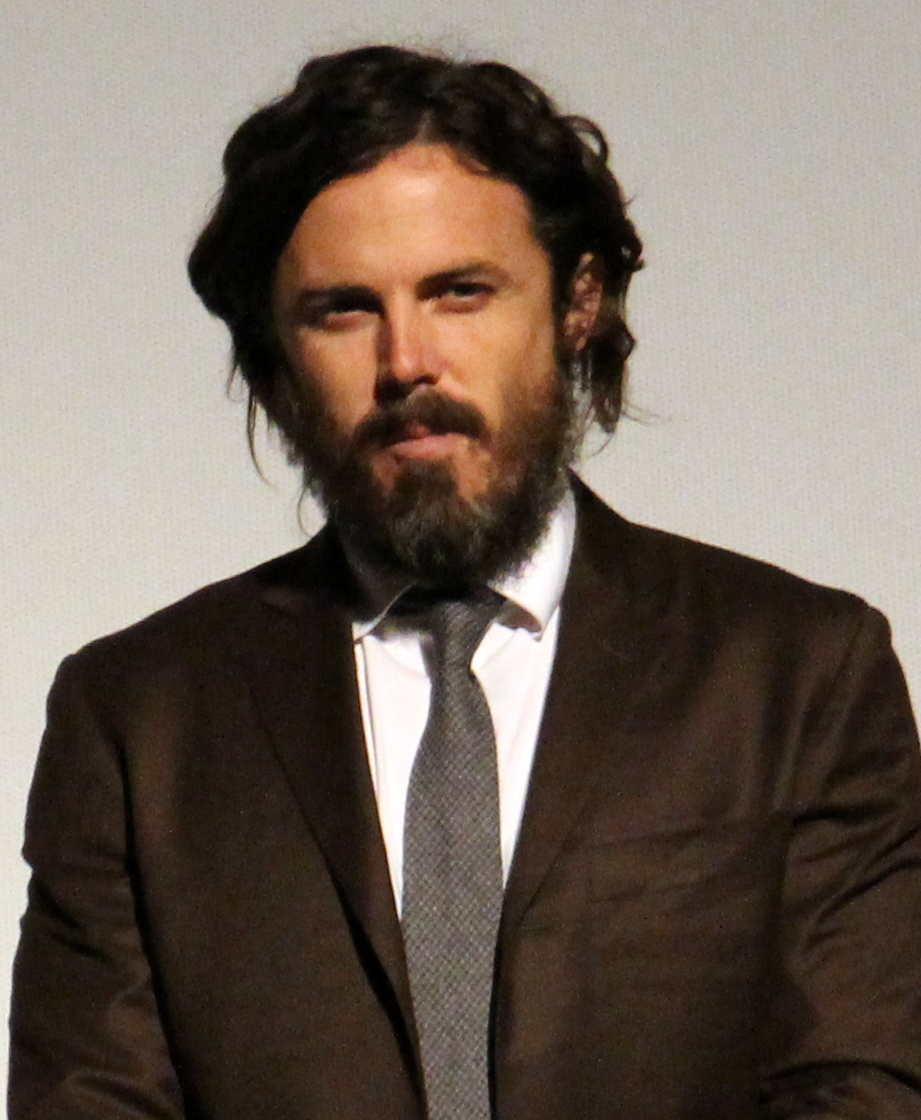
Casey Affleck, Best Supporting Actor winner

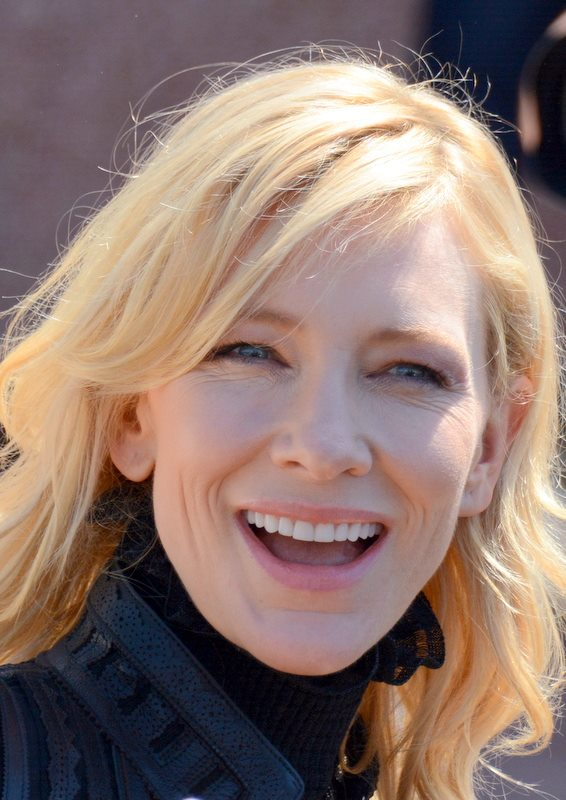
Cate Blanchett, Best Supporting Actress winner

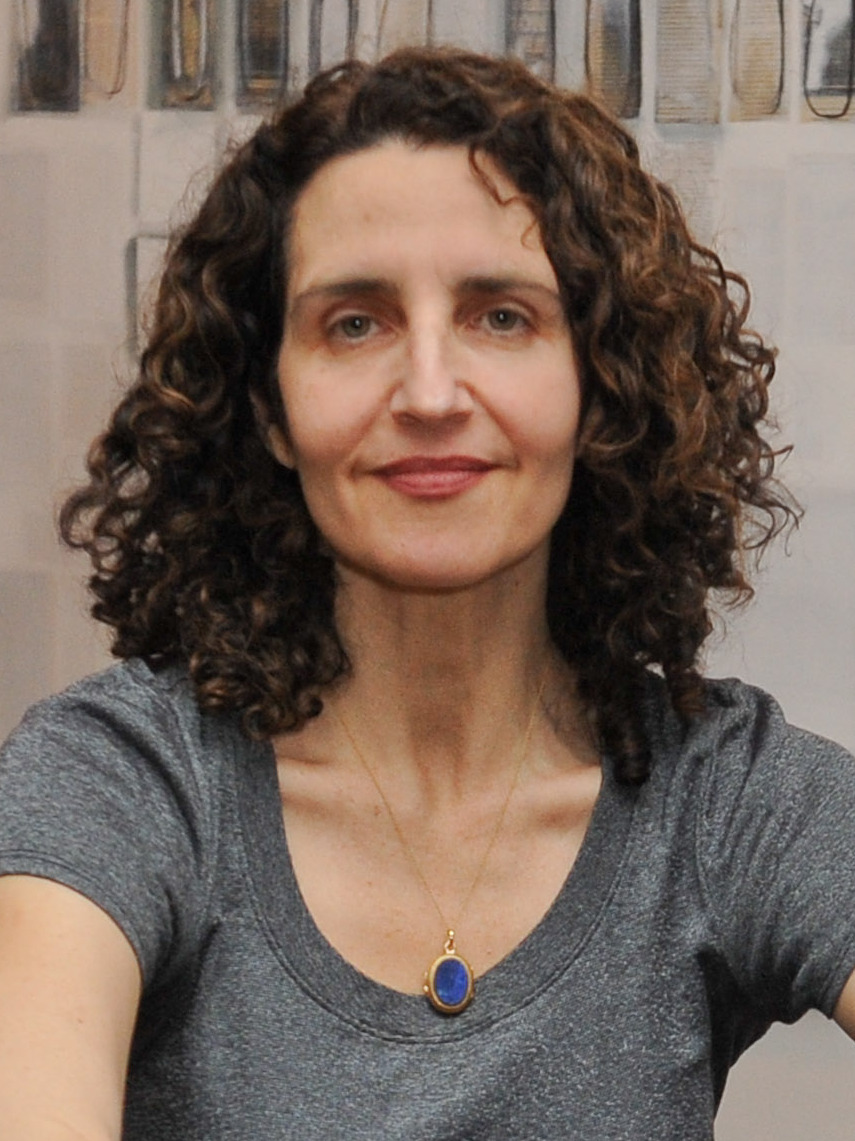
Tamara Jenkins, Best Screenplay winner

=== Best Picture ===
1. There Will Be Blood
2. The Diving Bell and the Butterfly (Le scaphandre et le papillon)
3. No Country for Old Men

=== Best Director ===
1. Paul Thomas Anderson – There Will Be Blood
2. Joel Coen and Ethan Coen – No Country for Old Men
2. Julian Schnabel – The Diving Bell and the Butterfly (Le scaphandre et le papillon)

=== Best Actor ===
1. Daniel Day-Lewis – There Will Be Blood
2. Frank Langella – Starting Out in the Evening
3. Philip Seymour Hoffman – Before the Devil Knows You're Dead and The Savages

=== Best Actress ===
1. Julie Christie – Away from Her
2. Marion Cotillard – La Vie en Rose (La Môme)
3. Anamaria Marinca – 4 Months, 3 Weeks and 2 Days (4 luni, 3 săptămâni și 2 zile)

=== Best Supporting Actor ===
1. Casey Affleck – The Assassination of Jesse James by the Coward Robert Ford
2. Javier Bardem – No Country for Old Men
3. Philip Seymour Hoffman – Charlie Wilson's War

=== Best Supporting Actress ===
1. Cate Blanchett – I'm Not There
2. Amy Ryan – Gone Baby Gone and Before the Devil Knows You're Dead
3. Tilda Swinton – Michael Clayton

=== Best Screenplay ===
1. Tamara Jenkins – The Savages
2. Paul Thomas Anderson – There Will Be Blood
3. Ronald Harwood – The Diving Bell and the Butterfly (Le scaphandre et le papillon)

=== Best Cinematography ===
1. Robert Elswit – There Will Be Blood
2. Janusz Kamiński – The Diving Bell and the Butterfly (Le scaphandre et le papillon)
3. Roger Deakins – No Country for Old Men

=== Best Foreign Language Film ===
1. 4 Months, 3 Weeks and 2 Days (4 luni, 3 săptămâni și 2 zile)
2. The Diving Bell and the Butterfly (Le scaphandre et le papillon)
3. Persepolis

=== Best Non-Fiction Film ===
1. No End in Sight
2. Sicko
3. Terror's Advocate (L'avocat de la terreur)

=== Best Experimental Film ===
- Profit Motive and the Whispering Wind

=== Film Heritage Awards ===
1. "Ford at Fox", a 21-disc box set from Fox Home Video.
2. Ross Lipman of the UCLA Film and Television Archive for the restoration of Charles Burnett's Killer of Sheep (1978) and other independent films.
