= Graduation (2016 film) =

Film by Cristian Mungiu

- British theatrical release poster
- Directed by: Cristian Mungiu
- Written by: Cristian Mungiu
- Produced by: Cristian Mungiu
- Starring: Adrian Titieni; Maria-Victoria Dragus; Lia Bugnar; Mălina Manovici; Vlad Ivanov
- Cinematography: Tudor Vladimir Panduru
- Edited by: Mircea Olteanu
- Production companies: Mobra Films; Why Not Productions; Les Films du Fleuve; France 3 Cinéma
- Distributed by: Voodoo Films
- Release date: 19 May 2016 (Cannes)
- Running time: 128 minutes
- Countries: Romania; France; Belgium
- Language: Romanian
- Box office: $1.9 million

Graduation (Romanian: Bacalaureat) is a 2016 tragedy drama film produced, written, and directed by Cristian Mungiu. Set in Transylvania, it stars Adrian Titieni as Romeo, a doctor on a quest to fix his daughter's (Maria-Victoria Dragus) exam results by underhanded means.

The film had its world premiere at the main competition of the 2016 Cannes Film Festival on 19 May, where it won the Best Director award.

== Plot ==
Romeo is a middle-aged doctor employed at a local hospital in the Romanian region of Transylvania. He lives with his wife, Magda, and their 18-year-old daughter, Eliza, who has got a scholarship to the University of Cambridge. She is preparing to sit her final exams and needs to maintain a grade of at least 90% to take up her scholarship. Romeo is a doting father and drives Eliza to school regularly.

Romeo's girlfriend, Sandra, is a teacher at Eliza's school. One day while visiting Sandra he receives a message: Eliza has been assaulted near her school. She has a sprained wrist and is emotionally shaken up but is not seriously injured. She reveals that the assailant tried to rape her but did not succeed.

The next day Eliza must sit for her first examination. The headmaster tries to exclude her because she is wearing a cast on her wrist - notes can be hidden in a cast. Sandra intervenes and the headmaster backs down. The cast slows her writing and time runs out before she is finished - she will need nearly perfect results on the remaining exams to claim her scholarship.

At the police station the chief inspector suggests to Romeo that Eliza's exam results can be fixed in exchange for expediting a liver transplant for a corrupt official, a Mr. Bulai.

That evening Romeo discusses the plan with Magda and she immediately rejects it - she fears the corruption in Romania will affect Eliza's fresh start at Cambridge. Romeo argues that the exams are a mere formality, otherwise meaningless. She is unmoved. Romeo presents the plan to Eliza and implores her to accept a little help now to ensure a brighter future. She listens to him but doesn't make any committed responses, and Romeo tells her to do what she thinks is best before he leaves to let her rest.

The next day Romeo goes to the police station to see the CCTV from Eliza's attack. As he waits at the school for Eliza to complete her second exam, he speaks to her boyfriend, Marius. Romeo listens to what Marius has to say about what happened on the morning of the attack and is put off by Marius' aloofness of the whole incident. Because he was late, Eliza was left on her own. He also assumed Eliza went off to class and did not seek her out. Eliza and Marius go off together on his motorbike.

Eliza comes to fetch Romeo from Sandra's place after Romeo's mother collapses. No longer able to ignore the affair, Eliza threatens to skip her exams if he doesn't tell Magda about it immediately. She wonders aloud whether her other grades were also "fixed". At home that evening Magda and Romeo talk. Magda already knew about Sandra and will try to get Eliza to take her last exam, but she also asks Romeo to move out.

The next day Romeo arrives for work at the hospital and is confronted by a pair of prosecutors. They want to interview Romeo's patient, Mr. Bulai, about corruption allegations against him. Romeo resists because Bulai is waiting for an operation and is quite unwell. The prosecutors caution Romeo they are aware of the quid-pro-quo arrangement for his daughter's exams - both he and Eliza could be facing charges.

Romeo visits the chief inspector again, who assures him that his daughter's assailant will soon be identified in a police line-up. Later that day he sees Marius and invites him to view the lineup, as he believes he saw Marius witness the attack on the CCTV footage. Marius refuses, saying he did not witness the attack, that it is not him in CCTV picture. Romeo accuses him of cowardice for not intervening, and for only calling the cops much later after witnessing the assault. Romeo orders Marius to stay away from Eliza, and Marius pushes him to the ground and leaves. Romeo visits the headmaster at home to warn him the prosecutors know of the plan. The headmaster tells him that he couldn't find Eliza's paper, and that he shouldn't come to his house again.

That evening at the police station Eliza fails to identify her attacker from a line-up. Later, Romeo is on a bus and sees one of the men from the line-up outside. He leaves the bus and follows him, but gets lost in a bad area. He ends up at Sandra's place and agrees to babysit her son the next morning.

The next day Mr. Bulai has died of a heart attack. The prosecutors are waiting and assure Romeo that the investigation into Mr. Bulai's crimes will continue. Romeo asks the prosecutors to come next Monday and he will co-operate with them for any of their questions. Romeo gets Sandra's son Matei into a speech therapy program. Romeo sees Eliza at her graduation and she tells him that she may not go to England. Romeo responds that it would be a shame but it's her decision. Eliza then says that the teachers gave her extra time to complete her exam, so she did not need to follow Romeo's plan for fixing her paper. She asks Romeo to take a photo of her with her graduating class.

== Cast ==
- Adrian Titieni as Romeo Aldea, a 49 year old physician
- Maria Drăguș as Eliza Aldea, an 18-year-old high school student planning to study psychology abroad in the United Kingdom after graduating
- Lia Bugnar as Magda
- Mălina Manovici as Sandra
- Vlad Ivanov as Chief Inspector
- Gelu Colceag as Exam committee president
- Rareș Andrici as Marius

== Production ==
According to Cristian Mungiu, the film was inspired by his own life at the time, while he was focusing on being a father. The film was produced through the director's company Mobra Films and co-produced with Why Not Productions, Wild Bunch, Les Films du Fleuve, France 3 Cinéma and Mandragora Movies. It received 1.91 million leu from the National Film Center. It was shot in the town Victoria from 11 June to 24 July 2015.

== Release ==
=== Critical reception ===
On Rotten Tomatoes, Graduation has a rating of 95%, based on 138 critics, with an average rating of 8.2/10. The website's critical consensus reads, "Graduation marks yet another well-written and powerfully acted look at morality and societal decay from writer-director Cristian Mungiu." On Metacritic, Graduation holds a score of 84/100, based on 30 critics, indicating "universal acclaim".

Peter Bradshaw of The Guardian lauded it as an "intricate, deeply intelligent film".

=== Accolades ===
Graduation was selected to compete for the Palme d'Or at the 2016 Cannes Film Festival. At Cannes, Mungiu shared the Best Director Award with Olivier Assayas for his film Personal Shopper. At the 8th Magritte Awards, it received a nomination in the category of Best Foreign Film in Coproduction.
