= Hanno Höfer =

Romanian movie director, producer and musician

Hanno Höfer (born 8 July 1967 in Timișoara, Romania) is a Romanian movie director, producer, and musician.

== Early life and education ==
Höfer was born in Timișoara and is of German-Romanian descent. When he was about one year old, he moved to Bucharest due to his parents' work (his father was a journalist and his mother worked first for a newspaper and later in television), but when their home was damaged in the 1977 earthquake, he returned to the Banat region where he stayed for 4 years at his grandparents' home. Then he went back to Bucharest to attend the German Lyceum. After graduation, he failed the university entrance examination to study foreign languages in Bucharest, so he worked for a while as a translator in Bucharest and then as an actor at the German Theater in Timișoara. In 1988, he emigrated with his family to Germany.

Between 1990 and 1992 he studied South-Eastern European History and Ethnology in Berlin, then he had a scholarship at the Babeș-Bolyai University in Cluj, and later, between 1994 and 1998, he studied Movies and Directing at the Academy for Theatre and Film in Bucharest. Here he met Cristian Mungiu, with whom later (and with the cameraman Oleg Mutu) he established the production company "Mobra Films".

== Career ==
He directed a few short movies amongst which Telefon în Străinătate (International Phone Call), Dincolo (on the other side) and Ajutoare umanitare (Humanitarian Aid). Those brought him 3 prizes, at the Munich International Festival of Film Schools, at the Bucharest's CineMAiubit Festival and the grand prize of the Cottbus Film Festival of East European Cinema.

Currently he works together with Cristian Mungiu on the cinematographic trilogy Amintiri din epoca de aur.

== Music projects ==
In his musical career Höfer is a member of Nightlosers, a Romanian rhythm and blues band, where he plays guitar, harmonica, washboard and vocals. He also plays in the Orient Express band of the jazz player Harry Tavitian.

== Prizes won ==
- Grand Prize of the CineMAiubit - International Student Film Festival in Bucharest (1998) for the Telefon în Străinătate (International Phone Call) movie
- CILECT Director's Award at the Munich International Festival of Film Schools (1998) for the Telefon în Străinătate (International Phone Call) movie
- Grand Prize of the Cottbus Film Festival of East European Cinema for the Ajutoare umanitare (Humanitarian Aid) movie

== Filmography ==
=== Director ===
- Telefon în strainatate (1998)
- Dincolo (1999)
- Ajutoare umanitare (2002)
- Amintiri din epoca de aur (2009)

=== Writer ===
- Telefon în strainatate (1998)
- Dincolo (1999)

=== Producer ===
- Lost and Found (2005/I) episode "Turkey Girl"

=== Actor ===
- Zapping (2000) (the husband)

=== Music composer ===
- Dincolo (1999)
- Nici o întâmplare (2000)
- Amintiri din epoca de aur (2009)

== References and sources ==
Sources

- Hanno Höfer at IMDb
- (in German) Short biography of Hanno Höfer
- (in German) Kino-zeit (German magazine) article about the Amintiri din epoca de aur movie trilogy
- (in Romanian) Hanno Hofer: "Mi-ar parea rau daca ar trebui sa plec acum in Germania"
- (in Romanian) Hanno Höfer: „Cînd au deschis Zidul Berlinului, unul își hăcuia Trabant-ul cu toporul“
- (in Romanian) INTERVIU Hanno Höfer: Admis la Regie de Film în pantaloni scurţi
