= Oleg Mutu =

Romanian cinematographer and film producer (born 1972)

- Born: 22 July 1972 (age 52); Chișinău, Moldavian SSR, Soviet Union
- Occupation(s): Cinematographer; Film producer

Oleg Mutu (born 22 July 1972) is a Romanian cinematographer and film producer. He was born in Chișinău, then part of the Moldavian Soviet Socialist Republic.

With director Cristian Mungiu, Mutu developed a formula of lengthy takes and medium shots with the director's first feature film, Occident (2002). Mutu later produced and directed photography for Mungiu's 2007 Palme d'Or-winning film 4 Months, 3 Weeks and 2 Days. Mutu opted for a minimalist approach, lighting the backgrounds while attempting not to distract from the characters too much. Mutu also set up lights from building roofs for the final scenes, employing a rod and paper lanterns for the camera. For the film, he shared the European Film Award for Best Film, the first time a Romanian work won the honour. At Romania's national Gopo Awards, he shared the award for Best Feature Film and won Best Cinematography.

== Filmography ==
His films include:

- The Death of Mr. Lazarescu (2005)
- What Means Motley? (2006)
- 4 Months, 3 Weeks and 2 Days (2007)
- Tales from the Golden Age (2009)
- My Joy (2010)
- Innocent Saturday (2011)
- Beyond the Hills (2012)
- In the Fog (2012)
- In Bloom (2013)
- The Unsaved (2013)
- With Mum (2013)
- My Good Hans (2015)
- Orizont (2015)
- Together for Ever (2015)
- Summer's Over (2016)
- United States of Love (2016)
- A Gentle Creature (2017)
- Perfect Health (2017)
- Donbass (2018)
- Love 2. America (2018)
- Miracle (2021)
