= Dana Bunescu =

Romanian film editor and sound editor

- Born: 11 September 1969 (age 56); Craiova, Romania
- Education: University of Bucharest
- Occupation: Film editor
- Awards: Silver Bear

Dana Bunescu (born 11 September 1969) is a Romanian film editor and sound editor. She is known for editing Cristian Mungiu's films 4 Months, 3 Weeks and 2 Days (2007) and Tales from the Golden Age (2009), which screened at the Cannes Film Festival.

Born in Craiova, she attended the University of Bucharest and studied physics, graduating in 1993. For 4 Months, 3 Weeks and 2 Days, Bunescu was nominated for the Gopo Award for Best Editing. For Călin Peter Netzer's film Ana, mon amour, Bunescu received the Silver Bear for technical achievement at the 2017 Berlin International Film Festival.
