= Miracle (2021 film) =

2021 film

- Directed by: Bogdan George Apetri
- Screenplay by: Bogdan George Apetri
- Produced by: Bogdan George Apetri; Oana Iancu
- Cinematography: Oleg Mutu
- Edited by: Bogdan George Apetri
- Production companies: The East Company Productions; Cineart TV; Tasse Film
- Release date: 2021
- Running time: 118 minutes
- Countries: Romania; Czech Republic; Latvia
- Language: Romanian

Miracle (Romanian: Miracol) is a 2021 crime drama film written, co-produced, edited and directed by Bogdan George Apetri. The film premiered at the 78th Venice International Film Festival, in the Horizons competition. It was awarded best film at the 2021 Warsaw Film Festival, and won the Don Quixote Award at the 2022 Tromsø International Film Festival.

== Cast ==
- Ioana Bugarin as Cristina Tofan
- Emanuel Pârvu as Marius Preda
- Cezar Antal as Batin

== Reception ==
On the review aggregator website Rotten Tomatoes, 100% of 24 critics' reviews are positive, with an average rating of 7.60/10.

== See also ==
- List of films with a 100% rating on Rotten Tomatoes
