= Ana, mon amour =

2017 film

- Film poster
- Directed by: Călin Peter Netzer
- Written by: Călin Peter Netzer; Cezar Paul-Bădescu; Iulia Lumânare
- Produced by: Călin Peter Netzer; Oana Iancu
- Starring: Mircea Postelnicu
- Cinematography: Andrei Butica
- Edited by: Dana Bunescu
- Distributed by: Freeman Entertainment (Romania); Beta Cinema
- Release dates: 17 February 2017 (Berlin); 3 March 2017 (Romania)
- Running time: 127 minutes
- Country: Romania
- Language: Romanian

Ana, mon amour is a 2017 Romanian drama film directed by Călin Peter Netzer. It was selected to compete for the Golden Bear in the main competition of the 67th Berlin International Film Festival. Editor Dana Bunescu received the Silver Bear for Outstanding Artistic Contribution.

== Plot ==
Ana (Diana Cavallioti) and Toma (Mircea Postelnicu) are in a heated debate over Friedrich Nietzsche's philosophy. As the argument continues they both end up in bed and have sex. Later it is revealed that Ana has anxiety attacks that border on mental illness.

== Cast ==
- Mircea Postelnicu as Toma
- Diana Cavallioti as Ana
- Carmen Tănase as Toma's mother
- Vasile Muraru as Toma's father
- Adrian Titieni as Psychologist
- Tania Popa as Ana's mother
- Vlad Ivanov as Priest Adrian
- Ioana Flora as Irina

== Production ==
The film was a joint production of Parada Film (Romania), Augenschein Filmproduktion (Germany), and Sophie Dulac Productions (France). The casting for the film began in August 2014 with Christina Paul of Germany being in charge of the make-up team while André Rigaut was the sound mixer for the team, along with 2 cameras on board. In October 2014 the film received a grant of 361,000 Euros from the Romanian National Film Center, half of what was needed. The producer (Oana Kelemen) has then made an appeal, and received 2 million Euros in compensation. The film was supposed to begin shooting in summer/fall of 2015 but was delayed till 10 March 2016. The film was filmed in just 2 months.

Cinematographer Andrei Butica said that they used a prosthesis in the sex scene between Mircea Postelnicu and Diana Cavallioti.

== Reception ==
The film was ranked number 4 in Romanian box offices in 2017. Deborah Young of The Hollywood Reporter praised it for being "A seriously complicated romantic drama". Variety's Jay Weissberg also praised the film but criticized its chronological order and fast play.

The film also got a B− from IndieWire.

On review aggregator website Rotten Tomatoes, the film holds an approval rating of 100% based on 5 reviews, with an average rating of 6.8/10.
