= Vlad Ivanov =

Romanian actor

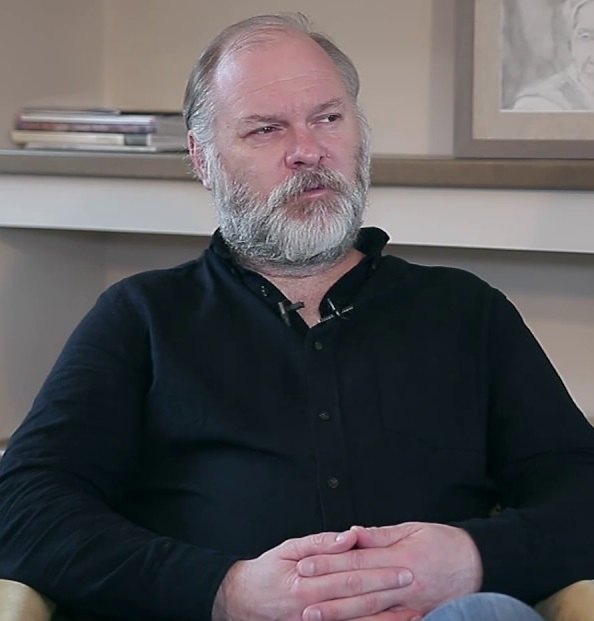
- Born: 4 August 1969 (age 56); Botoșani, SR Romania
- Occupation: Actor
- Years active: 1998–present

Vlad Ivanov (Romanian pronunciation: [ˈvlad iˈvanov]; born Vladimir Ivanov [vladiˈmir iˈvanov], 4 August 1969) is a Romanian actor of Lipovan origin.

== Selected filmography ==
Year	Title	Role	Director	Notes
2006	Second in Command	RSO John Lydon	Simon Fellows	US film
2007	4 Months, 3 Weeks and 2 Days	Mr. Bebe	Cristian Mungiu	Palme d'Or-winning film
2008	Black Sea	Adrian	Federico Bondi	
2009	Tales from the Golden Age	Grigore	Cristian Mungiu (2)	
2009	Police, Adjective	Anghelache	Corneliu Porumboiu	
2009	Le Concert	Pyotr Tretyakin	Radu Mihăileanu	French film, nominated for Golden Globe for Best Foreign Language Film
2010	My Joy	Major from Moscow	Sergei Loznitsa	Ukrainian film
2011	Crulic: The Path to Beyond	Crulic	Anca Damian	Animated film, voice-role
2012	In the Fog	Grossmeier	Sergei Loznitsa (2)	Belarusian film
2013	Snowpiercer	Franco the Elder	Bong Joon-ho	South Korean film
2013	Child's Pose	Dinu Laurențiu	Călin Peter Netzer	Golden Bear-winning film
2016	Graduation	Chief Inspector	Cristian Mungiu (3)	Best Director Award (Cannes Film Festival)-winning film
2016	Toni Erdmann	Iliescu	Maren Ade	German film, Academy Award for Best Foreign Language Film nominee
2016	Dogs	Samir	Bogdan Mirică	FIPRESCI Prize winner at the 2016 Cannes Film Festival
2016	Dark Crimes	Piotr	Alexandros Avranas	US-Polish film
2017	Ana, mon amour	Priest Adria	Călin Peter Netzer (2)	
2017	One Step Behind the Seraphim		Daniel Sandu	
2018	Sunset	Oszkár Brill	László Nemes	Hungarian film
2018	Hier	Victor Ganz	Balint Kenyeres	Hungarian film
2019	The Whistlers	Cristi	Corneliu Porumboiu (2)	nominated for Palme d'Or at the 2019 Cannes Film Festival
2022	Metronom	Biriș	Alexandru Belc	
2026	Only Beautiful Things to Look At		Ivan Ostrochovský	

- Barbie- Princess and the Pauper- King Dominik (Romanian voice)

== Awards ==
- The Los Angeles Film Critics Association Award for Best Supporting Actor (2007)
- The Gopo Award for Best Supporting Actor for the role of Mr. Bebe in 4 Months, 3 Weeks and 2 Days (2008)
- The Gopo Award for Best Supporting Actor for the role of Anghelache in Police, Adjective (2010)
