= Alexandru Papadopol =

Romanian actor

- Born: April 5, 1975 (age 50); Râmnicu Vâlcea, Romania
- Education: Caragiale National University of Theatre and Film
- Occupations: Actor; Producer
- Years active: 2001–present

Alexandru Papadopol (Romanian pronunciation: [alekˈsandru papaˈdopol]; born 5 April 1975) is a Romanian actor.

He was born in Râmnicu Vâlcea and graduated in 1993 from the Ion Neculce National College in Bucharest. In 2002, he earned an acting degree from the Caragiale National University of Theatre and Film in Bucharest, where he studied under the great actor Dem Rădulescu.

Papadopol is an actor at the Odeon Theatre in Bucharest. During his two-decade career, he has had important roles in cinema, TV, and theater.

== Filmography ==
=== Film and miniseries ===
Year	Title	Role	Notes
2023	Încă două lozuri	Pompiliu Borș	Directed by Paul Negoescu
2023	Freedom	Petrache T.	Directed by Tudor Giurgiu
2021	A Higher Law	Father Dragoș Ivanovici	Directed by Octav Chelaru
2020	Tuff Money	Doru	Directed by Daniel Sandu, HBO Europe TV series, 6 episodes
2019	Arrest	Dinu	Directed by Andrei Cohn
2018	The Story of a Summer Lover	Petru	Directed by Paul Negoescu
2016	Two Lottery Tickets	Pompiliu Borș	Directed by Paul Negoescu
2015	Back Home	Robert	Directed by Andrei Cohn
2015	Bucharest Non Stop	Gelu	Directed by Dan Chișu
2014	Alt Love Building	Cristian	Directed by Iulia Rugină
2013	Love Building	Cristian	Directed by Iulia Rugină
2002	Occident	Luci	Directed by Cristian Mungiu, premiered at Directors' Fortnight
2001	Stuff and Dough	Ovidiu	Directed by Cristi Puiu, premiered at Directors' Fortnight

=== TV ===
Year	Title	Role	Notes
2010	Iubire și onoare	Claudiu	Directed by Alex Fotea
2009	Aniela	Aleco	Directed by Iura Luncașu
2008	Regina	Dinu	Directed by Iura Luncașu
2007	Războiul sexelor	Alex	Directed by Peter Kerek
2006	Daria, iubirea mea	Andi	Directed by Alex Fotea
2005	Păcatele Evei	Robert/Mihnea Nicolau	Directed by Adrian Batista
2004	Numai iubirea	Dan	Directed by Iura Luncașu

=== Theatre (at Odeon Theatre) ===
Year	Title	Role	Notes
2023	Neliniște, by Ivan Vyrypaev	Steve Racoon	Directed by Bobi Pricop
2020	Kilometrul Zero, by Saviana Stănescu	Radu	Directed by Andrei Măjeri
2019	Persona, by Ingmar Bergman	Mr. Vogler	Directed by Radu Nica
2019	Delirium, by Enda Walsh, after The Brothers Karamazov by Fyodor Dostoevsky	Ivan	Directed by Vlad Massaci
2018	Fugarii, after Anton Chekhov	Pekarski	Directed by Alexandru Dabija
2016	Soldatul de ciocolată, by George Bernard Shaw	Bluntschli	Directed by Andrei Șerban
2016	Švejk, after Jaroslav Hašek	Lukas, Kotatko, a drunkard	Directed by Alexandru Dabija
2015	Trei generații, by Lucia Demetrius	Ilie	Directed by Dinu Cernescu
2014	Viză de clown, by Saviana Stănescu	Bob	Directed by Alexandru Mihail
2013	Liniște! Sărut. Acțiune!, an adaptation by Peter Kerek after the film Living in Oblivion by Tom Dicillo	Cocaină, director of photography	Directed by Peter Kerek
2013	Titanic Waltz, by Tudor Mușatescu	Stamatescu	Directed by Alexandru Dabija

=== Theatre (other collaborations) ===
Year	Title	Role	Location	Notes
2023	Am făcut ce s-a putut, by Sever Bârzan and Matei Lucaci-Grünberg	Tiberiu Truță	Teatrul Dramaturgilor Români	Directed by Matei Lucaci-Grünberg
2022	Masacrul, by Yasmina Reza	Alexandru	unteatru	Directed by Mihai Brătilă
2022	Rope, by Alfred Hitchcock	Nae Rădulescu	Teatrul Infinite	Directed by Matei Lucaci-Grünberg
2022	Conspiraționiștii - Doi Motani, by Iulian Postelnicu	Laurențiu		Directed by Iulian Postelnicu
2021	Libretto Solitudine, by Matei Lucaci-Grünberg	The actor	Teatrul Infinite	Directed by Matei Lucaci-Grünberg
2021	Libretto Impostura, by Matei Lucaci-Grünberg	Carlos Ribagorda	Teatrul Infinite	Directed by Matei Lucaci-Grünberg
2020	Și timpul s-a oprit în loc, by Donald Margulies	James	Teatrul de Artă	Directed by Bogdan Budeș
2016	O spovedanie, by Dan Chișu	Preotul		Directed by Emanuel Pârvu
2012	Autobahn, by Neil LaBute	El	Teatrul de Comedie, București	Directed by Mihai Brătilă
2002	Pe jos, by Sławomir Mrożek	The father	Studioul Casandra	Directed by George Ivașcu
2002	Curcanul, by Sławomir Mrożek	The director	Studioul Casandra	Directed by George Ivașcu
2002	Audiția, by Alexander Galin	Victor Puhov	Studioul Casandra	Directed by George Ivașcu
2001	Noaptea asasinilor, by José Triana	Lalo	Studioul Casandra	Directed by Alexandru Berceanu
