= Occident (film) =

2002 film by Cristian Mungiu

- 2002 movie poster
- Directed by: Cristian Mungiu
- Written by: Cristian Mungiu
- Starring: Alexandru Papadopol; Anca-Ioana Androne
- Cinematography: Vivi Drăgan Vasile
- Edited by: Niţă Chivulescu
- Music by: Petru Mărgineanu; Ioan Gyuri Pascu
- Production company: Temple Film
- Distributed by: New Films Romania; Pro Video
- Release date: 23 May 2002 (Cannes)
- Running time: 105 minutes
- Country: Romania
- Language: Romanian

Occident is a 2002 Romanian film written and directed by Cristian Mungiu. It stars Alexandru Papadopol as a 29-year-old man named Luci and Anca Androne as his wife Sorina. The film is a tragicomedy about young people who move to the West when they are not financially successful in Romania.

== Cast ==
- Alexandru Papadopol as Luci
- Anca-Ioana Androne as Sorina
- Samuel Tastet as Jérôme
- Tania Popa as Mihaela
- Coca Bloos as Mihaela's mother
- Julieta Strîmbeanu as Granny
- Eugenia Bosânceanu as Aunt Leana
- Ioan Gyuri Pascu as Gică
- Valeriu Andriuţă as Nae
- Nicolongo as Luigi
- Dorel Vișan as The cop
- Gabriel Spahiu as The mute Spaniard
- Michael Beck as The Dutchman
- Jérôme Bounkazi as The Italian
- Tora Vasilescu as The school-mistress

== See also ==
- Romanian New Wave
