= 4 Months, 3 Weeks and 2 Days =

2007 film by Cristian Mungiu

- Theatrical poster
- Romanian: 4 luni, 3 săptămâni și 2 zile
- Directed by: Cristian Mungiu
- Written by: Cristian Mungiu
- Produced by: Cristian Mungiu; Oleg Mutu
- Starring: Adi Cărăuleanu; Luminița Gheorghiu; Mădălina Ghițescu; Vlad Ivanov; Anamaria Marinca; Alexandru Potocean; Laura Vasiliu
- Cinematography: Oleg Mutu
- Edited by: Dana Bunescu
- Distributed by: Mobra Films
- Release dates: 17 May 2007 (Cannes); 14 September 2007
- Running time: 113 minutes
- Country: Romania
- Language: Romanian
- Budget: €600,000
- Box office: $9.8 million

4 Months, 3 Weeks and 2 Days (Romanian: 4 luni, 3 săptămâni și 2 zile) is a 2007 Romanian art film (Note: The film has been classified as an art film, and has also been assessed as drama, thriller, horror, and Hitchcockian suspense.) written and directed by Cristian Mungiu and starring Anamaria Marinca, Laura Vasiliu, and Vlad Ivanov. The film is set in Communist Romania in the final years of the Nicolae Ceaușescu era. It tells the story of two students, roommates in a university dormitory, who try to procure an illegal abortion. Inspired by an anecdote from the period and the general social historic context, it depicts the loyalty of the two friends and the struggles they face.

Mungiu and cinematographer Oleg Mutu shot it in Bucharest and other Romanian locations in 2006. After making its world premiere at Cannes, 4 Months, 3 Weeks and 2 Days made its Romanian debut on 1 June 2007, at the Transilvania International Film Festival. It opened to critical acclaim, and was noted for its minimalism and intense themes.

The film won three awards at the 2007 Cannes Film Festival, including the Palme d'Or. It went on to win numerous honours, including Best Film at the European Film Awards and Romania's national Gopo Awards. 4 Months, 3 Weeks and 2 Days became the subject of some controversy over censorship, the abortion debate, and its exclusion from the 80th Academy Awards, but in 2016 it was ranked No. 15 on the BBC's list of 100 Greatest Films of the 21st Century.

== Plot ==
In 1987, two university students in an unnamed Romanian town, Otilia Mihărtescu and Gabriela "Găbița" Drăguț, are roommates in a dormitory. When Găbița becomes pregnant, the two young women arrange a meeting with Mr. Bebe in a hotel, where he is to perform an illegal abortion. At the college dorm, Găbița and Otilia review the items they need for the day. As Găbița nervously sits and waits, Otilia bargains and buys soap and cigarettes from the dormitory shop. Afterwards, Otilia takes a bus to visit her boyfriend Adi, from whom she borrows money. Adi asks Otilia to visit his family that night, as it is his mother's birthday. Otilia initially declines but relents after Adi becomes upset.

Otilia heads to the Unirea hotel, where Găbița has booked a room, only to be informed by an unfriendly receptionist that there is no reservation under Găbița's last name. Otilia visits another hotel, the Tineretului, and after much begging and haggling, is able to book a room at an expensive rate. After speaking with Găbița on the telephone, Otilia goes to a rendezvous point to meet with Bebe, although he had asked Găbița to meet him personally. Mr. Bebe grows angry upon hearing that Găbița is not at the planned hotel.

At the Tineretului, Bebe discovers that Găbița's claim that her pregnancy was in its second or third month was a lie, and that it has been at least four months. This changes the procedure and also adds the risk of a murder charge. While the two women were certain that they would pay no more than 3,000 lei for the abortion, it slowly becomes clear that Bebe expects both women to have sex with him. Desperate and distressed, Otilia has sex with Bebe, as does Găbița. Bebe then performs the abortion by injecting a probe and an unnamed fluid into Găbița's uterus and leaves Otilia instructions on how to dispose of the fetus when it comes out. Otilia is exasperated by Găbița's lies but continues to help and care for her.

Otilia leaves Găbița at the Tineretului to attend Adi's mother's birthday party. She is still disturbed but stays and has dinner with Adi's mother's friends, who are mostly doctors. They converse about trivial matters while Otilia and Adi remain silent. After Otilia accepts a cigarette in front of Adi's parents, one of the guests starts talking about lost values and respect for elders. Adi and Otilia retreat to his room, where she tells him about Găbița's abortion. They begin debating what would happen if it were Otilia who was pregnant, as Adi is opposed to abortion. After the argument, Otilia calls Găbița from Adi's house. Găbița does not answer, so Otilia decides to return to the hotel.

When Otilia enters the hotel room, Găbița is lying on the bed, and she tells Otilia that the fetus has been expelled and is in the bathroom. Otilia wraps the fetus with some towels and puts it in a bag, while Găbița asks her to bury it. Otilia walks outside, finally climbing to the top of a building, as Mr. Bebe had suggested, and drops the bag in a trash chute. She returns to the Tineretului and finds Găbița sitting in its restaurant. Otilia sits and tells Găbița that they are never going to talk about the episode again. Otilia stares blankly at Găbița.

== Production ==
=== Historical background ===
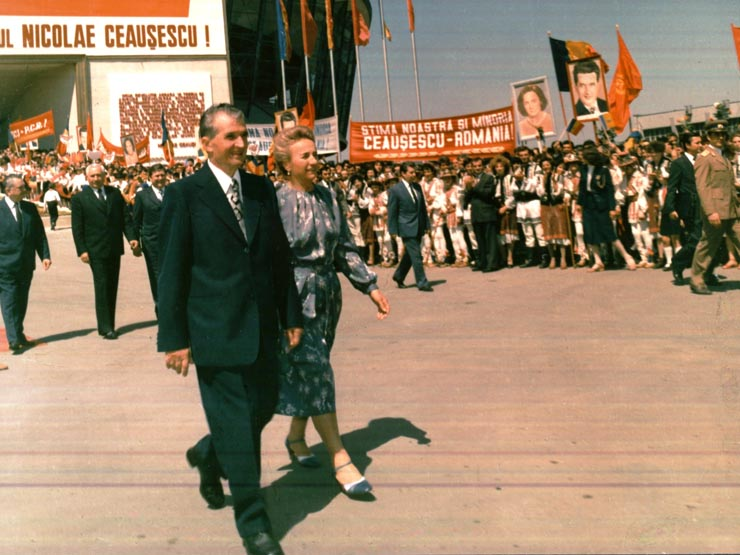
The film is based on Nicolae Ceaușescu's Romania of the 1980s.

Romanian Communist Party General Secretary Nicolae Ceaușescu enacted the abortion law Decree 770 in 1966 in order to increase the birth rates in the country. The procedure was permitted in only extremely limited circumstances. The law was not based on any religious opposition to abortion, but on the government's authority and control over its citizens. Academic Adriana Cordali Gradea further argued justifications for the decree rendered a view of women as second-class citizens, with no right to be heard. In the 1980s, the decree was strengthened to mandate gynecological appointments, to assess if individual women could reproduce. Author Dominique Nasta judged the film to be an accurate portrait of the oppression, and on the poor state of the economy of the Socialist Republic of Romania in the later days of Ceaușescu's regime.

During the years of Decree 770, the only available abortion methods, all illegal, could prove fatal to women, causing thousands of deaths. According to Mungiu's notes he shared with the press, the death toll was 500,000. Gradea cited a conservative 10,000 estimate. Sanctions against contraception were also in place, and sex education was rare. Following the 1989 Revolution, abortion was made lawful, and subsequently unrestricted in the first 14 weeks.

=== Development ===
The initial idea for 4 Months, 3 Weeks and 2 Days was inspired by an anecdote from Communist Romania that director Cristian Mungiu had heard. Though he had heard it from a friend 15 years prior to the film, the incident occurred five years before that, in 1987, a date that Mungiu noted in the screenplay. Mungiu, himself a decrețel (born in the time of Decree 770), wanted to create a serious film focusing on the true story, which still affected him and felt tragic more than 15 years later. He conducted interviews with others who lived through the period, to determine if the experience was common. Aside from the anecdote, depicting the 1980s in Romania was appealing because he remembered the time, and "The attraction is for the stories that I know from that period. They belong to me. They belong to my generation". He hoped that basing the story on a factual account would also distinguish it from previous Romanian films:

I remember watching many propagandistic examples of Romanian cinema and thinking nothing like that ever happened to us. These people were talking the same language but still looked like aliens.

In setting out to write the screenplay, he intended the focus to be less on the abortion, and more on the time and its people. He said, "it's also a film about responsibilities and decision-making". As he continued writing, he stated pushing a political point was not so much a factor in editing, as he opted not to delete potential scenes if they felt credible, asking "Would this reasonably have happened, and does it make sense to the story to keep it?"

Mungiu revised the screenplay numerous times during productions, creating 17 drafts. The major revision was the emergence of Otilia as the sole protagonist, while Găbița's part was reduced. In Mungiu's mind, Otilia had become determined to help Găbița because their shared life in the dormitory over four years would have created an emotional tie between them. The film was produced on a budget of under €600,000.

=== Casting ===
Actor	Role
Anamaria Marinca	Otilia Mihărtescu
Laura Vasiliu	Gabriela 'Găbița' Drăguț
Vlad Ivanov	Mr. Viorel Bebe
Alexandru Potocean	Adi Radu
Luminița Gheorghiu	Gina Radu, Adi's mother
Adi Cărăuleanu	Dr. Radu, Adi's father
Mădălina Ghițescu	Dora

Casting took place during the autumn of 2006. Because of the extended takes, Mungiu sought actors who could remember large amounts of dialogue, and found that Vlad Ivanov was ideal for a 25-minute sequence.

Mungiu viewed auditions of many young women for the two protagonists. Anamaria Marinca had not worked with Mungiu before reading the screenplay, and found the story intriguing. She had performed on television, but had not appeared in a film before. On initially meeting Marinca, the director could not picture her in the lead role, but was won over when she began reading the first page of the screenplay. She had experience on stage, so the lengthy takes were agreeable to her. Laura Vasiliu also had stage experience.

=== Filming ===
Filming began in October 2006, with the objective to complete it by May, so that it could be entered into the 2007 Cannes Film Festival. After location scouting during the fall, most of the filming was done in Bucharest, with some scenes filmed in a hotel in Ploiești. Bucharest in 2006 was no longer how it would have appeared in 1987, due to new windows and other additions to the historic buildings. Production designer Mihaela Poenaru drew on her recollections of the period to prepare the locations. The Mr. Bebe character was also given a red Dacia car. (Note: Mungiu once commented about the period: "the only car you can see on the streets is Dacia".) In several scenes, the indoor locations were so small that the camera had to be placed outside of the room.

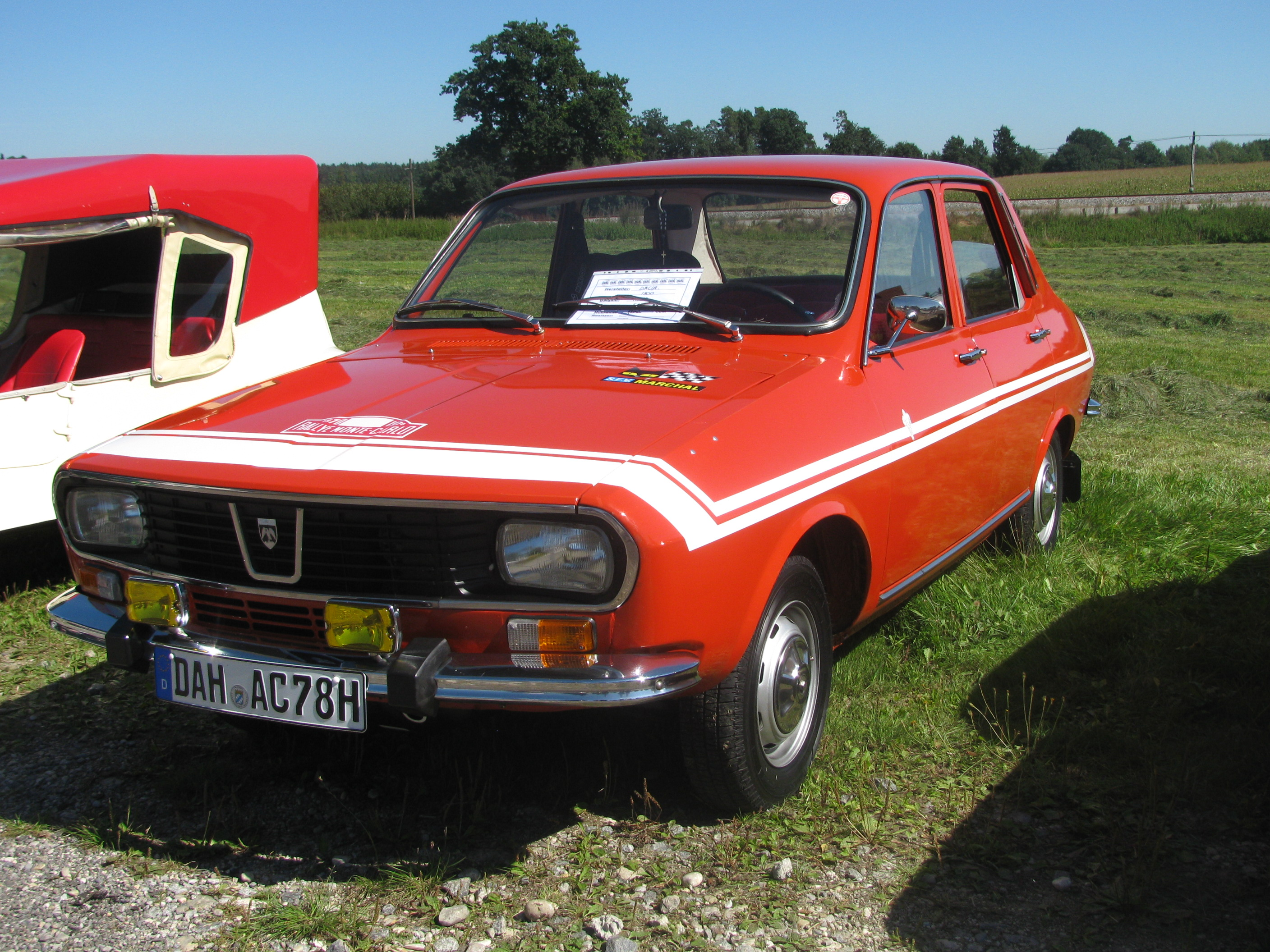
A red Dacia was used in production.

To highlight the emotional state of the characters, the film was shot in long takes, close-ups were avoided, and a score was not used. In Mungiu's mind, this would "keep a proper distance from the subject and be honest with the story". Cinematographer Oleg Mutu opted for a minimalist approach, lighting the backgrounds to display items common in 1987 while attempting not to distract from the characters too much. Mutu and Mungiu had previously developed a formula of lengthy takes and medium shots with the director's first feature film, Occident. With 4 Months, 3 Weeks and 2 Days, Mutu used an Arriflex 535. Mungiu found the dinner scene to be the most difficult to shoot, as including a large number of actors in a long take made it difficult to focus. It took 17 attempts over five days to complete the scene.

In one scene, the aborted fetus is visible on screen for approximately 14 seconds, the length it took for the actors to deliver the dialogue, with Mungiu opting not to edit out the shot since it "was part of the story". The chute featured at the end of the film was constructed for the film, as there was not one at the location. The crew dropped bags of cabbage and potatoes to create the sound effect.

Due to Mungiu saying Romania did not use streetlights in 1987, Mutu considered other ways to light the final scenes, where the camera would move with Marinca for 200 metres. Mutu set up lights from building roofs for this sequence, employing a rod and paper lanterns for the camera. A scene showing Găbița visiting her father (played by Costica Babu) was deleted for narrative purposes, given Otilia is the protagonist.

== Themes and interpretations ==
Academic Judit Pieldner summed up the plot as "the story of a friendship facing a moral test". Scholar Florentina C. Andreescu opined the two female protagonists share emotional loyalty, while in the wake of Mr. Bebe's abuses, Otilia becomes increasingly suspicious of Adi.

Professor László Strausz said that the film emphasises the ways that Romania's abortion laws inflicted humiliations on the protagonists, particularly between people of differing authority and sex. He argued that class and generational conflicts are presented in the dinner party scene, where the characters have more food than lower classes, discuss social issues such as conscription into the Romanian Armed Forces, and treat Otilia as representative of the "new generation" that does not appreciate what it has been given. Academic Claudiu Turcuș remarked that the dinner scene, where the characters look down on some careers and act as if smoking in front of one's elders is disrespectful, shows how regressive they are. Ovidius University author Ileana Jitaru credited the film for reconstructing "an entire communist class ideology which divided society into 'working class people' and 'intellectuals'". Jitaru specifically cited the dinner scene, where the conversation makes much of the divide between those with university degrees and those with none. The attendees boast about belonging to the middle class, and make denigrating comments about Otilia's rural origins.

The term "communism" is never mentioned, the existence of Decree 770 is only implied, and president Nicolae Ceaușescu is never named. Despite this, communism is a major subject. Andreescu found that in many locations, one power is dominant; in some, the government, while in others, an underground power or heterotopia forms. The hotel room where the abortion is performed becomes a location outside of the government's supervision. Mr. Bebe exploits this, boasts of the worth of his expertise and notes the risk he is taking, in order to extort the women for sex. Turcuș instead interpreted the scene as Mr. Bebe presenting himself as the "new man", sharing the women's legal peril and an openness to sexuality, while in fact being "the communist brute". Jump Cut writer Constantin Parvulescu stated "4 Months, 3 Weeks and 2 Days provides an astute balance of ostalgia and anti-communist memorial". Parvulescu elaborated that the beginning gives a view of place and possessions that could be nostalgic, but these become overruled by crisis in the communist society. Essayist Adriana Cordali Gradea suggested that silence is a theme of the film, and that citizens of communist nations would use silence to endure and resist. This is seen at the end, where Otilia forbids further discussion of the abortion. The lack of a score can also be seen as contributing to a sense of pending danger.

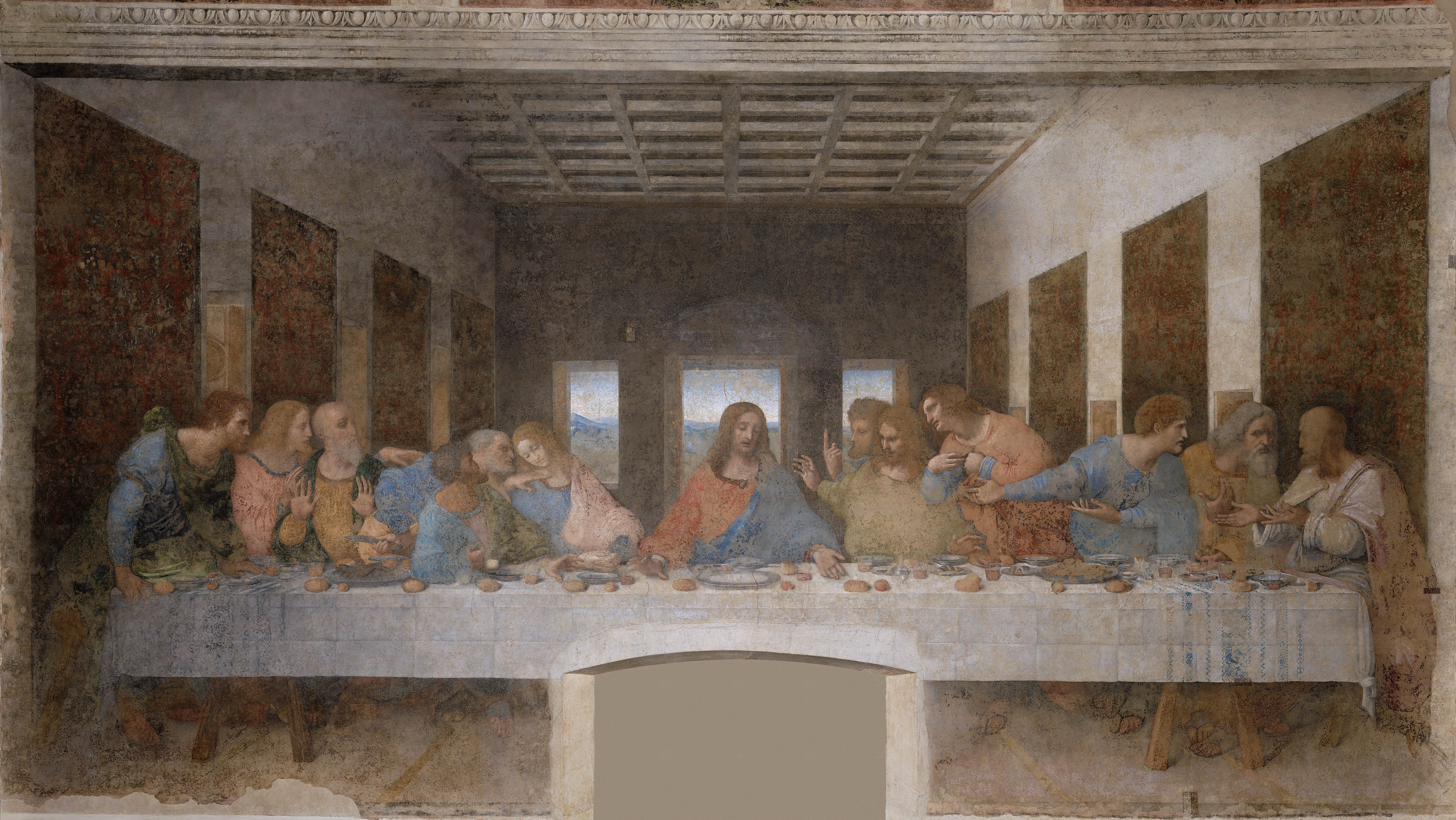
The dinner scene is accidentally reminiscent of the Last Supper.

The fact that the characters live in poverty is reflected in a scene where Mr. Bebe accosts his mother for wanting to buy sugar. When Otilia is searching for Mr. Bebe, there is also a line of people visible in the background queuing for food, reflecting the lack of food security in the 1980s. Additionally, the characters are often impolite towards each other. Mungiu explained that this was related to the poverty, saying "You need people in a society to have reached a certain standard of living before they can be polite". The bartering scenes reflect how corporate goods common west of the Iron Curtain were prohibited in Romania and were viewed as luxuries.

The dinner scene is reminiscent of the Last Supper. Author Doru Pop acknowledged the differing number of characters and no male Jesus, but asserted that it is relevant to have a dinner while a tragedy is unfolding. Mungiu conceded that such similarities were accidental, and that once he appreciated the potential analogy during production, the filmmakers added a more focused view of Otilia to reveal her stress.

== Style ==
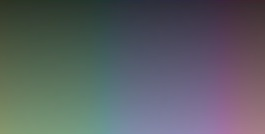
An Empire critic positively reviewed the colour scheme, which academic Ileana Jitaru identified as including desaturated greys, blues and greens.

Scholar Dominique Nasta saw the style as a "minimalist, 'less is more' line". British Film Institute writer Ben Walters judged it "simple and rigorous, with scenes composed of only one or two shots". Walters remarked on "handheld, mobile, almost literally breathtaking" shots, and on the impact of still scenes. Despite the handheld camera, Mungiu said the crew developed a style where shots were taken so the action is followed but the camera's movements would not be overly obvious to the audience. Journalist Brian Gibson assessed the photography as "patient, alert, dogged in its observation of Otilia's endeavours". Surveying the photography, academic Ileana Jitaru found "simple, austere and realistic compositions in which the black humour is a stylistic means of anchoring the theme(s)". Jitaru also commented on the colour scheme, observing "cold desaturated colours", particularly greys, blues and greens in the beginning. Additionally, the story, set during a single day, is related by real time narrative in its scenes, although minutes or hours may separate the events in separate scenes. According to Mungiu, the real time was meant to achieve a sense of continuity true to life.

The Guardian's Peter Bradshaw interpreted the style as "a nightmare of social-realist suspense". The Independent critic Jonathan Romney characterised it as "claustrophobic" in parts and an "intense realist exercise". Despite this, he also believed that the hotel scenes communicate "a sense of almost supernatural horror", and asks of the noise heard after Mr Bebe chastises his mother: "A backfire? A gunshot? Who can tell? But it lends the scene its bizarre, oppressive air of ill omen". Critic Peter Debruge declared the style "the antithesis of your well-lit, elegantly shot Hollywood movies – or the locally made films of Mungiu's childhood".

Journalist Steven Boone said that while the film was well reviewed for "its bracing drabness, its ugliness, its lack of style", he believed it was "beautiful and stylized", because "it is alive and piercingly present-tense". He compared it with the films of the Dardenne brothers. Mungiu said he aimed to begin scenes, including the first, without giving the audience background information and letting viewers discern what was happening. Journalist Lauren Wissot judged the story "a suspense thriller", comparable to the work of Alfred Hitchcock. She felt "heat" in each frame, writing "we're waiting for the bomb— the constant threat of imprisonment or death that defined life under Nicolae Ceaucescu". Aside from reflecting the length of the fictional pregnancy, the 4-3-2 form of the title creates the impression of rushed countdown reinforcing the thriller genre aspects, Gradea wrote.

Responding to analogies to the Dardennes' style, Mungiu said in 2008 that he had only seen their La Promesse (1996) but was now interested in seeing more, and that he had asked the brothers to attend a showing of his film. Mungiu compared his style more to those of Miloš Forman and Jiří Menzel, though he said he was influenced more by certain films than by a director's general filmography.

== Release ==
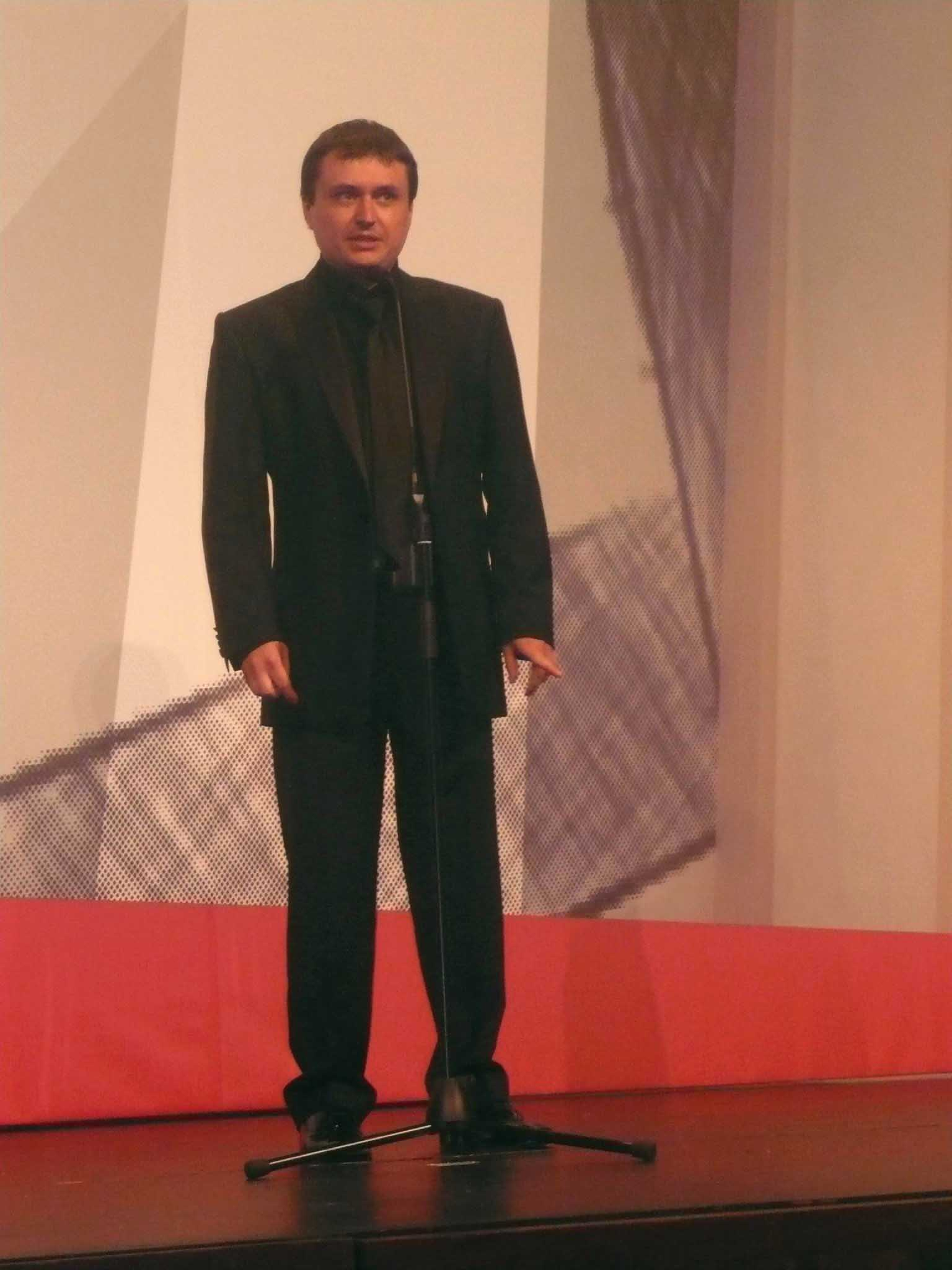
Director Cristian Mungiu at the 2007 San Sebastián International Film Festival.

The film debuted on the first day of the Cannes Film Festival in May 2007. At Cannes, IFC Films purchased distribution rights for the United States. After the festival, distribution rights for 60 countries had been sold. In September 2007, it competed at the San Sebastián International Film Festival. That month, it also screened at the 2007 Toronto International Film Festival.

In its own country, it debuted at the Transilvania International Film Festival in June 2007, where it attracted long queues. With only 50 theatres in Romania, and the lowest rates of theatre attendance in the European Union, a crew on a caravan toured 15 towns without theatres over 30 days for screenings that year. At Transylvania, Mungiu was happy to see that Romanian viewers could comprehend the dark comedy. Filmmaker Sorin Avram documented the caravan tour through Focșani, Petroșani, Călărași and other communities, and interviewed some of the audience of 17,584 people, who described it as shocking and disturbing. (Note: Avram reported on 15 towns, with the most viewers in Constanța (1,982), followed by Bârlad (1,937) and Drobeta-Turnu Severin (1,747) and the fewest in Satu Mare, (381), Călărași (593), and Reșița (814).)

Although the film won the Cinema Prize of the French National Education System at Cannes, protests by the anti-abortion movement led French Education Minister Xavier Darcos to consider banning it from French high schools. This raised concerns among French film industry workers about censorship. Consequently, the proposed ban was dropped in July 2007, and an educational DVD using the film was made available for ages 15 and up. Television stations and an airline also wished to censor the fetus shot.

In June 2008, the film was released on DVD in Region 1 by Genius Products in the U.S. and by Mongrel Media in Canada, featuring interviews with the filmmakers and Sorin Avram's documentary 1 Month with 4 Months, 3 Weeks, 2 Days. In Region 2, Artificial Eye published a 2008 DVD with the interviews and Avram's documentary. In Region A, The Criterion Collection released a Blu-ray in 2019.

== Reception ==
=== Box office ===
In 2007 in Romania, there were 89,000 admissions for 4 Months, 3 Weeks and 2 Days, making it the seventh most attended film in the country that year, and the most attended Romanian film. By 11 November 2007, it had over 300,000 admissions in France. By 8 September 2008, IFC Films reported a solid financial performance for 4 Months, 3 Weeks and 2 Days in the U.S., with a gross of $1.2 million.

The film completed its run in May 2008. It made $1,198,208 in the United States and Canada, and $8,642,130 in other countries, for a worldwide total of $9,840,338.

=== Critical response ===
On Rotten Tomatoes, the film has a 96% approval rating based on 145 reviews and an average rating of 8.35/10. The site's critical consensus reads "Featuring gut-wrenching performances from Anamaria Marinca and Laura Vasiliu, 4 Months is a gripping portrayal of life in Communist Romania". The film also holds a 97% rating on Metacritic based on 37 reviews, indicating "universal acclaim"; while numerous critics placed it in their top 10 films of 2007 or 2008. Roger Ebert awarded it four stars, commenting on the stupidity of the character Găbița and contrasting her to the title character of that year's Juno, but hailing the film as "a powerful film and a stark visual accomplishment". Time magazine's Richard and Mary Corliss described it as a "gripping, satisfying film" and particularly noted the use of minimalism and "formal rigor" as defining aesthetic characteristics. Jay Weissberg from Variety magazine said that the film was "pitch perfect and brilliantly acted... a stunning achievement". He added that the film shares a number of characteristics with other productions of the New Romanian Cinema, namely: "long takes, controlled camera and an astonishing ear for natural dialogue". For The New York Times, Manohla Dargis championed the direction, cinematography and lengthy takes.

Peter Bradshaw remarked on the sharpness of Otilia and the apparent naiveté of Găbița, but considered this is how their crisis could have affected them, and praised the film as "a masterpiece of intimate desperation". In Empire, Damon Wise gave it five stars, positively reviewing the cinematography, colour scheme, and the depiction of the black-market terror created when something is outlawed. The Independent's Jonathan Romney named it a "masterpiece", acknowledging the description "Romanian abortion drama" would be off-putting for some viewers but defending it as "harrowing". Writing for Le Monde, Thomas Sotinel called the film excellent and cited Marinca for an intense performance. Jean-Baptiste Morain of Les Inrockuptibles remarked on the film's powerful emotions, and credited Mungiu with managing to do much with little.

Some sources view the film as indicative of a broader renaissance in Romanian cinema in the 2000s, particularly in light of other successful Romanian films. These include Cristi Puiu's The Death of Mr. Lazarescu, which won the Prix un certain regard at the 2005 Cannes Film Festival; Corneliu Porumboiu's 12:08 East of Bucharest, which won the Camera d'Or at the 2006 Cannes Film Festival; and Cristian Nemescu's California Dreamin', which won the Prix un certain regard at the 2007 Cannes Film Festival.

In 2009, The Guardian ranked it seventh in its "Best films of the noughties" list, surveying the past decade. The New York Times critic A.O. Scott also put the film seventh on his best of the decade list. In 2015, The Guardian's Benjamin Lee identified it as his favourite film to win the Palme d'Or, praising it as a success as a modern thriller. Writing in his 2015 Movie Guide, Leonard Maltin rated it three and a half stars, and called it "forceful" with a "matter-of-fact tone". In a 2016 worldwide critics' poll conducted by BBC, it was ranked 15th in the 100 Greatest Films of the 21st Century.

=== Abortion debate ===
On its international release, the film became partially viewed through the lens of the abortion debate, with Emma Wilson writing in Film Quarterly that IMDb user reviews were highlighting this and comparing it to Juno. (Note: Despite perceptions, Juno star Elliot Page said his film was not intended as anti-abortion.) Wilson observed 4 Months, 3 Weeks and 2 Days displayed the aborted fetus, comparable to the U.S. anti-abortion movement's use of such images, but argued the film was closer to pro-choice ideology in its focus on the law's harm to women. Wilson further argued that the true point was the loyalty of the two characters. Mungiu said the fetus shot was not linked to the anti-abortion movement, as Romanians did not commonly use these depictions and the abortion debate was no longer prominent there. Anti-abortion protests comparable to those in the U.S. or Ireland did not occur in Romania until 2005, when the Orthodox Church commented on the matter. Mungiu also declined to state his position on abortion, and said he attempted to keep his film and his personal position separate. Scholars Oana Godeanu-Kenworthy and Oana Popescu-Sandu argued the film was simply about communism, and the minimalism allowed for foreign audiences to see what they wanted, including a statement on the abortion debate.

In the Canadian feminist magazine Herizons, reviewer Maureen Medved judged 4 Months, 3 Weeks and 2 Days to approximate a horror film in depicting the abuses that women suffer when abortion is illegal. In anticipation of the 2008 U.S. presidential election, Time critics Mary and Richard Corliss also cited the film to discourage electing a candidate opposed to Roe v. Wade, saying the film revealed potential negative consequences.

In The Australian Feminist Law Journal, Fiona Jenkins interpreted the story as a morally ambiguous argument that safe abortion services should be allowed, but that Otilia telling Găbița they will never talk about the matter reflects her "trauma not only of what she has undergone but what she has done". Peter T. Chattaway, writing for Christianity Today, opined that "The abortion itself is handled in a way that could be seen to support both sides of the abortion debate", given the abuse to women, but also the portrayal of "the procedure's bloody aftermath". Writer Waltraud Maierhofer also interpreted it as "not simply for or against abortion". Maierhofer commented a woman will consider many things in making a choice, including health, finances and what the potential child would face. In a discussion with Adi, Otilia indicates she would not be ready to enter a marriage and raise a family. Găbița's reasons are never said; it can be presumed she made the decision herself, though Maierhofer wrote at times she appears "irresponsible".

=== Accolades ===
At the 2007 Cannes Film Festival, Cristian Mungiu became the first Romanian filmmaker to win the Palme d'Or, the festival's highest honour. Later, it became the first Romanian work to receive the European Film Award for Best Film. In its home country, it was nominated for 15 Gopo Awards and won nine, including Best Film.

Despite competing for the Academy Award for Best Foreign Language Film, 4 Months, 3 Weeks and 2 Days was not shortlisted, creating controversy among critics and online film fans, as it had won the Palme d'Or. The controversy caused an Academy member to pledge nomination reform, though the category had often sparked criticism. Mungiu later said the omission and subsequent furor brought the picture substantial publicity, and that the experience taught him that critics and festival juries have differing tastes from the Academy.

==== Listicles ====
Best of 2007 rankings
List	Rank
A.O. Scott, The New York Times	1st
Dana Stevens, Slate	1st
Liam Lacey and Rick Groen, The Globe and Mail	2nd
Sheri Linden, The Hollywood Reporter	2nd
Peter Rainer, The Christian Science Monitor	3rd
Manohla Dargis, The New York Times	3rd
Kirk Honeycutt, The Hollywood Reporter	3rd
Scott Foundas, LA Weekly	3rd
Wesley Morris, The Boston Globe	3rd
Carina Chocano, Los Angeles Times	3rd
Ella Taylor, LA Weekly	4th
Kenneth Turan, Los Angeles Times	4th
Kevin Crust, Los Angeles Times	5th
Lisa Schwarzbaum, Entertainment Weekly	8th
Ray Bennett, The Hollywood Reporter	9th

Best of 2008 rankings
List	Rank
Stephen Holden, The New York Times	1st
Mick LaSalle, San Francisco Chronicle	3rd
Rene Rodriguez, The Miami Herald	3rd
Scott Tobias, The A.V. Club	3rd
Noel Murray, The A.V. Club	4th
Richard Corliss, Time	4th
Robert Mondello, NPR	4th
Kyle Smith, New York Post	5th
J. Hoberman, The Village Voice	7th
Anthony Lane, The New Yorker	8th
James Berardinelli, ReelViews	9th
V.A. Musetto, New York Post	9th
Marc Mohan, The Oregonian	10th

== Legacy ==
Following the Academy Award controversy, the Academy reformed its methodology of choosing Best Foreign Language Film nominees, allowing a committee of approximately 20 members to name three favourite candidates, balancing out a shortlist composed by a second committee made up of hundreds of voters. Steven Zeitchik of the Los Angeles Times remarked the nominees of 2011 reflected the change, displaying unorthodox and challenging subject matter such as youth violence (In a Better World), incest by rape (Incendies) and particularly torture (Dogtooth). In 2013, The Wrap named Mungiu "The Man Who Changed Oscar's Rules". In July 2025, it ranked number 6 on Rolling Stone's list of "The 100 Best Movies of the 21st Century."

Mungiu reportedly planned 4 Months, 3 Weeks and 2 Days to be the first in a loose series of films titled "Tales from a Golden Age". Mungiu explained that "the golden age of Romania" is a term used nationally for Ceaușescu's final nine years in power, though he said people then suffered "shortages and hardship". He intended to make six short films under the banner "Tales from the Golden Age", and then allow younger directors to take over the series. In 2009, he released a single film called Tales from the Golden Age, following 4 Months, 3 Weeks and 2 Days in depicting the Ceaușescu era and starring Vlad Ivanov. His next film, Beyond the Hills (2012), similarly depicted Romanian extremism, and Mungiu was inspired to make the cinematic adaptation after seeing the stage version in New York while promoting 4 Months, 3 Weeks and 2 Days. (Note: Unlike 4 Months, 3 Weeks and 2 Days, Beyond the Hills was shortlisted for Best Foreign Language Film at the 85th Academy Awards.) The 2020 film Never Rarely Sometimes Always was partly inspired by 4 Months, 3 Weeks and 2 Days.

== See also ==
- List of Romanian submissions for the Academy Award for Best Foreign Language Film
- List of submissions to the 80th Academy Awards for Best Foreign Language Film
