= Anamaria Marinca =

Romanian actress (born 1978)

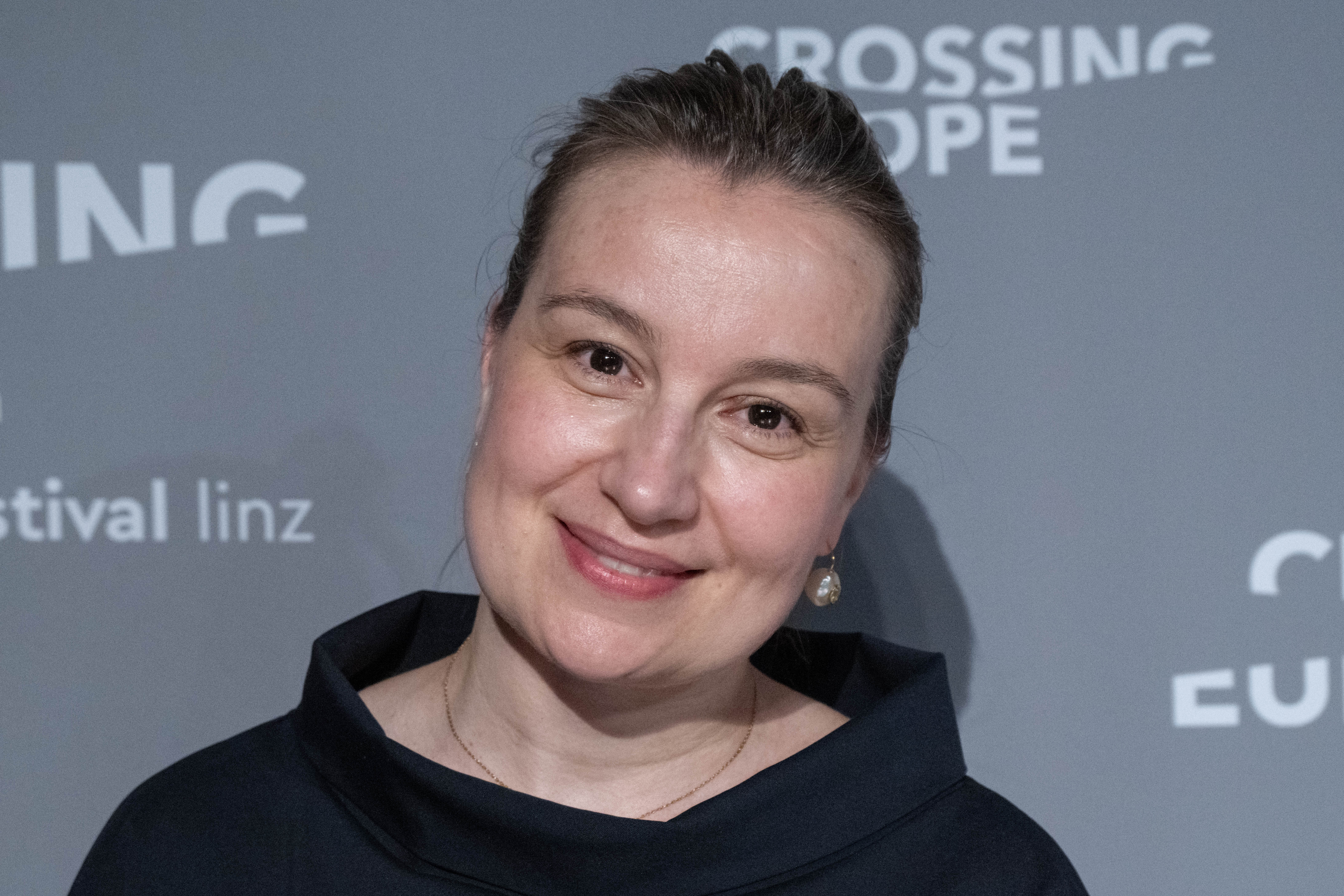
- Marinca at the Crossing Europe film festival in Linz, 2025
- Born: 1 April 1978 (age 48); Iași, Romania
- Occupation: Actress
- Years active: 2004–present

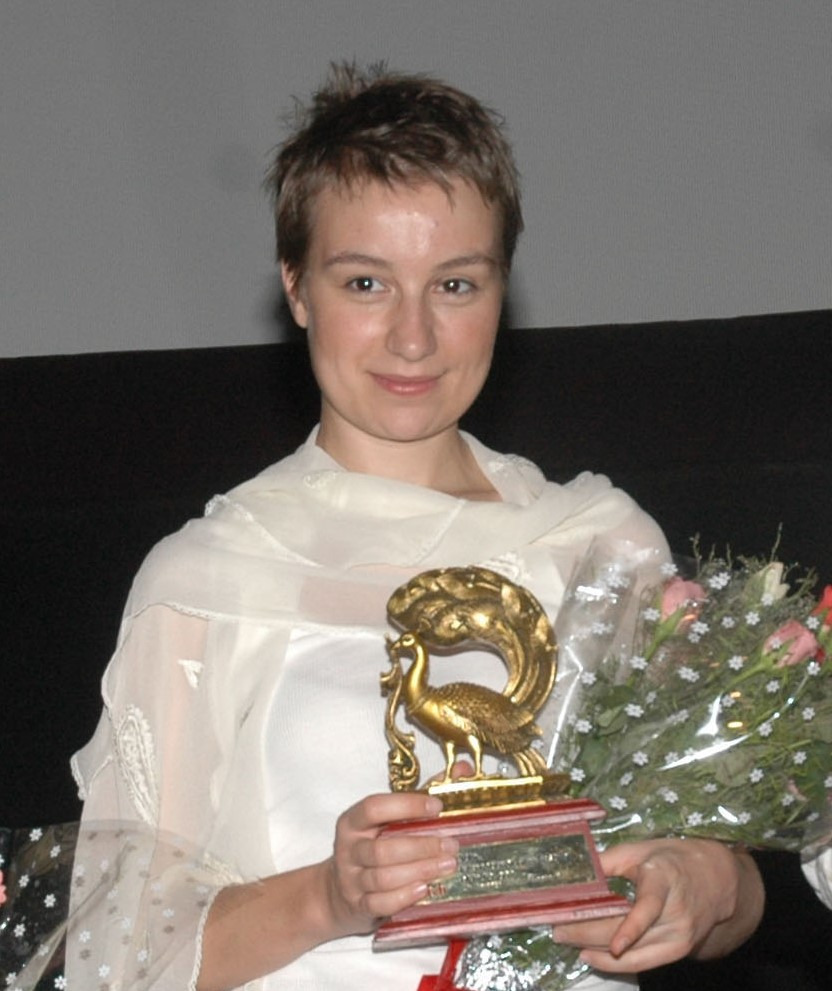
Marinca during a presentation of 4 Months, 3 Weeks and 2 Days at International Film Festival of India on November 24, 2007 in Panaji, Goa

Anamaria Marinca (born 1 April 1978) is a Romanian actress. She made her screen debut with the Channel 4 film Sex Traffic, for which she won the British Academy Television Award for Best Actress. Marinca is also known for her performance in 4 Months, 3 Weeks and 2 Days, earning several awards for her performance, and was nominated for the European Film Award for Best Actress, London Film Critics Circle Award for Actress of the Year, Los Angeles Film Critics Association Award for Best Actress and National Society of Film Critics Award for Best Actress. In 2008, at the 58th Berlin International Film Festival, she was presented the Shooting Stars Award by the European Film Promotion.

== Life and career ==
Marinca was born in Iași, Romania. She grew up with a strong foundation in the arts. Her mother was a classically trained violinist while her father was a theatre professor at the university level. She studied the violin all throughout her childhood when, at around the age of seven, she had announced she wanted to become an actress.

Marinca graduated from the University of Fine Arts, Music and Drama "George Enescu" in Iași.

In 2005, she won three Best Actress Awards (the BAFTA Television Awards, the Royal Television Society Award and the 'Golden Nymph' at 45th Festival de Télévision de Monte Carlo) for her role in Sex Traffic, a CBC/Channel 4 drama about human trafficking. As well as appearing on stage in Romanian theatre productions, she also acted in Measure for Measure at the National Theatre in London.

In 2007, she starred in the Romanian film 4 luni, 3 săptămâni și 2 zile (4 Months, 3 Weeks and 2 Days) by Cristian Mungiu, which won the Palme d'Or at the 2007 Cannes Film Festival, and two other awards (the Cinema Prize of the French National Education System and the FIPRESCI Prize). She also appeared in the Francis Ford Coppola film Youth Without Youth. In 2008, she appeared as Yasim Anwar in the BBC 5-episode miniseries The Last Enemy. Marinca appeared in the Romanian drama Boogie and Oliver Hirschbiegel's acclaimed Five Minutes of Heaven. She later had a prominent role in the 2014 film Fury, in which she played a German woman named Irma who meets up with an American tank crew during World War II. She is a regular in the Welsh TV detective series Hinterland.

== Filmography ==
=== Film ===
Year	Title	Role	Notes
2007	4 Months, 3 Weeks and 2 Days	Otilia Mihărtescu	Romanian: 4 luni, 3 săptămâni și 2 zile
2007	Youth Without Youth	Hotel Receptionist	
2008	Boogie	Smaranda Ciocăzanu	Also released as Summer Holiday
2009	Five Minutes of Heaven	Vika	
2009	Storm	Mira Arendt	
2009	The Countess	Anna Darvulia	
2010	The Aviatrix of Kazbek	The Aviatrix of Kazbek	Dutch: De vliegenierster van Kazbek
2010	The Pizza Miracle	The Madonna of the Eels	Short film
2010	Look, Stranger	Anna	
2011	Perfect Sense	Street performer	
2011	Ouroboros	Eva	Short film
2012	A Cloud in a Glass of Water	Anna	French: Un Nuage Dans Un Verre D'Eau
2013	Europa Report	Rosa Dasque	
2014	Fury	Irma	
2015	Floride	Ivona	Also released under English title Florida
2016	The Girl with All the Gifts	Dr. Jean Selkirk	
2017	Ghost in the Shell	Dr Dahlin	
2017	Nico, 1988	Sylvia	
2020	The Old Guard	Dr. Meta Kozak	
2020	The Bike Thief	Elena	
2022	You Won't Be Alone	Maria	
2023	Housekeeping For Beginners	Dita	Macedonian: Домаќинство за почетници

=== Television ===
Year	Title	Role	Notes
2004	Sex Traffic	Elena Visinescu	Miniseries; 2 of 2 episodes, Main Role
2006	Hotel Babylon	Natasha	TV Series; 1 episode: (S01 Ep03)
2008	The Last Enemy	Yasim Anwar	Miniseries; 5 of 5 episodes
2009	Sleep with Me	Sylvie	Television film
2010	Holby City	Mother	TV series; 2 episodes: My No. 1 Fan (S13 Ep05) & The Lying Kind (S13 Ep09)
2011	Holby City	Nadiya Tereschenko	TV series; 1 episode: Wise Men (S14 Ep11)
2012	Wallander	Inese	TV series; 1 episode: The Dogs of Riga (S03 Ep01)
2012	Doctor Who	Darla von Karlsen	TV series; 1 episode: Asylum of the Daleks (S07 Ep01)
2013	The Politician's Husband	Dita	Miniseries; 3 of 5 episodes (Parts 1, 2, & 3)
2013–2015	Hinterland	Meg Mathias	TV series; 4 episodes: In the Dead of Night - Part 1 (S02 Ep01), In the Dead of Night - Part 2 (S02 Ep02), Ceredigion - Part 1 (S02 Ep03), & Ceredigion - Part 2 (S02 Ep04)
2014	The Missing	Rini Dalca	TV series; 3 episodes: Gone Fishing (S01 Ep04), Molly (S01 Ep05), & Till Death (S01 Ep08)
2015	River	Ema	Miniseries; 1 of 6 episodes (Part 5)
2016-2018	Mars	Marta Kamen	TV series; 12 episodes, regular
2017	Inspector George Gently	Eve Liddell	TV series; 1 Episode: Gently Liberated (S08 Ep01)
2018	Midsomer Murders	Petra Antonescu	TV Series; 1 episode: Death by Persuasion (S19 Ep05)
2019	Tin Star	Sarah Nickel	TV series; 8 episodes, Season 2 regular
2019-2021	Temple	Suzanna	TV series; 9 episode, recurring role
2022 - Present	The Chelsea Detective	Astrid Fischer	TV series; 4 episodes: The Wages of Sin (S01 Ep01), Mrs Romano (S01 Ep02), The Gentle Giant (S01 Ep03), & A Chelsea Education (S01 Ep04)

== Stage credits ==
Title	Year	Role	Production	Notes
Measure for Measure	2006	Mariana	National Theatre, London	
4:48 Psychosis	2009		Young Vic Theatre, London.	Sarah Kane's final play, directed by Christian Benedetti
Routes	2013	Anka	Royal Court Theatre	

== Radio credits ==
Title	Year	Role	Production	Notes
Burying the Typewriter	2012	narrator	Sweet Talk Productions	BBC Radio 4 Book of the Week
Angielski	2015	narrator	Sweet Talk Productions	BBC Radio 4 series
Barbeque 67: The Original Summer of Love	2022	Tereza	International Arts Partnership	BBC Radio 4 play

== Awards and nominations ==
Year	Award	Category	Nominated work	Result
2005	BAFTA Award	Best Actress	Sex Traffic	Won
2005	Golden Nymph Awards	Best Performance by an Actress in a Miniseries	Sex Traffic	Won
2005	Gemini Award	Best Performance by an Actress in a Leading Role in a Dramatic Program or Miniseries	Sex Traffic	Nominated
2005	Royal Television Society Award	Best Actor – Female	Sex Traffic	Won
2008	European Film Award	Best Actress	4 Months, 3 Weeks and 2 Days	Nominated
2008	Gopo Awards	Best Actress in a Leading Role	4 Months, 3 Weeks and 2 Days	Won
2008	International Cinephile Society Award	Best Actress	4 Months, 3 Weeks and 2 Days	Won
2008	London Film Critics Circle Award	Actress of the Year	4 Months, 3 Weeks and 2 Days	Nominated
2008	Los Angeles Film Critics Association Award	Best Actress	4 Months, 3 Weeks and 2 Days	Runner-up
2008	National Society of Film Critics Award	Best Actress	4 Months, 3 Weeks and 2 Days	Nominated
2008	Palm Springs International Film Festival Award	Best Actress (shared with Laura Vasiliu)	4 Months, 3 Weeks and 2 Days	Won
2008	Stockholm Film Festival Award	Best Actress	4 Months, 3 Weeks and 2 Days	Won
2008	Village Voice Film Poll	Best Actress	4 Months, 3 Weeks and 2 Days	Won
2008	Vancouver Film Critics Circle Award	Best Actress	4 Months, 3 Weeks and 2 Days	Nominated
2009	Gopo Awards	Best Actress in a Leading Role	Boogie	Won
2009	Romanian Filmmakers Union Award	Best Actress	Boogie	Won

== See also ==
- Romanian New Wave
