= Beyond the Hills =

2012 film by Cristian Mungiu

- Film poster
- Directed by: Cristian Mungiu
- Written by: Cristian Mungiu
- Based on: Deadly Confession and Judges' Book by Tatiana Niculescu Bran
- Starring: Cosmina Stratan; Cristina Flutur
- Cinematography: Oleg Mutu
- Edited by: Mircea Olteanu
- Production companies: Mobra Films; Why Not Productions; Les Films du Fleuve; France 3 Cinéma; Mandragora Movies
- Release dates: 19 May 2012 (Cannes); 26 October 2012 (Romania)
- Running time: 155 minutes
- Countries: Romania; France
- Language: Romanian
- Box office: $124,919 (US)

Beyond the Hills (Romanian: După dealuri) is a 2012 Romanian drama film written and directed by Cristian Mungiu, starring Cristina Flutur and Cosmina Stratan. The narrative follows two young women at an Eastern Orthodox convent in Romania.

== Plot ==
Two Romanian orphaned young women, Voichița and Alina, visit a Romanian Orthodox convent during Lent, where Voichița tells Alina the altar includes an icon that grants wishes. Alina had been working in Germany, and the two girls were previously roommates at a children's home and had shared a physical relationship. The monastery is led by a 30-year-old Priest who speaks ill of declining faith in Western Europe, citing same-sex marriage, and forbids anyone outside of the faith from entering. He inquires about Alina to Voichița, who tells him Alina irregularly attends church and does not go to confession. They urge Alina to begin confessing. Alina hopes to sleep with Voichița, but Voichița tells her they must be cautious given it is Lent.

Some time later after Alina has left the convent, Voichița retrieves her, but Voichița tells Alina she is now a nun, that she has chosen to be with God so she will never be alone, and her love of Alina is different from before. They return to the convent, but Alina asks Voichița that they escape together. After Voichița refuses, Alina attempts to jump down a well, but is restrained by the nuns and taken to the hospital. There, doctors restrain Alina to prevent her self-harm, after which they send her back to the convent to assist with recovery. There, the nuns read to Alina about sin. Alina begins a Black Fast, but when the Priest learns of this when Alina is not at the table, they see Alina is attempting to enter the altar to make a wish to the icon. The Priest admits the icon exists, but says entering the altar is a severe sin, and tells the nuns the Devil is in Alina and the convent.

Alina remains tied down to a board with chains and towels. The nuns witness a worsening in her condition and take her back to the hospital. There, the hospital staff find Alina is dead on arrival, and observe the wounds on her wrists and ankles from the restraints. The staff tells the nuns this constitutes homicide and threatens to call the police and media. An officer investigates the convent. Seeing the board Alina was tied to, the officer interprets it as a cross. The officer also says forcible restraint leading to death is a homicide. The Priest denies criminal intent, saying the restraints were to prevent self-harm, and invoking the analogy of a parent's right to force children to take medicine, though the officer replies Alina was not a child and the Priest was not her guardian. The nuns also cite Alina's strength as mysterious, but Voichița says Alina studied martial arts. The police take the Priest and the nuns who tied up Alina away, with Voichița choosing to go with them.

== Cast ==
- Cosmina Stratan as Voichița
- Cristina Flutur as Alina
- Valeriu Andriuță as Priest
- Dana Tapalagă as Mother superior
- Cătălina Harabagiu as Antonia
- Gina Țandură as nun Iustina
- Vica Agache as nun Elisabeta
- Nora Covali as Nun Pahomia
- Dionisie Vitcu as Mr. Valerică

== Production ==
The screenplay was inspired by two novels by the writer Tatiana Niculescu Bran, documenting the Tanacu exorcism, in which a young member of a monastery in Moldavia died in 2005 after an exorcism ritual. Mungiu was inspired to make the film after seeing the stage version in New York while promoting 4 Months, 3 Weeks and 2 Days.

The film production was made through the director's company, Mobra Films. It also received production support from Belgium and France. It received €273,100 from Romania's National Centre for Cinema and €400,000 from Eurimages. Filming took place from November 2011 to February 2012.

== Release ==
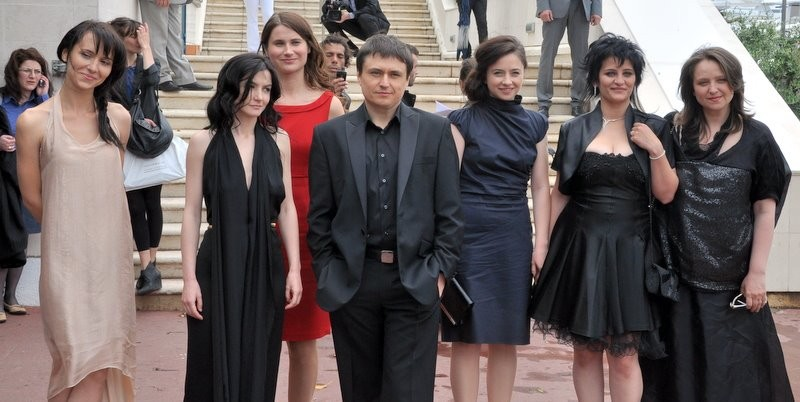
Cast and crew at the 2012 Cannes Film Festival

The film premiered in the main competition at the 2012 Cannes Film Festival, where it was screened on 19 May. At Cannes, Mungiu won the award for Best Screenplay, while Cristina Flutur and Cosmina Stratan shared the award for Best Actress. It was selected as the Romanian entry for the Best Foreign Language Oscar at the 85th Academy Awards, making the January shortlist. The film also won the Golden Ástor for Best Film at the 2012 Mar del Plata International Film Festival.

== Reception ==
On review aggregator website Rotten Tomatoes, the film holds an approval rating of 91% based on 107 reviews, with an average rating of 8.1/10.

Dan Fainaru of Screen Daily wrote from Cannes: "Spare, unadorned and strikingly shot, Cristian Mungiu's film is an unusual rendering of a Romanian exorcism case and is bound to split both audience and critical opinions, some considering it a major achievement and others blaming it for overlong pretentious sensationalism. But it will certainly not pass unnoticed."

Sight & Sound film magazine listed the film at #8 on its list of best films of 2012.

== See also ==
- Romanian New Wave
- List of submissions to the 85th Academy Awards for Best Foreign Language Film
- List of Romanian submissions for the Academy Award for Best Foreign Language Film
- List of lesbian, gay, bisexual or transgender-related films of 2012
