= Laura Vasiliu =

Romanian actress

- Born: 25 January 1976 (age 49); Piatra Neamț, Romania
- Occupation: Actress

Laura Vasiliu (born 25 January 1976) is a Romanian actress.

Born in Piatra Neamț, she shared an interest in the arts with her mother, with whom she would practice William Shakespeare works. Laura learned to act while spending time in a hospital with an actress.

After going on to act on stage and in film, Vasiliu came to international prominence after starring in the Palme d'Or-winning 2007 film 4 Months, 3 Weeks and 2 Days. At the Palm Springs International Film Festival, she won Best Actress for her role in 4 Months, 3 Weeks and 2 Days.

In 2016, she starred in the film Fiore, which screened at the Cannes Film Festival.
