= Cristian Mungiu =

Romanian filmmaker (born 1968)

- Mungiu in 2025
- Born: 1968 (age 57–58); Iași, Romania
- Education: Alexandru Ioan Cuza University
- Occupations: Filmmaker and producer
- Years active: 1998–present
- Spouse: Izabela Coman
- Children: 2
- Relatives: Alina Mungiu-Pippidi (sister)

Cristian Mungiu (Romanian: [kristiˈan munˈdʒi.u]; born 1968) is a Romanian filmmaker. A figure in the Romanian New Wave, his films usually explore Romania's contemporary society and politics.

He is best known for 4 Months, 3 Weeks and 2 Days (2007) and Fjord (2026), for which he won the Palme d'Or at the Cannes Film Festival. For Beyond the Hills (2012) and Graduation (2016), he won Best Screenplay and Best Director prizes at the 65th and 69th editions, respectively.

== Early life ==
Cristian Mungiu was born in 1968 in Iași, Romania. His sister is political analyst Alina Mungiu-Pippidi.

After studying English literature at the Alexandru Ioan Cuza University, he worked for a few years as a teacher and journalist. He subsequently enrolled at the I. L. Caragiale National University of Theatre and Film in Bucharest to study film directing, graduating in 1998. Mungiu made several short films after graduating.

== Career ==
=== 2000s ===
Mungiu's debut feature, Occident (2002), premiered in the Directors' Fortnight section of the 55th Cannes Film Festival. It stars Alexandru Papadopol as Luci, and follows the Romanian immigration to the "West" (Central Europe) after failing to be financially successful in Romania

4 Months, 3 Weeks and 2 Days (2007) premiered in the main competition of the 60th Cannes Film Festival, where it received critical acclaim and won the Palme d'Or, marking the first time the prize was awarded to a Romanian filmmaker. Starring Anamaria Marinca and Laura Vasiliu, and set in the final years of Nicolae Ceaușescu's regime, it follows two students, roommates in a university dormitory, in search of an abortion. The film quickly became the subject of controversy in numerous countries over the abortion debate. It was also selected as the Romanian entry for Best Foreign Language Film at the 80th Academy Awards, but was controversially not nominated. At the 20th European Film Awards, it won Best Film and Best Director.

Tales from the Golden Age (2009), an omnibus film (co-directed with Hanno Höfer, Constantin Popescu, Ioana Uricaru, and Răzvan Mărculescu), premiered in the Un Certain Regard section at the 62nd Cannes Film Festival. Set in the "Golden Age" of the Nicolae Ceaușescu's regime, the sreenplay was fully written by Mungiu, who is also credit as producer.

=== 2010s ===
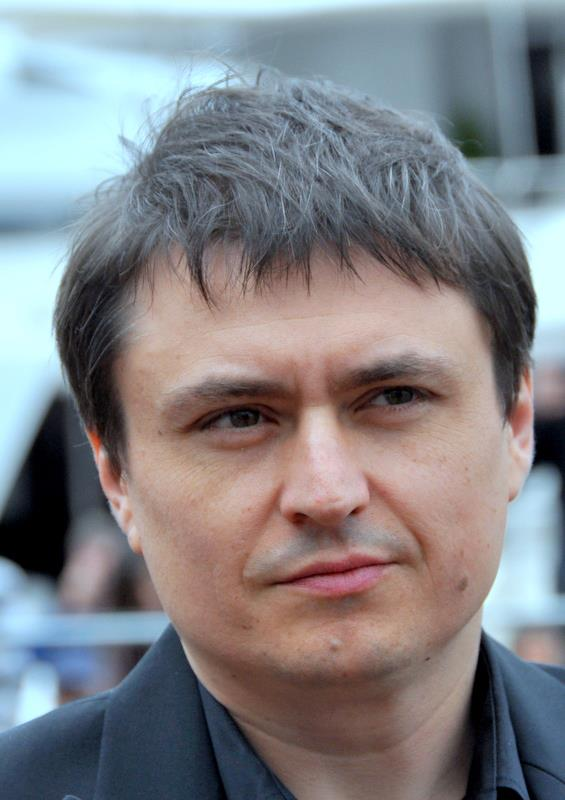
Mungiu in 2012

Beyond the Hills (2012) premiered in the main competition of the 65th Cannes Film Festival, where it won the Best Screenplay prize and its two lead actresses (Cristina Flutur and Cosmina Stratan) shared the Best Actress prize. It follows two young women at an Eastern Orthodox convent in contemporary Romania. The film received critical acclaim, and was selected as the Romanian entry for Best Foreign Language Film at the 85th Academy Awards, making the December shortlist.

In 2013, he served as a jury member of the main competition of the 66th Cannes Film Festival. In 2016, he produced Nae Caranfil's 6.9 on the Richter Scale.

Graduation (2016) premiered in the main competition of the 69th Cannes Film Festival, where it won the Best Director prize. Set in Transylvania, it stars Adrian Titieni as Romeo, a doctor on a quest to fix his daughter's (Maria-Victoria Dragus) exam results by underhanded means. The film received critical acclaim, and Mungiu was nominated for the European Film Award for Best Director and the European Film Award for Best Screenwriter.

In June 2016, Mungiu was invited to join the Academy of Motion Picture Arts and Sciences.

=== 2020s ===
In 2021, Mungiu presided over the Critics' Week jury of the 74th Cannes Film Festival.

After a small hiatus of six years, Mungiu returned with R.M.N. (2022), which premiered in the main competition of the 75th Cannes Film Festival, where it was nominated for the Palme d'Or. Set in a multi-ethnic village in Transylvania during the 2019–20 holiday season, it is based on the 2020 Ditrău xenophobic incident. It follows Matthias (Marin Grigore), a man who returns from Germany, and his ex-lover Csilla, who works in the village. The film received critical acclaim and was nominated for the Gotham Award for Best Screenplay.

Fjord (2026) premiered in the main competition of the 79th Cannes Film Festival, where it won Mungiu's second Palme d'Or (marking the tenth filmmaker to win the award twice), the François Chalais Prize, the FIPRESCI Prize, the Prize of the Ecumenical Jury, and the Prix de la Citoyenneté. Starring Sebastian Stan and Renate Reinsve, it follows a conservative Romanian-Norwegian couple facing scrutiny after moving to the wife's progressive remote Norwegian hometown. The film received critical acclaim and was nominated for five European Film Awards, including Best Film and Best Director.

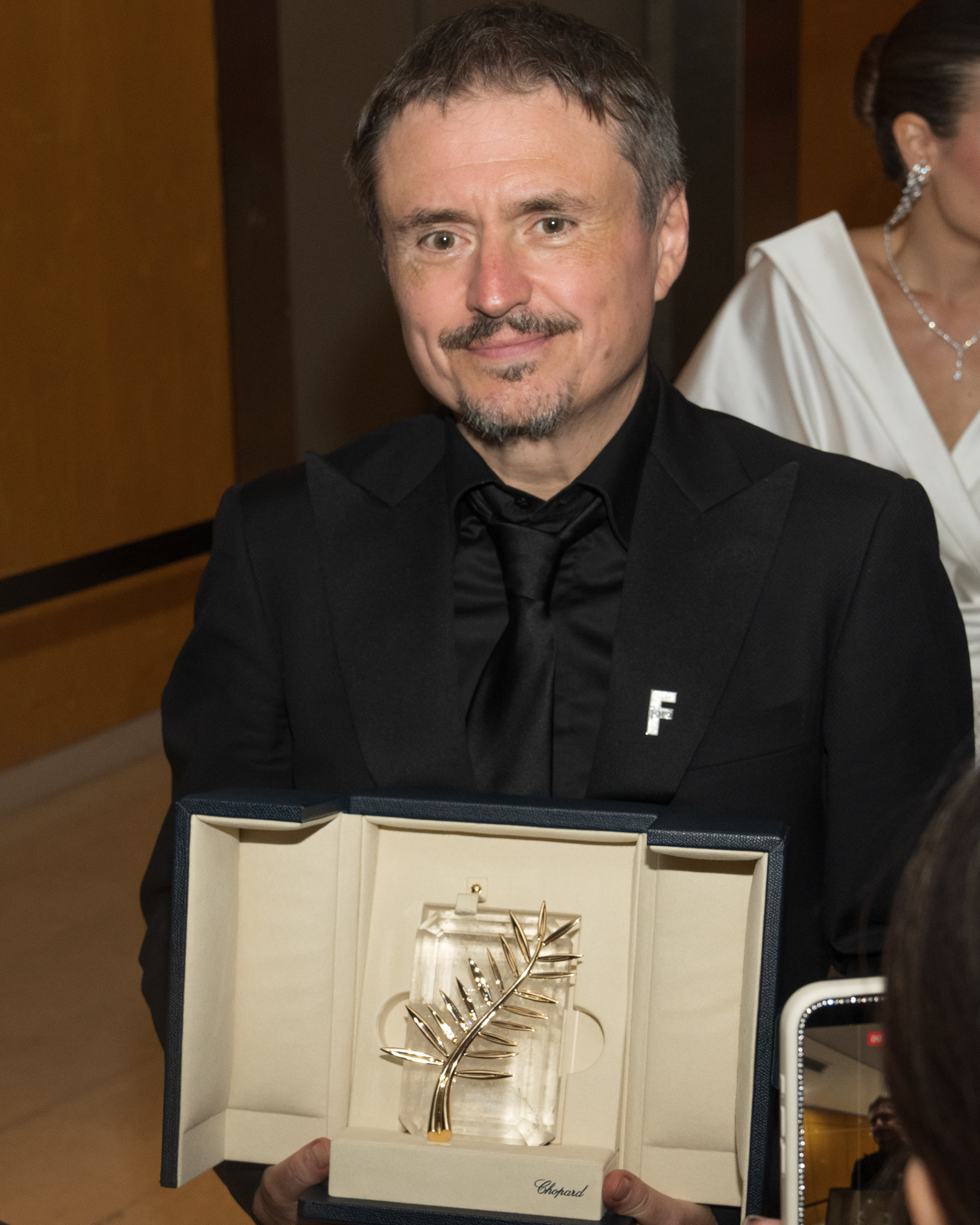
Mungiu holding the Palme d'Or, awarded for Fjord (2026), at the 79th Cannes Film Festival

== Filmography ==
=== Feature films ===
Year	English title	Original title	Notes
2002	Occident		
2007	4 Months, 3 Weeks and 2 Days	4 luni, 3 săptămâni și 2 zile	Also producer
2009	Tales from the Golden Age	Amintiri din epoca de aur	Omnibus film; Also producer
2012	Beyond the Hills	După dealuri	Also producer
2016	Graduation	Bacalaureat	Also producer
2022	R.M.N.		Also producer
2026	Fjord		Also producer

=== Short films ===
Year	Title	Note(s)
2000	Corul pompierilor	
2000	Nicio întâmplare	
2000	Zapping	
2005	Turkey Girl	Segment of Omnibus film Lost and Found

==== Screenwriting credits ====
- 2024: Traffic (Jaful Secolului), directed by Teodora Mihai

==== Producing credits ====
Year	English title	Original title	Director(s)	Notes
2016	6.9 on the Richter Scale	6,9 pe scara Richter	Nae Caranfil	
2018	The Sisters Brothers		Jacques Audiard	Associate producer
2018	Lemonade		Ioana Uricaru	
2021	The Father Who Moves Mountains	Tata muta muntii	Daniel Sandu	
2021	La Civil		Teodora Mihai	Co-producer
2024	Traffic	Jaful Secolului	Teodora Mihai	
2026	Transit Times		Ana Felicia Scutelnicu	Co-producer

== Accolades ==
Award	Year	Category	Film	Result	Ref.
Bodil Awards	2008	Best Non-American Film	4 Months, 3 Weeks and 2 Days	Nominated	
Cannes Film Festival	2007	Palme d'Or	4 Months, 3 Weeks and 2 Days	Won	
Cannes Film Festival	2007	FIPRESCI Prize	4 Months, 3 Weeks and 2 Days	Won	
Cannes Film Festival	2007	French National Education Administration Prize	4 Months, 3 Weeks and 2 Days	Won	
Cannes Film Festival	2009	Un Certain Regard	Tales from the Golden Age	Nominated	
Cannes Film Festival	2012	Palme d'Or	Beyond the Hills	Nominated	
Cannes Film Festival	2012	Best Screenplay	Beyond the Hills	Won	
Cannes Film Festival	2016	Palme d'Or	Graduation	Nominated	
Cannes Film Festival	2016	Best Director	Graduation	Won	
Cannes Film Festival	2022	Palme d'Or	R.M.N.	Nominated	
Cannes Film Festival	2026	Palme d'Or	Fjord	Won	
Cannes Film Festival	2026	FIPRESCI Prize	Fjord	Won	
Cannes Film Festival	2026	François Chalais Prize	Fjord	Won	
Cannes Film Festival	2026	Prize of the Ecumenical Jury	Fjord	Won	
Cannes Film Festival	2026	Prix de la Citoyenneté	Fjord	Won	
César Awards	2008	Best Foreign Film	4 Months, 3 Weeks and 2 Days	Nominated	
César Awards	2017	Best Foreign Film	Graduation	Nominated	
Chicago International Film Festival	2016	Silver Hugo for Best Screenplay	Graduation	Won	
David di Donatello	2008	Best European Film	4 Months, 3 Weeks and 2 Days	Nominated	
European Film Awards	2007	European Film (shared with Oleg Mutu)	4 Months, 3 Weeks and 2 Days	Won	
European Film Awards	2007	European Director	4 Months, 3 Weeks and 2 Days	Won	
European Film Awards	2007	European Screenwriter	4 Months, 3 Weeks and 2 Days	Nominated	
European Film Awards	2012	European Screenwriter	Beyond the Hills	Nominated	
European Film Awards	2016	European Screenwriter	Graduation	Nominated	
European Film Awards	2016	European Director	Graduation	Nominated	
European Film Awards	2016	European University Film Award	Graduation	Nominated	
Gopo Awards	2008	Best Feature Film (shared with Oleg Mutu)	4 Months, 3 Weeks and 2 Days	Won	
Gopo Awards	2008	Best Directing	4 Months, 3 Weeks and 2 Days	Won	
Gopo Awards	2008	Best Screenplay	4 Months, 3 Weeks and 2 Days	Nominated	
Gopo Awards	2008	Audience Award	4 Months, 3 Weeks and 2 Days	Won	
Gopo Awards	2010	Audience Award	Tales from the Golden Age	Won	
Gotham Awards	2023	Best Screenplay	R.M.N.	Nominated	
Goya Awards	2009	Best European Film	4 Months, 3 Weeks and 2 Days	Won	
Film Independent Spirit Awards	2009	Best Foreign Film	4 Months, 3 Weeks and 2 Days	Nominated	
Mar del Plata International Film Festival	2012	Golden Ástor	Beyond the Hills	Won	

== Honors ==
- Romanian royal family: 70th Knight of the Royal Decoration of the Cross of the Royal House of Romania

== See also ==
- Romanian New Wave
