= Italiencele =

2004 film

- Directed by: Nap Toader
- Starring: Mara Nicolescu; Ana Ularu
- Release date: 15 October 2004
- Running time: 1h 22min
- Country: Romania
- Language: Romanian

Italiencele is a 2004 Romanian comedy film directed by Nap Toader.

== Cast ==
- Mara Nicolescu - Jeni
- Ana Ularu - Lenuta
- Costel Cascaval - Gigel
- Vlad Zamfirescu - Giovanni
- Emil Hostina - Fane
- Valentin Popescu - Girls' father
- Constantin Drăgănescu - Nea Chitu
- Valentin Teodosiu - Police officer
