= Sunt o babă comunistă =

2013 Romanian drama film

Sunt o babă comunistă (Romanian: I Am An Old Communist Hag) is a 2013 Romanian drama film directed by Stere Gulea. It stars Luminița Gheorghiu, Marian Râlea, and Ana Ularu. Set in 2010 post-communist Romania, the title character and her husband are visited by their daughter who has been living in the United States for the last 10 years. This prompts her to reflect on the changes that have taken place during Romania since the fall of Communism. The film is cut with flashbacks to her halcyon communist days whilst she tries to fix her daughters' money problems.

The film is based on a novel with the same title by Dan Lungu. It was largely shot in Călărași and around the ruins of the Călărași steel works.

== Cast ==
- Luminița Gheorghiu – Emilia
- Marian Râlea – Țucu
- Ana Ularu – Alice
- Valeria Seciu – Mrs. Stroescu
- Collin Blair – Alan
- Andrei Huțuleac – Cătălin
- Alexandra Buza – Celina
- Coca Bloos – Maricica
- Anca Sigartău – Sanda
- Tania Popa – Aurelia
- Gabriel Spahiu – Culidiuc
- Constantin Florescu – Sorin
- Ionel Mihăilescu – Costel
- Bogdan Talașman – milițian
- Viorica Geanta Chelbea – Catrina
- Eduard-Mihai Cârlan – Celestin
- Constantin Drăgănescu – Nea Pancu
- Paul Chiribuță – Nea Mitu
- Petru Ghimbasan – Emilia's father
- Patricia Poslusnic – young Alice
- Ana Teona Petcu – young Emilia
- Costel Constantin – Steel works director
- Ingrid Bisu – Hairdresser 1
- Alexandra Pirici – Hairdresser 2
- Irina Drăgănescu – Hairdresser 3
- Cristian Martin – Securitate officer at parade
- Ion Grosu – Securitate officer at factory
- Alexandru Potocean – film director
- Andreea Vasile – costume assistant
- Daniel Popa – assistant director
- Alexandra Botău – assistant director 2
- Mihai Dinvale – department head
- Mircea Andreescu – neighbor
- Mihai Gruia Sandu – market seller
- Șerban Pavlu – bus driver
- Daniel Stanciu – janitor
- Mara Căruțașu – Aurelia store saleswoman
- Dan Tudor – Communist Party activist
- Yun Tang – Chinese at marketplace
- Ștefan Alexa – real estate agent
