= Ingrid Bisu =

Romanian actress

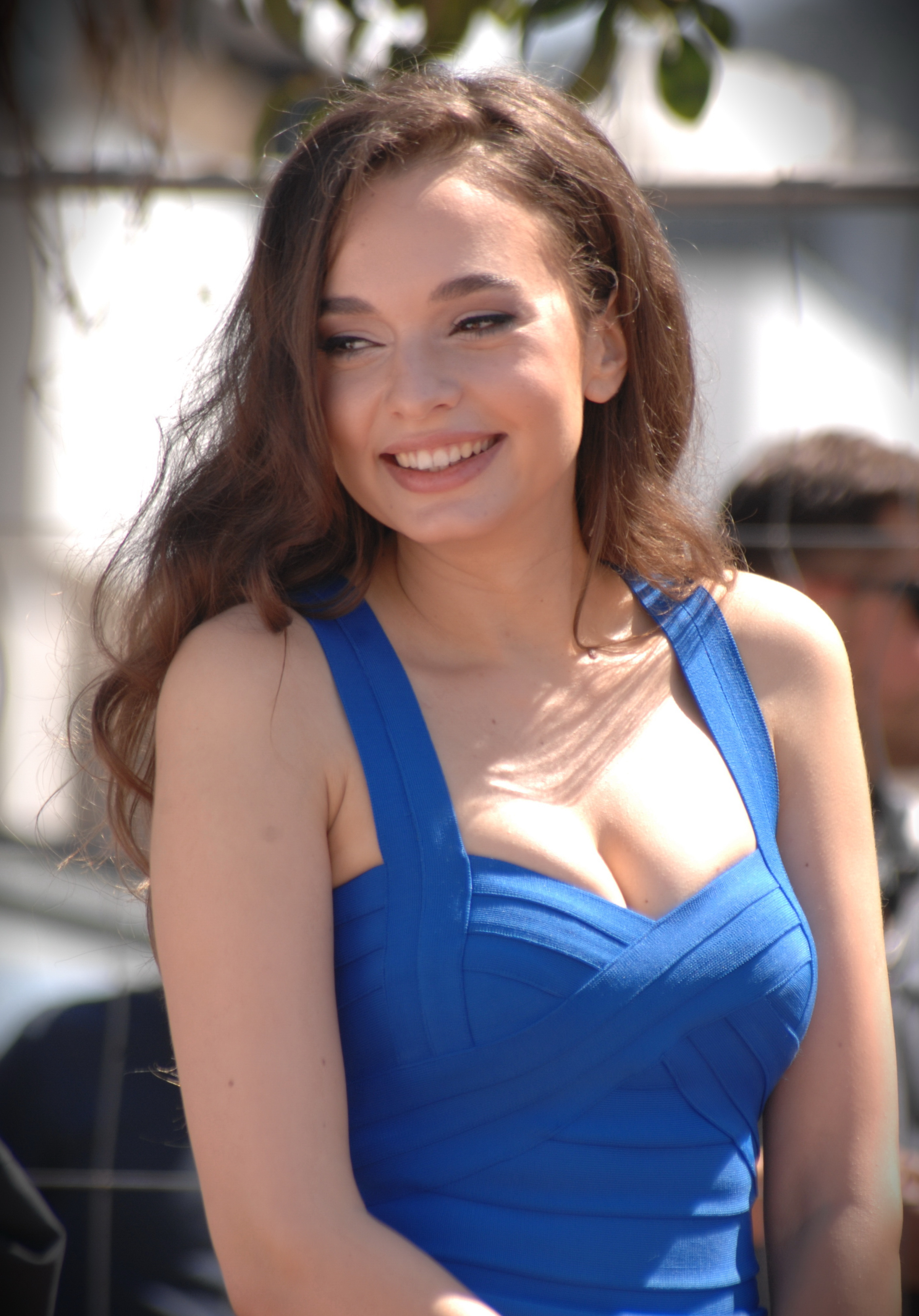
- Born: Ingrid Bișu; 15 September 1987 (age 39); Bucharest, Socialist Republic of Romania
- Occupations: Actress; producer; writer
- Years active: 2003–present
- Spouse: James Wan (m. 2019)

Ingrid Wan (née Bișu) (born 15 September 1987) is a Romanian–American actress, producer, and screenwriter. She is best known for her appearance in the film Toni Erdmann (2016), The Nun (2018), and for co-writing and executive producing the horror films Malignant (2021) and Soulm8te (2026).

== Early life ==
Bisu was born on 15 September 1987 in Bucharest to Romanian-German parents. She grew up in the German community in Romania, attending the German kindergarten, high school, and college in Bucharest.

In 2003, at the age of 16, Bisu had her first photoshoot in the teenage magazine "Cool Girl" and then landed her first commercial for Orange S.A. Mobile, which was broadcast in Israel and Romania.

== Career ==
=== Early career (2003-2014) ===
Bisu made her debut in Romanian TV series Căsătorie de Probă (Marriage of Probation). Following this, she was featured in a number of Romanian magazines and television interviews. Bisu played an unnamed character in the 2005 critical and commercial failure BloodRayne and had other small roles in sitcoms such as La Bloc (In the Block of Flats) and Arestat la domiciliu (Under House Arrest), produced by Pro TV.

In 2006, Bisu played the lead role of Alice in the drama television movie O lume a durerii (A World of Pain), which depicted the struggles of teenage girls in Romania at the time. Her performance gained the attention of director Cristian Mungiu, who cast Bisu as Viviana in one segment of the anthology film Tales from the Golden Age. The film, written by Mungiu and directed by five other directors, was screened in the Un Certain Regard section at the 2009 Cannes Film Festival. In 2007, Bisu enrolled in the Hyperion Academy of Dramatic Arts in Bucharest. During this time she appeared as Naomi in the drama series 17: O poveste despre destin (17: A Story About Destiny) on Prima TV, and as Bianca in the comedy series Nimeni nu-i perfect (Nobody's Perfect).

After roles in the horror film Slaughter and the Christmas comedy Ho Ho Ho, Bisu played a minor role in the movie What War May Bring, directed by Claude Lelouch. She then appeared in the film Portrait of the Fighter as a Young Man, directed by Constantin Popescu, where she played the real-life figure Matilda Jubleanu.

In 2011, Bisu starred in Outbound, a Romanian film with co-story credit by Cristian Mungiu, debuting at the Locarno International Film Festival, Viennale. The same year, she became a presenter on Romanian national morning TV show on Kanal D Romania. Cafeaua de dimineață (Morning Coffee), was a two-hour live morning news program.

In 2012, Bisu played minor roles in Romanian films Sunt o babă comunistă (I Am an Old Communist Hag), directed by Stere Gulea, and Roxanne, directed by Vali Hotea. In 2013, she played Minerva in the American horror movie Dracula: The Dark Prince starring Jon Voight. The same year, she played an uncredited role in the science fiction film The Zero Theorem, directed by Terry Gilliam, with Matt Damon and Christoph Waltz. In 2014, she played Brittany White, the host of a surreallist five-hour live comedy web program, fictionally broadcast from Ohio (but filmed in Bucharest), called The Super Yolo Sho.

=== International crossover (2016-current) ===
In 2016, Bisu appeared in Toni Erdmann as Anca, the assistant of the lead character played by Sandra Hüller. Directed by Maren Ade, the film received over 56 nominations and 33 award wins. Bisu's character was mentioned by A.O. Scott as being central to understanding the main themes of the film in his review for The New York Times.

In 2018, Bisu then co-starred in the horror film The Nun, a spinoff of The Conjuring 2, playing Sister Oana. She met future husband James Wan on set.

In 2021, she co-wrote, executive produced, and had a supporting role in Malignant, alongside her husband.

== Personal life ==
On 22 June 2019, Bisu became engaged to Australian director James Wan. They married on 4 November 2019.

== Filmography ==
=== Film ===
==== Acting credits ====
Year	Title	Role	Notes
2005	BloodRayne	Young Girl	
2007	La Nic	Cristina	Short film
2009	Slaughter	Girl in Coffin	
2009	Tales from the Golden Age	Viviana	
2009	Ho Ho Ho	Muscle man's girlfriend	
2010	Portretul luptătorului la tinerețe	Matilda Jubleanu	
2010	Eva	Eva's Friend #1	
2010	What War May Bring	Amie2	
2010	Periferic	Selena	
2013	Roxanne	Victor's Girlfriend	
2013	Sunt o babă comunistă	Coafeza	
2013	The Zero Theorem	Work Colleague	Uncredited
2013	Dracula: The Dark Prince	Minerva - Female Prisoner	
2016	Toni Erdmann	Anca	
2018	The Nun	Sister Oana	
2021	The Conjuring: The Devil Made Me Do It	Jessica	
2021	Malignant	CST Winnie	Also story co-writer and executive producer
2023	Aquaman and the Lost Kingdom	Pier Waitress	

==== Writing and producing credits ====
Year	Title	Writer	Producer	Notes
2021	Malignant	Story co-writer	Executive	Also actor role: CST Winnie
2026	Soulm8te	Story co-writer	Executive	

=== Television ===
Year	Title	Role	Notes
2003	Căsătorie de probă	Flori	
2004-2006	La Bloc	Marilena	
2006	O lume a durerii	Alice	Television film
2008	17 – o poveste despre destin	Naomi	
2009	Nimeni nu-i perfect	Bianca	
2011	Cafeaua de dimineață	Host	Also director, screenwriter, and executive producer
2013	Super Yolo Show	Brittany White	Also screenwriter
2014	Rămâi cu mine	Raluca	
