= Dinu Tănase =

Romanian film director and screenwriter

- Born: 26 October 1946; Târgu Ocna, România
- Education: National University of Theatre and Film
- Occupations: Film director, screenwriter, cinematographer
- Years active: 1975 -

Dinu Tănase (born 26 October 1946) is a Romanian film director and screenwriter. He is the director of the Festivalul Indie al producătorilor de film independenți (IPIFF — Independent Producers Indie Film Festival).

He led the team from "Romania-Film" that filmed everything that happened between December 22 and 25, 1989 in the Palace Square area. The recordings from those days were sent to Buftea, for development, after which they disappeared.

== Filmography ==
=== Director ===
- Concert din muzică de Bach (TV film, 1975)
- Trei zile și trei nopți (1976, directorial debut)
- Doctorul Poenaru (1978)
- Mijlocaș la deschidere (1979)
- Întoarce-te și mai privește o dată (1981)
- La capătul liniei (1983)
- Emisia continuă (1984)
- Cântec în zori (1985)
- Condamnați la fericire (1992)
- Damen Tango (2003)
- Portrete în pădure (2014)
- Monseniorul Vladimir Ghika - schiță de portret european (2014)
- Frozen Ignat -Cine a ucis Crăciunul? (2017)

=== Screenwriter ===
- Concert din muzică de Bach (TV film, 1975)
- Doctorul Poenaru (1978)
- Damen Tango (2003)
- Portrete în Pădure (2014)
- Frozen Ignat (2017)

=== Cinematographer ===
- Frații (1971)
- Too Little for Such a Big War (Prea mic pentru un război atît de mare, 1970)
- Apa ca un bivol negru (documentary, 1971) – in collaboration
- Întoarcerea lui Magellan (1974)
- Dincolo de nisipuri (1974)
- Ilustrate cu flori de cîmp (1975)
- Through the Ashes of the Empire (1976)
- Trei zile și trei nopți (1976) – in collaboration with Doru Mitran
- Urmărirea (1971)
- Rosen Emil (1993)
- In Zeichnen der Liebe (1996)
- Gruber's Journey (2007)

=== Producer ===
- Privește înainte cu mînie (1993)
- Timpul liber (1993)
- Crucea de piatră (1994) – in collaboration with Mihai Cârciog
- Everyday God Kisses Us On The Mouth (2001) - directed by Sinișa Dragin (2001)
