= Andy Winter =

Andy Winter is the name of:

- Andy Winter (comics), British comic writer
- Andy Winter (footballer) (born 2002), Scottish footballer
- Andy Winter (musician), Norwegian musician

== See also ==
- Andrew Winter (disambiguation)
