= Femeia visurilor =

2005 film by Dan Pița

- Directed by: Dan Pița
- Written by: Rasvan Popescu
- Produced by: Andrei Boncea
- Starring: Dan Condurache; Răzvan Vasilescu
- Cinematography: Dan Alexandru
- Music by: Adrian Enescu
- Production companies: MediaPro Pictures; Eurofilm
- Release date: 18 November 2005
- Running time: 101 minutes
- Country: Romania
- Language: Romanian

Femeia visurilor is a 2005 Romanian film directed by Dan Pița and starring Dan Condurache and Răzvan Vasilescu.

== Cast ==
- Dan Condurache as Thomas Alexandru
- Răzvan Vasilescu as Nene
- Adrian Pintea as Dr. Antim
- Cătălina Mustață as Noa
- Claudiu Bleonț as Fabian
- Eugen Cristea
- Florin Zamfirescu as Cratofil
- Ilinca Goia as Mania
- Irina Movilă as Vanda
- Marius Bodochi as Caius
- Olga Tudorache as Mother
- Vladimir Găitan as the ophthalmologist
- Gabriela Bobes
