= Andrew Winter =

Andrew Winter may refer to:

- Andrew Winter (artist) (1892–1958), Estonian-born American artist
- Andrew Winter (footballer), Scottish footballer
- Andrew Winter (real estate), English-Australian property expert

== See also ==
- Andy Winter (disambiguation)
