= Hero Killers =

Hero Killers is an Eagle Award winning comic book written by Andy Winter and illustrated by Declan Shalvey. It was published by Moonface Press.

Hero Killers was voted Favourite British Black and White Comicbook of 2006 at the Eagle Awards at the 2007 Comic Expo in Bristol.
