= Gruber's Journey =

- Directed by: Radu Gabrea
- Written by: Alexandru Baciu, Răzvan Rădulescu
- Produced by: Radu Gabrea, László Kántor
- Cinematography: Dinu Tănase
- Edited by: Melania Oproiu
- Music by: Petru Margineanu
- Release date: 2008
- Running time: 100 minutes
- Countries: Romania, Hungary
- Languages: German, Romanian, Italian

Gruber's Journey or Călătoria lui Gruber is a 2008 Romanian drama film directed by Radu Gabrea. It is set in World War II during the Holocaust in Iași (Iași pogrom) and was shot on location in Bucharest. The film screened at the Third Annual Romanian Film Festival.

== Plot ==
The film centers on an Italian writer named Curzio Malaparte, who was a member of the Italian Fascist Party.

Malaparte is assigned to cover the Russian front for the Italian news service, and travels with Colonel Freitag of the Wehrmacht and the deputy commander of the local Romanian garrison to Romania. He has a serious allergy and is sent to consult world-class allergist, Dr. Josef Gruber in Iași, but Gruber is missing.

Suffering terribly from his allergy, Malaparte desperately seeks to find the doctor who has been captured. During his search for the doctor he encounters shocking situations in the Holocaust against the Jews in the city. He later writes a very critical account of the incident in his novel Kaputt.

== Cast ==
- Florin Piersic Jr. as Curzio Malaparte
- Marcel Iureș as Doctor Gruber
- Udo Schenk as Col. Freitag
- Claudiu Bleonț as Col. Niculescu-Coca
- Alexandru Bindea as Guido Sartori
- Răzvan Vasilescu as Stavarache
- Andi Vasluianu as Mircea
- Ionuț Grama as Consulate Driver
- Mihai Gruia Sandu as Dr. Anghel
- Dumitru-Paul Fălticeanu as Soldier
- Cristina Bodnărescu as Wome
- Trefi Alexandru as Soldier

== Production ==
In September 2007, scenes were shot at the North railway station in Suceava. The railway station was chosen by the filmmakers to appear in the film because its architecture was reminiscent of the period of the Second World War.
