= Declan Shalvey =

Irish comics artist and writer (born 1982)

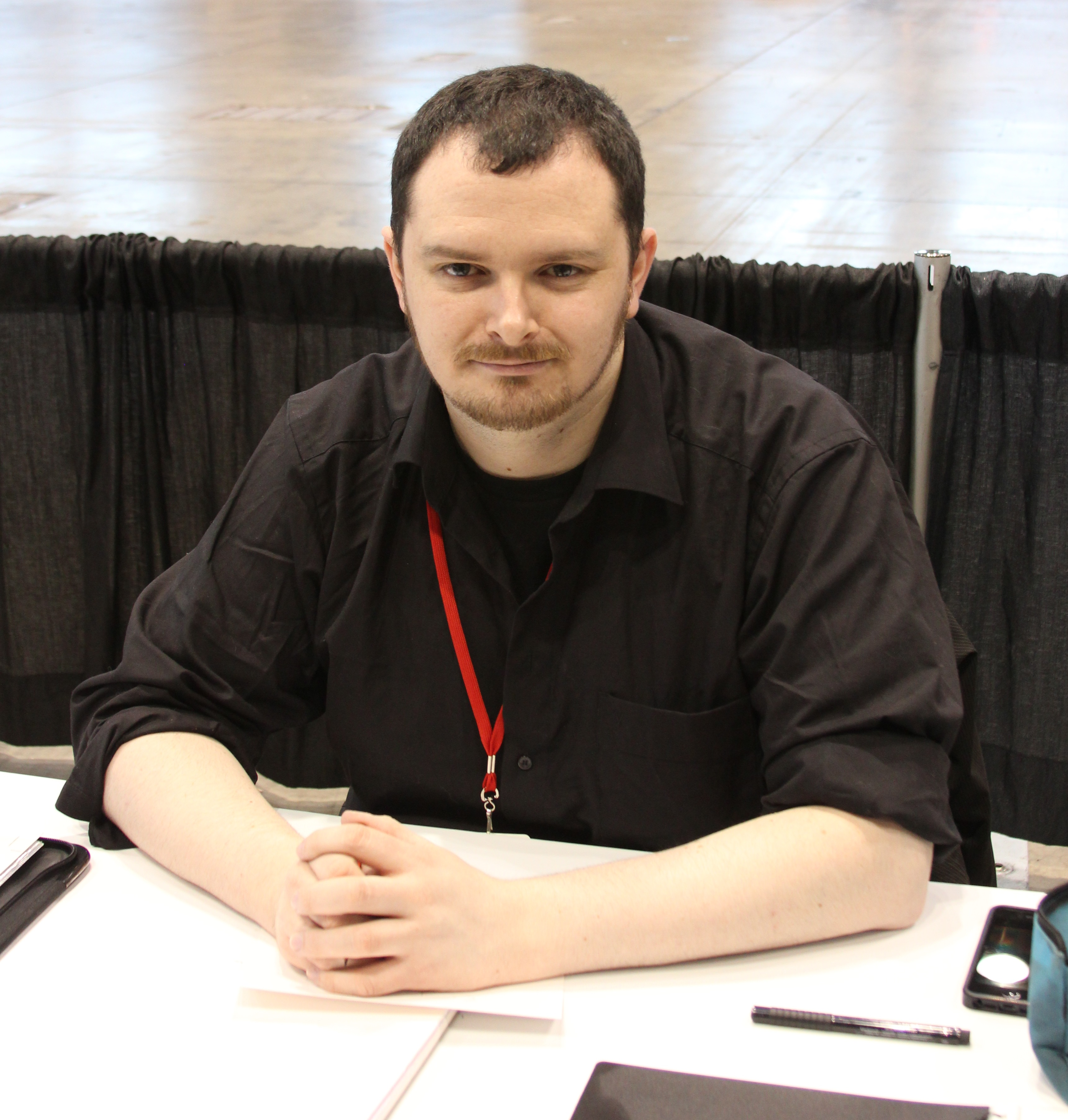
- Declan Shalvey at the C2E2, 26 April 2013
- Born: 11 January 1982 (age 44) Dublin, Ireland
- Areas: Writer, Artist
- Notable works: Injection; Hero Killers; Frankenstein; 28 Days Later
- Awards: 2007 Eagle Award

Declan Shalvey (born 11 January 1982) is an Irish comics artist and writer. He has worked for Marvel Comics, drawing titles like Moon Knight, Thunderbolts and Deadpool. For Image Comics, he has collaborated with writer Warren Ellis on science fiction series Injection, and written crime comics set in Ireland, including Savage Town, with artist Philip Barrett, and Bog Bodies, with artist Gavin Fullerton.

== Biography ==
Shalvey was born on 11 January 1982 in Dublin, and grew up in Ennis, County Clare, where he was educated at Rice College and St. Flannan's College secondary schools. He studied Fine Art Printmaking at Limerick School of Art and Design.

He started his career in independent comics in Ireland and the UK. He made his debut with the superhero comic Hero Killers, written by Andy Winter, which won an Eagle Award for "Favourite Black and White British Comicbook" in 2006. His small press work includes the Irish noir comic Freakshow, written by Rob Curley, which featured in the small press section of Judge Dredd Megazine, contributions to the anthologies Your Round Presents: Tequila, The Shiznit, and the Irish language comic Rí-Rá, and Tim Skinner: Total Scumbag, again with Andy Winter. In 2008 he illustrated a graphic novel adaptation of Mary Shelley's Frankenstein, written by Jason Cobley, and in 2012 an adaptation of Sweeney Todd, written by Scottish writer Sean Michael Wilson, both for Classical Comics He moved into American comics in 2009, drawing ten of the first twelve issues of Boom! Studios' film spin-off comic 28 Days Later, written by Michael Alan Nelson.

In September 2010 he did his first work for Marvel, and over the next decade he drew numerous series for them, including Thunderbolts (2010–12), Fear Itself (2011), Dark Avengers (2012), Venom (2012–13), Winter Soldier (2013), Deadpool (2013), Moon Knight (2014), Groot (2015), and Return of Wolverine (2018), and writing Civil War II: Choosing Sides (2016), and Deadpool vs. Old Man Logan (2017). In 2020 Marvel published Marvel Monograph: The Art of Declan Shalvey, a trade paperback collecting highlights of his work for the company.

For DC Comics, he has drawn Northlanders (2011–12), and contributed to the anthology series American Vampire (2013), All-Star Batman (2016) and Batman and the Signal (2018), and the graphic novel Mad Max: Fury Road Inspired Artists Deluxe Edition (2015). For Dark Horse Comics, he has drawn issues of Conan the Barbarian (2012–13) and The Massive (2013), and contributed to Dark Horse Presents (2014) and the graphic novel Murder Book (2015).

He collaborated with writer Warren Ellis on the creator-owned science fiction series Injection, which ran for 15 issues from Image Comics in 2015–17. He has also written two crime graphic novels set in Ireland, Savage Town, illustrated by Philip Barrett (2017), and Bog Bodies, illustrated by Gavin Fullerton (2020), both published by Image.

Shalvey along with Jordie Bellaire created the poster for the American TV series Agents of S.H.I.E.L.D. episode "One of Us".

== Bibliography ==
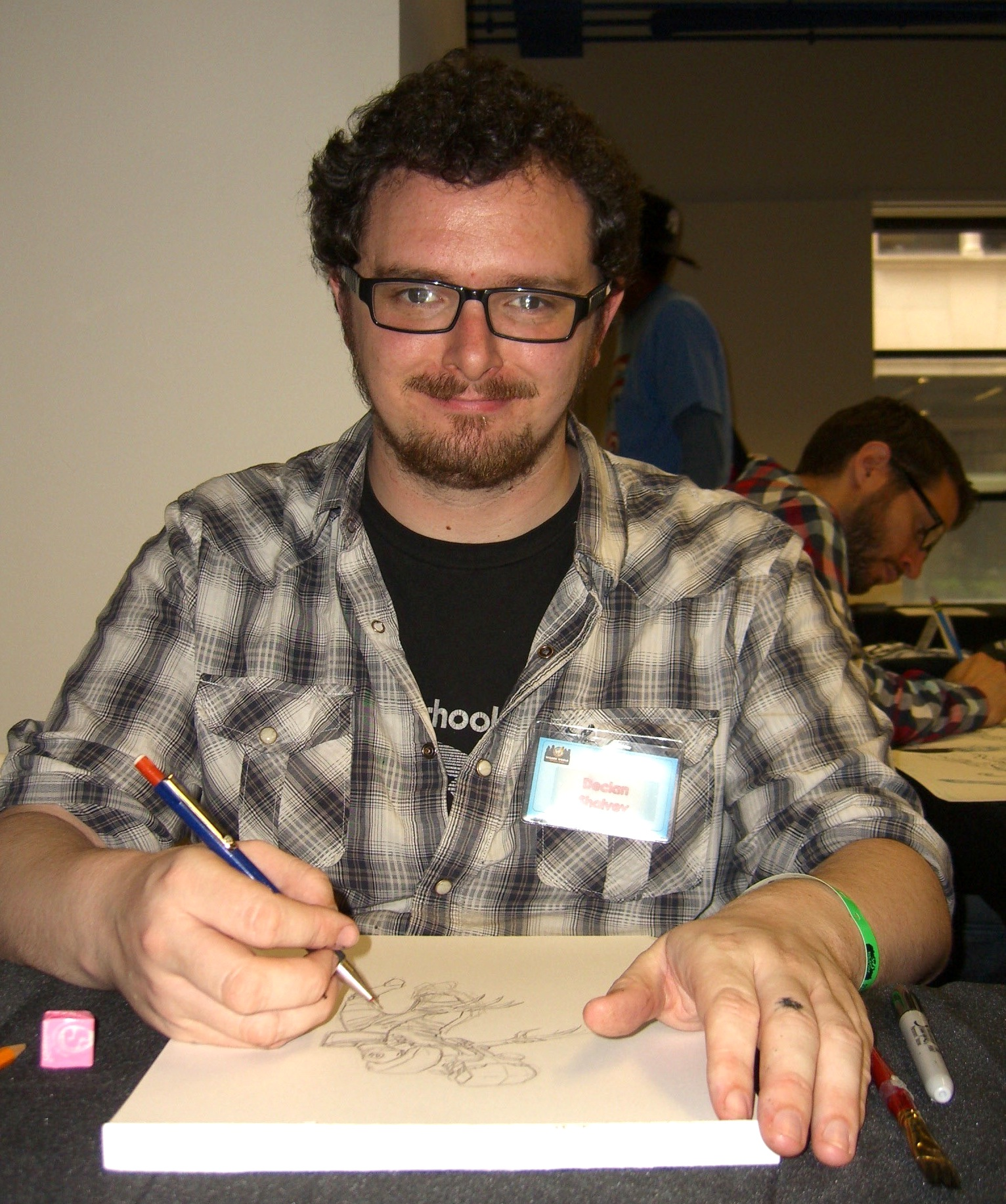
Shalvey drawing at the Big Apple Convention, 21 May 2011

=== Comics ===
- Hero Killers (with Andy Winter, one-shot, Moonface Press, 2006)
- "Freakshow: The Quiet Man" (with Rob Curley, in Judge Dredd Megazine No. 260, July 2007)
- Your Round Presents: Tequila (Olive Press, 2007)
- Frankenstein (with Jason Cobley, 144 pages, Classical Comics, September 2008 Original Text, ISBN 978-1-906332-15-0, Quick Text, ISBN 978-1-906332-16-7)
- Tim Skinner: Total Scumbag (with Andy Winter, Moonface Press, November 2008)
- 28 Days Later #1–4, 6–8, 10–12 (with Michael Alan Nelson, Boom! Studios, July 2009–February 2010)
- Thunderbolts #148–149 (with writer Jeff Parker, Marvel Comics, November–December 2010)
- Deadpool #15–19 (with writers Gerry Duggan and Brian Posehn, Marvel Comics, August–November 2013)
- Moon Knight (with writers Warren Ellis and Brian Wood, Marvel Comics, March 2014 – 2015)
- Injection (with writer Warren Ellis, Image Comics, 2015–present)

=== Illustrations ===
- 800 Years of Haunted Liverpool (by John Reppion, The History Press, 2008)

== Awards ==
- 2006: Won Hero Killers "Favourite British Black and White Comicbook" Eagle Award for Hero Killers
- 2010: Nominated for "Favourite Newcomer Artist" Eagle Award
