= 28 Days Later (comics) =

2009–2011 comic book series

- 28 Days Later #1 (July 2009); Cover by Tim Bradstreet

Publication information
- Publisher: BOOM! Studios
- Schedule: Monthly
- Format: Ongoing series
- Genre: Post-apocalyptic
- Publication date: July 2009 – June 2011
- No. of issues: 24
- Main character(s): Selena; Clint Harris

Creative team
- Created by: Danny Boyle
- Written by: Michael Alan Nelson
- Artist(s): Declan Shalvey (1-4, 6-8, 10-12); Malek Oleksicki (5); Leonardo Manco (9); Alejandro Aragon (13-16, 18-20, 22-24); Ron Salas (17); Pablo Peppino (21)
- Letterer: Ed Dukeshire
- Colorist: Nick Filardi
- Editor(s): Matt Gagnon; Ian Brill

28 Days Later is a comic book series published by BOOM! Studios, written by Michael Alan Nelson and drawn by Declan Shalvey and Alejandro Aragon.

The series follows on from the events of 28 Days Later, initially taking place in the gap between it and the sequel, 28 Weeks Later, much like the graphic novel 28 Days Later: The Aftermath, and as such references the upcoming American-led NATO occupation. Issues 22, 23 and 24 directly reference events from the second film, and takes place in the same time frame, ending with the Rage Virus spreading into continental Europe.

== Main characters ==
- Selena – One of the three survivors from the first film. Selena lives as a refugee in Norway.
- Clint Harris – An American reporter who learns that a U.S.-led NATO force will soon enter London to start the restoration process. In an effort to get the "whole" story, Clint plans on sneaking past the quarantine into infected London with his team with Selena as his guide.
- Derrick – An American cameraman reporter and Clint Harris' best friend.
- Captain Stiles – The main antagonist and a good friend of the late Major Henry West, from the first film.

== Collected editions ==
Title	ISBN	Release date	Collected material
28 Days Later Volume 1: London Calling	HC ISBN 1-60886-505-3; SC: ISBN 1-60886-622-X	March 23, 2010; September 7, 2010	28 Days Later #1-4.
28 Days Later Volume 2: Bend in the Road	SC: ISBN 1-60886-635-1	December 7, 2010	28 Days Later #5-8.
28 Days Later Volume 3: Hot Zone	SC: ISBN 1-60886-631-9	March 1, 2011	28 Days Later #9-12.
28 Days Later Volume 4: Gangwar	SC: ISBN 1-60886-650-5	June 7, 2011	28 Days Later #13-16.
28 Days Later Volume 5: Ghost Town	SC: ISBN 1-60886-651-3	September 6, 2011	28 Days Later #17-20.
28 Days Later Volume 6: Homecoming	SC: ISBN 1-60886-652-1	December, 2011	28 Days Later #21-24

== Plot ==
It has been two months since the Rage virus outbreak. At a refugee camp in Norway, Selena is visited by an American journalist named Clint Harris, who asks her to help him sneak through Britain's island-wide quarantine and act as his guide in London. After initially refusing, Selena reminisces about her life prior to the outbreak and decides to join Clint at his helicopter. Clint introduces her to the rest of his team: Derrick, Trina, Hirsch and Acorn. Selena and Derrick instantly dislike each other. Upon being attacked by an American aerial patrol, the group lands in the Shetland Islands. They soon discover that the infection has spread to Shetland from mainland Britain.

After fighting Infected at an abandoned hotel, the group drive a hot-wired van to Sumburgh, fortifying themselves in a pub. Selena and Derrick are able to sort out their differences over a drink and a game of Texas Hold'em poker. Unfortunately, Selena is forced to kill Hirsch when he is bitten by Infected, leading Trina, his lover, to hold a psychotic vendetta against her. As the pub is attacked, Trina bites Selena's arm in an unsuccessful bid to have her killed as an Infected. The group escapes the pub and are picked up by a contact on a boat, heading for Scotland. Trina, Acorn and the boat crew are killed when the boat is attacked by a U.S. fighter jet.

Selena and Clint are left to guide a blinded Derrick towards the shores of Scotland. As the former two set up a campfire, they discuss what to do with Derrick, since it would be difficult to get a blind person all the way to London. Derrick refuses to allow Selena to kill him, and she reluctantly agrees. In a flashback, we see Clint's initial efforts to cover the Rage pandemic during the original outbreak, during which he travelled to France and witnessed the U.S. military's human experimentation on terrorists with the Rage Virus, to find a cure, on the Isle of Wight, which was unaffected by the infection. Seeing the contagion's effects, Clint decided to approach Selena at the refugee camp.

Selena and Clint save Derrick from two oncoming Infected, and learn that despite claims and reports, some of the Infected in Scotland have not died off. They find cover in a village, where Derrick falls ill and the other two struggle to care for him. Selena once again tries to convince Clint to euthanize Derrick, but he refuses. The following night, a horde of Infected destroy their van. The damage being merely cosmetic, Selena, Clint and Derrick take off and run into a group of armed survivors led by a woman named Kate. Kate sends Selena and Clint to Halkirk to search for antibiotics in what she tells them is a pharmacy; however, it turns out that she sent them to recover her son, Douglas.

The three are captured by U.S. intelligence personnel, which experiments on Douglas with the Rage virus for the purpose of weaponizing it as a Super soldier program. Selena frees captured infected that kill all personnel, while they manage to escape as a forest fire nears the U.S. camp. After recovering Derrick, Selena and Clint commandeer a train in Inverness; Derrick, however, sacrifices himself to separate the cars with infected, from the engine. Travelling to Edinburgh, Selena and Clint discover that the survivors in the city are locked in a resource war with delinquents in Glasgow. After being captured, Selena is put in a cage, however, individuals from Glasgow free her and she and Clint escape as a turf war erupts.

Upon entering England, the pair are confronted by a Captain Stiles, a former British Army officer who seeks revenge against Selena for her role in the death of his commander, Major Henry West. After several close run-ins, Selena is captured and taken to Manchester; Clint is abandoned and is eventually found by the U.S. Army. Stiles takes Selena to the mansion which West and his troops had fortified and in which they had tortured her. He meets his death as he is tricked to walk across the lawn, which is laced with landmines. Selena is rescued by U.S. troops, who had been tipped off by Clint where Selena had been taken.

Selena and Clint are both taken to London, which is being repopulated by British refugees who had escaped during the first outbreak, under NATO supervision. Selena leaves shortly afterwards, sneaking out of the green zone to search for her former home. There, it is revealed her husband had been infected during the outbreak months earlier, forcing Selena to kill him. She finds her late husband's corpse and buries him, gaining some closure. Selena and Clint are eventually reunited as the infection once again breaks out in London, and successfully escape across to France via boat. They board a flight and depart to the United States to start a new life together, unaware that the virus has now spread to mainland Europe and a group of the Infected storm Paris.
