= Dan Condurache =

Romanian film actor

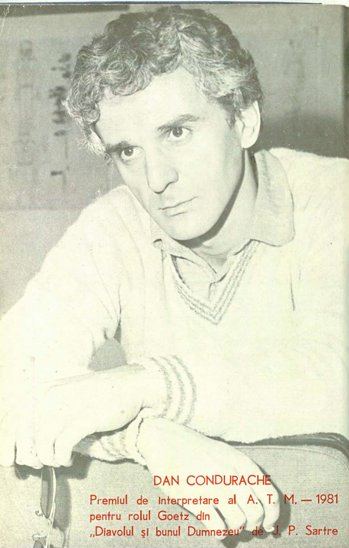
- Dan Condurache in 1981
- Born: 26 July 1952 (age 74); Dorohoi, Botoșani Region, Romanian People's Republic
- Education: Caragiale National University of Theatre and Film
- Occupation: Actor
- Years active: 1976–present

Dan Condurache (Romanian pronunciation: [ˈdan konduˈrake]; born 26 July 1952) is a Romanian film actor. He has appeared in more than fifty films since 1976.

Born in Dorohoi, he completed high school in his native city. He then went to Bucharest, where he studied theater at the I.L. Caragiale Institute of Theatre and Film Arts with Octavian Cotescu and Ovidiu Schumacher, graduating in 1975.

== Selected filmography ==
Film
Year	Title	Role	Notes
2015	Why Me?		
2008	Silent Wedding	Mardare	
2005	Femeia visurilor		
2001	Everyday God Kisses Us On The Mouth	Dumitru	
1997	Nekro		
1996	Semne în pustiu		
1995	State of Things		
1994	The Sleep of the Island		
1992	The Oak		
