= Ho Ho Ho (film) =

- Directed by: Jesus del Cerro
- Written by: Bogdan Mirica
- Produced by: Alma Sarbu; Patricia Poienaru
- Starring: Ştefan Bănică, Jr. Bogdan Iancu; Pavel Bartoș; Alina Chivulescu; Valentin Teodosiu; Costin Gabriel; Daniel Popescu; Ingrid Bisu
- Cinematography: Adrian Silisteanu
- Edited by: Ovidiu Vacaru
- Music by: Juan Carlos Cuello
- Production company: MediaPro Pictures
- Distributed by: MediaPro Distribution
- Release date: 20 November 2009
- Running time: 101 min.
- Country: Romania
- Language: Romanian

Ho Ho Ho is a Romanian Christmas-themed family comedy film starring Romanian music and TV icon Ştefan Bănică, Jr., directed by Jesus del Cerro, and produced by MediaPro Pictures as the first Romanian comedy film about Christmas.

== Background ==
Filming took place over a 4-week period in June and July 2009, at the Băneasa Shopping City Mall in Bucharest and at MediaPro Studios in Buftea and in Bucharest. Spanish director Jesus del Cerro also worked in Romania on the TV series One Step Ahead and on the television films The Countdown and The Countdown 2: No Escape.

== Plot ==
Horaţiu (Bogdan Iancu) is an 8-year-old boy who still believes in Santa Claus. As a Christmas gift, his mother (Alina Chivulescu) takes him to the mall to buy him a gift. What might otherwise have been a normal day becomes an adventure when Horaţiu gets lost. He meets Ion (Ştefan Bănică, Jr.), a thief disguised as Santa Claus who is there to steal a diamond for Vandame (Valentin Teodosiu) and his gang of fake Santas. Out of character for Santa Claus, Ion is rude and doesn't seem to like kids. However, the boy believes he is the real Santa and decides to stay with him despite Ion's attempts to abandon the boy. As the day goes on, the two enter a series of dangerous yet funny misadventures. By the end of the day they become great friends, both learning something from each other. And because it is Christmas and miracles do happen, everyone gets their wish.

== Main characters ==
=== Ion (Santa Claus) ===
Ion is a different type of Santa. Although, at first, he desperately tries to get rid of the kid, he eventually grows fond of Horaţiu as the boy is the only one who finds something good in him. Moreover, the boy helps him rediscover the magic of Christmas and makes him realize how much he misses his son and wife, who live in Italy.

=== Horaţiu ===
Despite being only 8 years old, Horaţiu is extremely smart for his age: he speaks English, has a passion for origami and rewrites all the books his mother bought for him. He is clever and always manages to find a creative way out of difficult situations. Raised only by his mother, Horaţiu is very optimistic and keeps on trusting Ion whom he believes is the real Santa. At the end of the day, Horaţiu discovers in Ion the friend he never had.

=== Carmen ===
She is a young, beautiful and intelligent woman who dedicated herself to raising Horaţiu. After noticing that Horaţiu is missing, she does everything within her power to find him. When she needs help the most, fate brings Marin into her life. Even though her first impression of him isn't one of the best, Carmen finds Marin to be a good man, a good friend and... more.

=== Marin ===
He is a mall bodyguard and the type of person that has seen too many B-rated action flicks. He falls head over heels for Carmen and wastes no effort in trying to help her find Horaţiu. By the end, Carmen gets to know his true personality and the two share a love story. Caring and big-hearted, Marin proves to have what it takes to be a father for Horaţiu.

== Partial cast ==
- Ştefan Bănică, Jr. as Ion / Mos Craciun
- Alina Chivulescu as Carmen
- Bogdan Iancu as Horaţiu
- Pavel Bartoș as Marin
- Valentin Teodosiu as Vandame
- Costin Gabriel as Calistrat
- Daniel Popescu as Sămânţă
- Iulia Lazăr as Gora
- Raluca Aprodu as Irina
- David Vasile as Ion's son
- Cătălin Măruță as TV host
- Emil Hossu as Ion's father

== See also ==
- List of Christmas films
