= Outbound (film) =

- Film poster
- Romanian: Periferic
- Directed by: Bogdan George Apetri
- Starring: Ana Ularu; Andi Vasluianu; Ingrid Bisu
- Release date: 10 August 2010 (LIFF)
- Running time: 87 minutes
- Country: Romania
- Language: Romanian

Outbound (Romanian: Periferic; lit. 'Peripheral') is a 2010 Romanian action film directed by Bogdan George Apetri.

== Plot ==
A drama about a woman who seems able to overcome everything for freedom, except for her past mistakes.

== Cast ==
- Ana Ularu – Matilda
- Andi Vasluianu – Andrei
- Ingrid Bisu – Selena
- Ioana Flora – Lavinia
- Mimi Brănescu – Paul
- Timotei Duma – Toma
- Ion Sapdaru – Virgil
