= Emil Hoștină =

Romanian film and television actor

- Born: Emil Hoștină; 31 May 1976 (age 50); Medgidia, Constanța, Romania
- Occupation: Actor
- Years active: 1993–present

Emil Hoștină (Romanian pronunciation: [eˈmil hoʃtinə]; born 31 May 1976) is a Romanian actor.

== Partial filmography ==
- 1993: Pro patria - Caporalul
- 1993: Cântarea cântărilor
- 1994: Pepi si Fifi - Manole
- 1996: Prea târziu
- 1998: Cortul
- 1999: Die letzte Station
- 2002: Amen. - Sergeant
- 2003: Vlad - Mircea
- 2003: Boudica - Arcon
- 2003: Examen - Lt. Major militie
- 2004: Paranoia 1.0 - Landlord
- 2004: Raport despre starea națiunii
- 2004: Italiencele - Fane
- 2006: What Means Motley? (2006) - Avram
- 2006: The Fall - Alexandria's Father / Bandit
- 2006: The Wind in the Willows (TV movie) - Mr. Tweed
- 2006: Catacombs - Henry
- 2006: Pumpkinhead: Ashes to Ashes - Lenny
- 2008: Silent Wedding - Runcu
- 2009: Anacondas: Trail of Blood (TV movie) - Eugene
- 2009: The Imaginarium of Doctor Parnassus - Serge
- 2009: Ondine - Vladic
- 2010: Made in Romania - Sorin Filipescu
- 2010: The Wolfman - Gypsy Man / Bear Handler
- 2010: Foyle's War - Alex Anokhov
- 2010: Bunraku - Follower #1
- 2010: Harry Potter and the Deathly Hallows – Part 1 - Death Eater
- 2011: Harry Potter and the Deathly Hallows – Part 2 - Death Eater
- 2013: The Zero Theorem - Slim Clone
- 2014: Utopia - Marius
- 2015: Fortitude - Yuri Lubimov
- 2016: Barbarians Rising - Attila
- 2016: Marcella - Bendek Krol
