= Malignant (2021 film) =

Film by James Wan

- Theatrical release poster
- Directed by: James Wan
- Screenplay by: Akela Cooper
- Story by: James Wan; Ingrid Bisu; Akela Cooper
- Produced by: James Wan; Michael Clear
- Starring: Annabelle Wallis; Maddie Hasson; George Young; Michole Briana White
- Cinematography: Michael Burgess
- Edited by: Kirk Morri
- Music by: Joseph Bishara
- Production companies: New Line Cinema; Atomic Monster; Starlight Media Inc.; My Entertainment Inc.
- Distributed by: Warner Bros. Pictures
- Release date: September 10, 2021
- Running time: 111 minutes
- Country: United States
- Language: English
- Budget: $40 million
- Box office: $34.9 million

Malignant is a 2021 American horror film directed by James Wan from a screenplay by Akela Cooper, based on a story by Wan, Ingrid Bisu, and Cooper. The film stars Annabelle Wallis as a woman who begins to have visions of people being murdered, only to realize the events are happening in real life. Maddie Hasson, George Young, Michole Briana White, and Jacqueline McKenzie also star.

Malignant was theatrically released in the United States on September 10, 2021, by Warner Bros. Pictures and was also available to stream on HBO Max. The film grossed $34 million, received positive reviews from critics and is considered a cult classic.

== Plot ==
In 1993, Dr. Florence Weaver and her colleagues Victor Fields and John Gregory treat a violent, disturbed patient named Gabriel at Simion Research Hospital. Gabriel, who is able to control electricity and broadcast his thoughts via speakers, escapes and kills several staff members. Weaver determines that he is a lost cause and states the "cancer" must be removed.

27 years later, Madison Mitchell returns to her Seattle home. During an argument about her multiple miscarriages, her abusive husband Derek smashes Madison's head against a wall, drawing blood. Madison locks herself in her room and has a nightmare of a person entering their house and murdering Derek. When Madison wakes up, she finds Derek's corpse before being knocked unconscious by an intruder. Madison awakens in a hospital where her sister Sydney tells her that her unborn baby did not survive. She is interviewed by police detective Kekoa Shaw and his partner Regina Moss, then let go. Madison reveals to Sydney that she was adopted by Sydney's mother at age eight and has no memories of her prior life. As the killer kidnaps a woman running a Seattle Underground tour, Madison's head wound continues bleeding. She has a vision of Weaver being brutally bludgeoned by the killer.

Shaw and Moss discover a photo of Madison as a child in Weaver's house and learn that Weaver specialized in reconstructive surgery. After a vision of Fields' murder, Madison and Sydney approach the police for help. The killer calls Madison, revealing himself to be Gabriel. Madison and Sydney visit their mother and learn that Gabriel was Madison's imaginary friend but may also be someone she knew before her adoption. Shaw finds a link between the doctors and Madison hidden in Weaver's records, leading him to discover the murder of Gregory. The detectives enlist a psychiatric hypnotherapist to unlock Madison's memories. Madison recalls that her birth name is Emily May and that Gabriel almost led her to kill Sydney while Sydney was still in her mother's womb. After Sydney was born, Madison forgot about Gabriel. The woman kidnapped earlier by Gabriel escapes and falls from the attic of Madison's home, revealing that Gabriel was secretly living there. Believing Madison to be the murderer, the police arrest her and place her in a holding cell. The kidnapped woman, Madison's biological mother Serena, is taken to a nearby hospital.

Sydney goes to the now-abandoned Simion Research Hospital and learns that Gabriel is Madison's parasitic twin brother who appeared as a half-formed child facing out of her back. Weaver surgically removed most of Gabriel's body, but could not destroy his brain without killing Madison. She resorted to sealing him inside Madison's cranium, where he remained dormant until the altercation with Derek. Once freed, Gabriel was able to take control of Madison's body to commit the murders. After being attacked by the other inmates in the holding cell, Gabriel takes over Madison's body. He kills the inmates and most of the precinct's officers before going to the hospital where Serena is recovering. He is intercepted by Sydney and Shaw but quickly immobilizes them. As Gabriel attempts to kill Sydney for replacing him in Madison's life, Madison wakes up and takes back control of her body. In a black mindscape, she subconsciously locks an enraged Gabriel behind bars and, after he promises to escape one day, says she will be ready. With his influence gone, Gabriel sinks back inside her head.

Back in the hospital, Madison lifts the bed pinning Sydney and remarks that even though they are not related by blood, she will always love her as a sister. Serena looks on with relief while the electric humming that accompanied Gabriel's attacks is faintly heard.

== Cast ==
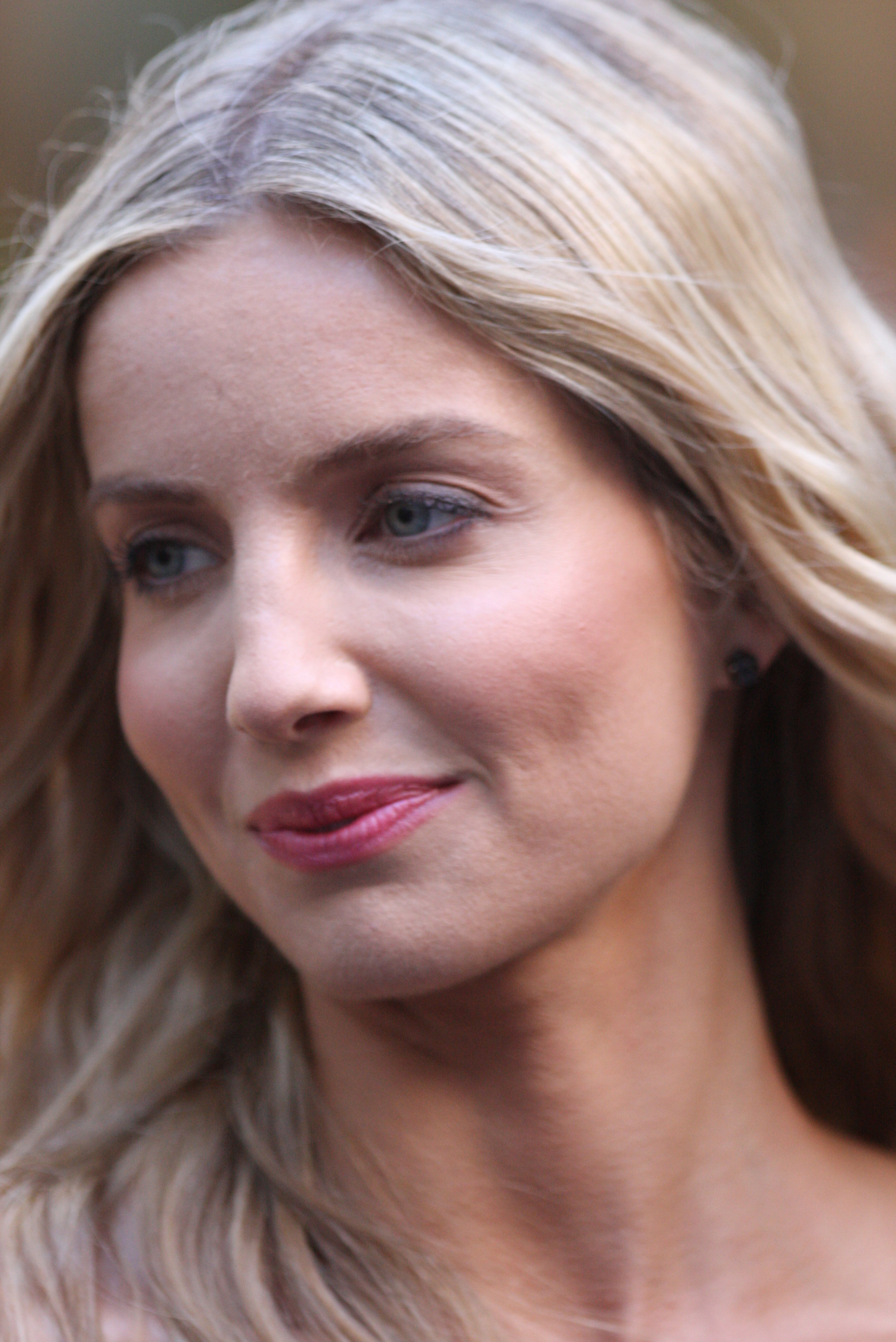
Annabelle Wallis stars as Madison Mitchell

- Annabelle Wallis as Madison Mitchell / Emily May
  - Mckenna Grace as young Emily
- Maddie Hasson as Sydney Lake, Madison's sister
- George Young as Kekoa Shaw, a Seattle Police Department (SPD) detective and Regina's partner
- Jacqueline McKenzie as Florence Weaver, the lead doctor that treated Gabriel
- Michole Briana White as Regina Moss, an SPD detective and Kekoa's partner
- Jake Abel as Derek Mitchell, Madison's abusive husband
- Ingrid Bisu as Winnie, an SPD crime scene technician (CST)
- Jean Louisa Kelly as Serena May, Madison's birth mother
  - Madison Wolfe as young Serena
- Susanna Thompson as Jeanne Lake, Madison's adoptive mother
- Christian Clemenson as Victor Fields, one of the doctors that treated Gabriel
- Amir Aboulela as John Gregory, one of the doctors that treated Gabriel
- Ruben Pla as Rubin, an SPD police officer
- Paula Marshall as Beverly, a psychiatric hypnotherapist
- Zoë Bell as Scorpion, an incarcerated woman who attacks Madison
- Dan Ramos as Basco, an SPD police sketch artist
- Shaunte Johnson as Beta, an incarcerated woman who attacks Madison
- Natalia Safran as Betty, a nurse
- Ray Chase (voice) and Marina Mazepa (physical performance) as Gabriel, Madison's parasitic twin brother
- Andy Bean as Frank Lake, Madison's adoptive father
- Patricia Velásquez as Velasquez, a nurse

== Production ==
=== Development ===
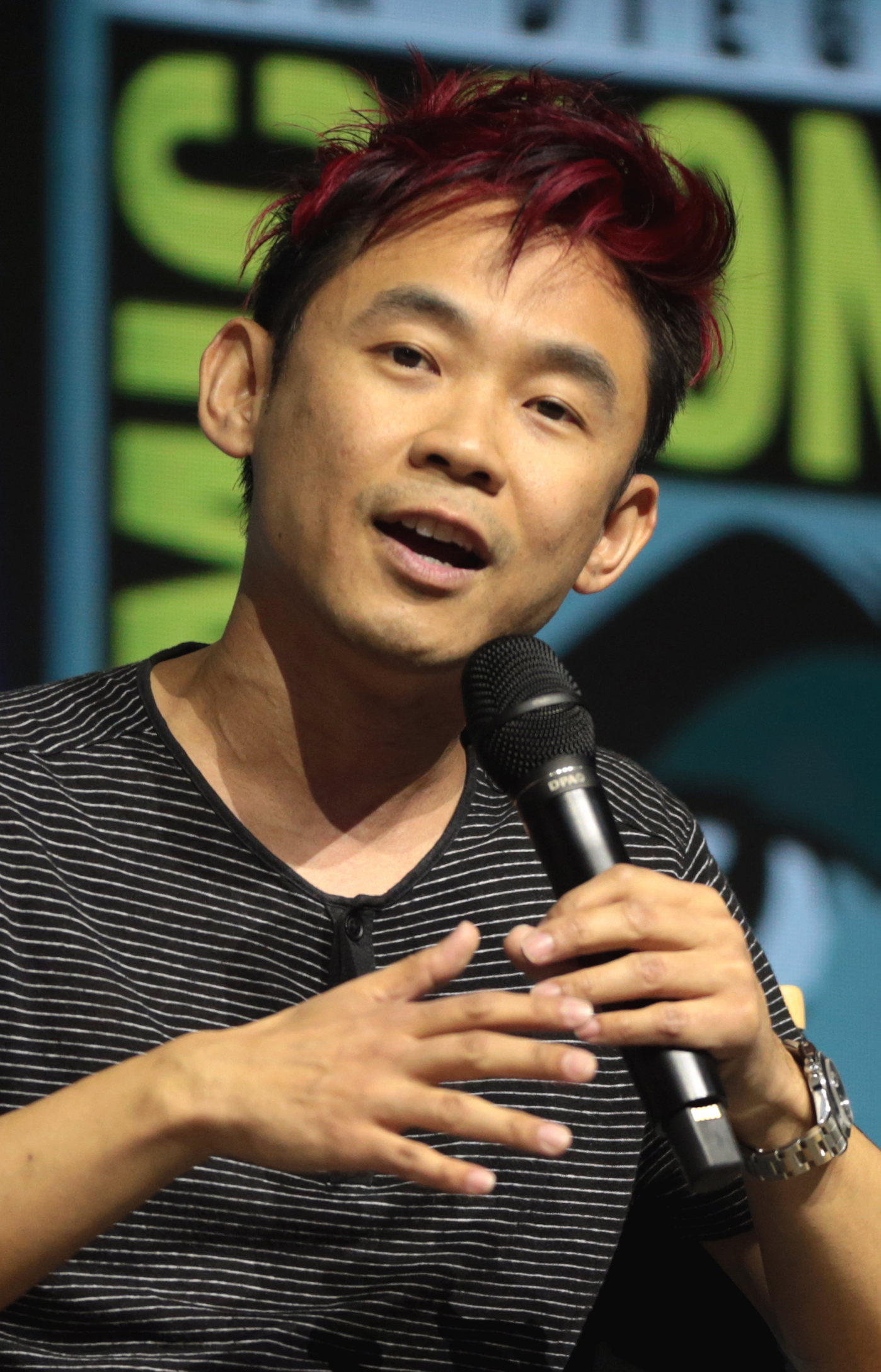
Director James Wan

In July 2019, it was announced that James Wan would direct the film at New Line Cinema from a screenplay by Akela Cooper and J. T. Petty, based on an original story he wrote alongside his wife Ingrid Bisu. Cooper ultimately received sole screenplay credit, with Wan, Bisu, and Cooper sharing "story by" billing; Wan served as a producer alongside Michael Clear under his Atomic Monster banner. That September, Wan officially revealed the title as Malignant, with Bloody Disgusting reporting the film would be in line with a giallo film. Bisu's fascination with medical anomalies led her to read about Edward Mordake, which inspired the Gabriel character.

On October 24, 2019, Wan clarified that the film is not based on his graphic novel Malignant Man, stating, "It's definitely not a superhero film [Malignant Man is a superhero]. Malignant is an original thriller not based off any existing IP." He cited the influence of Italian horror filmmaker Dario Argento, particularly his films Tenebrae (1982), Phenomena (1985), and Trauma (1993).

=== Casting ===
In August 2019, Annabelle Wallis, George Young, and Jake Abel were cast in the film. In September 2019, Maddie Hasson, Michole Briana White, and Jacqueline McKenzie were also added, as was Mckenna Grace in March 2020.

=== Filming ===
Production began in Los Angeles on September 24, 2019, and concluded on December 8.

== Release ==
Malignant was theatrically released in a few international markets (including France) on September 1, 2021, and then in the United States on September 10, distributed by Warner Bros. Pictures under the New Line Cinema banner. It was originally scheduled for release on August 14, 2020, but due to the COVID-19 pandemic, the film was removed from the release schedule in March 2020. As part of its plan for their 2021 films, Warner Bros. streamed Malignant simultaneously on HBO Max for one month, after which the film was removed until the normal home media release schedule period. The film was also released on VOD on October 22, 2021, and on Blu-ray and DVD on November 30, 2021. It was released on 4K on May 24, 2022.

== Reception ==
=== Audience viewership ===
According to Samba TV, the film was streamed by 753,000 U.S. households in its first weekend. By the end of its first month, the film had been watched in over 1.6 million U.S. households.

=== Box office ===
Malignant grossed $13.4 million in the United States and Canada, and $21.5 million in other territories, for a worldwide total of $34.9 million.

In the United States and Canada, Malignant was projected to gross $5–9 million from 3,500 theaters in its opening weekend. It made $2 million on its first day, and went on to debut to $5.6 million, finishing third at the box office. It dropped 51% to $2.7 million in its second weekend, finishing fifth.

=== Critical response ===
On review aggregator Rotten Tomatoes, the film has an approval rating of 76% based on 172 reviews, with an average rating of 6.3/10. The website's critics consensus reads, "Although Malignant isn't particularly scary, director James Wan's return to horror contains plenty of gory thrills—and a memorably bonkers twist." On Metacritic, the film has a weighted average score of 51 out of 100 based on 23 critics, indicating "mixed or average reviews". Audiences polled by CinemaScore gave the film an average grade of "C" on an A+ to F scale, while PostTrak reported 59% of audience members gave it a positive score, with 38% saying they would definitely recommend it.

Andrew Barker of Variety wrote, "It's hard to say whether a film this bonkers 'works' or not, but it's impossible not to admire both the craft and the extravagant bad taste behind its go-for-broke energy." Meagan Navarro of Bloody Disgusting rated the film 3.5 out of 5 and said, "It's silly, it's outrageous, and it's a blast." Josh Millican of Dread Central gave the film 4 out of 5 and called it "the best horror movie of the year." Michael Gingold of Rue Morgue described the film as having "WTF energy" but criticized the implausibility of the plot, saying, "Too often, it's hard to know whether Wan and co. are kidding or not." A.A. Dowd of The A.V. Club gave the film a grade of B, describing it as "a zany psychodramatic creepfest that, here and there, veers into gory action hilarity, as though Pazuzu had taken over the body of a Batman movie". Charles Bramesco of The Guardian gave the film a score of 3 out of 5 stars, writing: "around the midway point... the script shifts gears into an agreeable register of B-movie lunacy, but it takes too much of the nearly two-hour run time to get there".

Frank Scheck of The Hollywood Reporter was more critical, writing: "The film might have been outrageously bizarre fun if it displayed any humor or ironic self-consciousness, but everything is played so straight that viewers will find themselves laughing not with the film, but at it." Lindsey Bahr of the Associated Press gave the film a score of 1 out of 4 stars, describing it as "simply ridiculous" and writing: "If you must see Malignant, a theater might honestly be the best bet. That way at least you can laugh along in utter shock with your fellow theater-goers." Simon Abrams of RogerEbert.com also gave the film 1 out of 4 stars, describing it as "a horror movie that is as long as it is underwhelming."

Some critics suggested the film was intended as parody or self-parody. Ian Linn of Study Breaks wrote, "Malignant seems to take these tropes of Wan's earlier works to such extreme lengths it becomes difficult to see them as anything other than deliberate self-parody." Herpai Gergely of theGeek wrote, "Seeing Malignant, one almost wonders if, on the contrary, this joker is not knowingly laughing in the face of these new audiovisual actors. Indeed, everything in the film rhymes with parody."

About the reception, James Wan said:

I would tell people that knowing as little as possible about Malignant is the best way to go into the film. We were also very conscious about the trailer not giving too much away. I purposely wanted the movie to feel like you were coming into a typical James Wan-type horror film, only to then pull the rug out from underneath you toward the end of the movie. And that either turned people off or it made them completely reassess the film in a different light. So it got a very strong reaction.

The film ranks on Rotten Tomatoes' Best Horror Movies of 2021.

=== Plagiarism accusation ===
In 2022, filmmaker Adam Cosco filed a lawsuit against James Wan and Ingrid Bisu, claiming the film had plagiarized content from a screenplay he had written titled Little Brother, which he claimed they had previous access to.

Details of the lawsuits pointed out that both screenplays featured: "a twist that the protagonist has her twin brother absorbed inside her in the form of a malignant tumor, an inciting incident where the main female character is a victim of violence at the hands of a man that allows the twin to take over her body, and scenes of hypnotherapy in which the protagonist recalls repressed memories from childhood, among other things."

The lawsuit was eventually settled out of court in 2024, with details not disclosed.
