= Injection (comics) =

Image Comics series since 2015

- Cover of Injection #1

Publication information
- Publisher: Image Comics
- Format: Limited series
- Genre: see below
- Publication date: October 2015
- No. of issues: 15

Creative team
- Written by: Warren Ellis
- Artist(s): Declan Shalvey, Jordie Bellaire

Injection is an American comics ongoing series, created in 2015 by Warren Ellis and illustrated by Declan Shalvey and Jordie Bellaire, who previously collaborated on Ellis's Moon Knight run for Marvel Comics. The comic is high-concept science fiction fused with elements of magic and mythology, and also invokes British literary and pop cultural archetypes, such as Bernard Quatermass, Sherlock Holmes, Doctor Who, James Bond and Carnacki. The series has been optioned for television by Universal Cable Productions.

== Plot ==
A group of five highly specialized individuals are brought together by the British government to hypothesize about the future of human culture. Discovering the results, the group decide to act on it by creating an unusual artificial intelligence using a combination of technology and shamanistic magic, which makes its way into the world. The group, now disbanded, finds itself brought back together when the intelligence reemerges, creating specialized havoc that draws inspiration from mythology and superstition.

== Collected editions ==
Trade paperbacks
Title	Publication date	Material collected	ISBN
Injection – Volume One	Oct 7, 2015	Injection #1–5	978-1632154798
Injection – Volume Two	Aug 10, 2016	Injection #6–10	978-1632157201
Injection – Volume Three	Nov 29, 2017	Injection #11–15	978-1534302488
Deluxe hardcover editions
Title	Publication date	Material collected	ISBN
Injection – Volume One	Nov 14, 2018	Injection #1–15	978-1534308626
