= Malignant Man =

Graphic novel

Publication information
- Publisher: Boom! Studios
- Format: Limited series
- Publication date: April – August 2011
- No. of issues: 4

Creative team
- Created by: James Wan
- Written by: James Wan (story); Michael Alan Nelson (writer)
- Artist(s): Piotr Kowalski
- Letterer(s): Steve Wands
- Colorist(s): Jordie Bellaire
- Editor(s): Matt Gagnon

Collected editions
- Softcover: ISBN 978-1608860708

Malignant Man is a 2011 graphic novel by James Wan.

== Synopsis ==
Diagnosed with terminal cancer, Alan Gates is resigned to die, until he learns that his tumor is really a parasite. With a new lease on life and incredible, otherworldly powers, Alan must fight against an evil army buried beneath society's skin, all the while unlocking the secrets of his forgotten past.

== Film adaptation ==
In June 2014, 20th Century Fox acquired the rights to the comic and set James Wan to direct and produce the adaptation. In 2016, Brad Peyton signed on to direct the film with Wan still producing the film through his Atomic Monster banner. One year later, Rebecca Thomas replaced Peyton as director.

Wan would later clarify that his film Malignant was not based on the graphic novel despite the name similarities.
