= Everyday God Kisses Us On The Mouth =

2001 film directed by Sinişa Dragin

- În fiecare zi Dumnezeu ne sărută pe gură
- Directed by: Sinișa Dragin
- Screenplay by: Sinișa Dragin
- Story by: Ioan Cărmăzan
- Produced by: Dinu Tănase
- Starring: Ana Ciontea; Dan Condurache; Horațiu Mălăele
- Cinematography: Alexandru Solomon
- Edited by: Cristina Ionescu
- Music by: Marian Lupașcu
- Production company: Motion Films
- Distributed by: Româniafilm
- Release date: April 27, 2001 (Romania)
- Running time: 95 min.
- Country: Romania
- Language: Romanian

În fiecare zi Dumnezeu ne sărută pe gură (Everyday God Kisses Us On The Mouth) is a 2001 Romanian film directed by Sinișa Dragin and starring Ana Ciontea, Dan Condurache and Horațiu Mălăele.

== Cast ==
- Dan Condurache as Dumitru
- Ana Ciontea as Dumitru's Wife
- Antoaneta Zaharia
- Horațiu Mălăele as Milicia Officer
- Dan Aștilean as Dumitru's Brother
- Valer Dellakeza
- Cristina Tacoi
- Carmen Ungureanu
- Mirela Gorea
- George Alexandru
- Alexandru Bindea
- Tania Popa
- Elena Alexe
- Vicențiu Baniasz
- Mihai Brătilă
- Nicolae Bunea
- George Buznea
- Gabriel Costea
- Gheorghe Crăciunescu
- Dobre Crăciun
- Constantin Drăgănescu
- Elena Drăghici
- Mihail Dumitrescu
- Constantin Fărâmiță
- Constantin Ghiniță
- Doinița Ghițescu
- Marius Goicea
- Dobrin Grigorescu
- Carol Gruber
- Anica Gruianu
- Cosmin Șofron as The Thief
- Gabriel Spahiu as The Gambler
