= Călărași steel works =

Steel mill in Călărași, Romania

Coordinates: 44.2320°N 27.3013°E

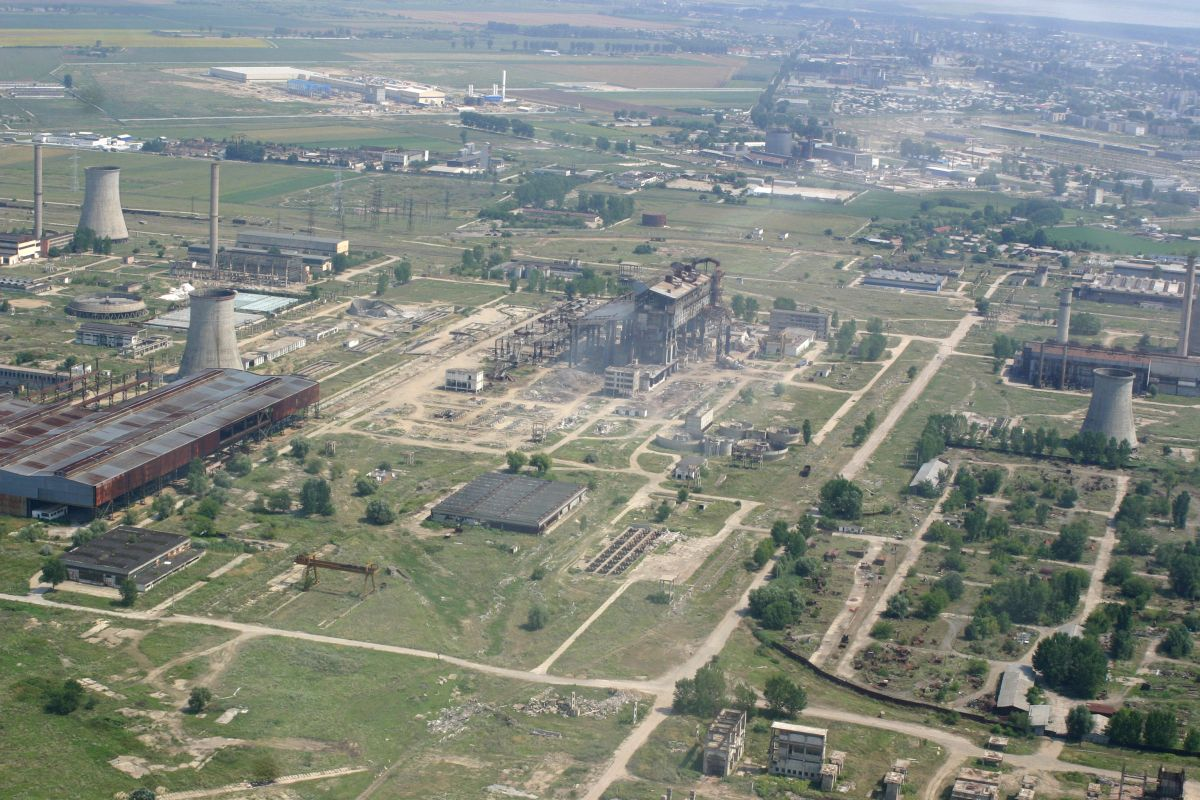
Ruins of the works

The Călărași steel works (Romanian: Combinatul Siderurgic Călărași), formally Donasid Călărași and formerly Siderca Călărași, is a steel mill in Călărași, Romania.

== History ==
=== Origins and growth under communism ===
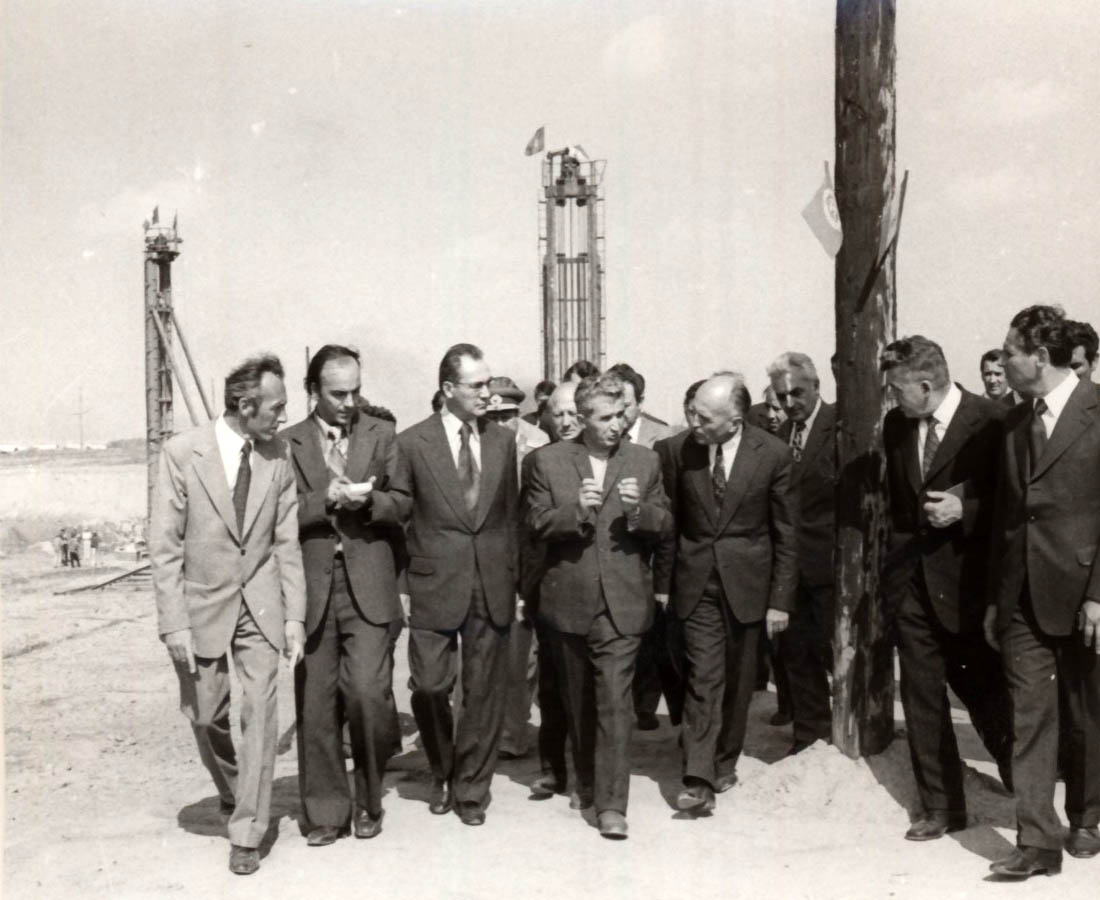
Ceaușescu visits the construction site in 1976

The genesis of the project took place during the communist regime on a July morning in 1974, when dictator Nicolae Ceaușescu, returning from a visit to Constanța, stopped at the garbage mound at the edge of Călărași and decided a steel mill would be built there. Plans were drawn up, construction being delayed the following year mainly due to floods. Final approval for the construction was secured in February 1976, by a decree of the State Council of Romania; production capacity was estimated at 10 million tons of steel per year.

The first stake was driven in March 1976, although building, engineered by IPROMET Bucharest, did not begin in earnest until 1978. A foreign loan totaling over $100 million was taken out, and the factory was inaugurated in 1979. Covering 650 hectares (1,600 acres) on the Borcea branch of the Danube, 6,000 workers were initially hired. These came from the area and the rest of the country, while experts were brought in from the works at Reșița, Galați, and Hunedoara. Work went on seven days a week, twelve hours a day; generous salaries were paid, as well as bonuses and overtime. Deputy Prime Minister Ion Dincă made frequent quick inspections.

A coking plant was ready in 1986, closing in 1998. Between 1981 and 1986, other units that came on board were the electric steel mill, the rolling mill for mid-sized products, the depot for raw materials and the iron ore enrichment facility. A 13 km-long canal was dug, complete with a port for use solely by the works. Its location in the Danube's immediate vicinity allowed for ore to be transported in and finished products out, as well as its waters to be used in the technical process. The blast furnace, the steel mill with converters and the rolling mill for heavy products and railway tracks were due to start production soon after the 1989 Revolution and fall of the regime halted work on them. By that year, the works were 90% ready, with $1.8 billion having been spent on them. There were 6,500 employees, their number set to rise to 15,000 once the project was complete. There were plans for producing cast iron, mid-sized products, products for the automobile industry and metal ties, with 30% of output for domestic use and the rest for export.

The foundry, among other components, was technologically advanced for its day, and the coke plant used high-quality coal from Poland, Brazil, China, and the Soviet Union. Steel ingots of 7 and 9 tons each rolled off the production line starting in 1979. During the 1980s, the factory was among Southeast Europe's largest for railway tracks, and it generated 200,000 tons of steel annually. Ceaușescu had even grander designs, wanting to raze Ceacu and Cuza Vodă villages some 8 km (5.0 mi) away. In their stead, he foresaw an expanded works producing record amounts of steel, but this did not come to pass.

During the 1980s, although equipped with a unit for purifying emissions, the works were lacking in environmental safeguards. A reddish dust settled on Călărași, and whenever a charge of steel was converted, the noise was loud. Local rumor suggests that a dispute over pollution arose with neighboring Bulgaria.

=== Struggles with privatization and thefts ===
The works became known as Siderca in 1990. During the years that followed, its viable parts were privatized, a process fraught with difficulty. At first, because of their uncompetitiveness, the works were subsidized from the state budget, becoming a "black hole" in the national economy. In 1993, the Red Quadrilateral government approved a $65 million investment for the steel mill. In 1996, eighteen domestic and foreign firms bid on the enterprise, but the authorities were unable to conclude the process; neither were they able to do so when three bidders appeared in 1998. Privatization, directed by the Authority for State Assets Recovery, cost the government at least $100 million and a lengthy series of infractions was committed during its course. The works ended up being sold at a nominal cost to an Italian group that, rather than make promised investments, went on to sell them to Tenaris.

In 1997, upgrades unique to Romania were made to the rolling mill and the electric steel mill, with parts imported from Germany, Austria, and Scotland. In 1999, steelmaking was halted due to lack of available capital, a situation that lasted until 2004, when production began anew at the country's only manufacturer of railway tracks. During this period, parts of the factory were dismantled piece by piece, with much of the 400,000 tons of metal used in its construction being sold as scrap. Reportedly, thefts went on day and night, with groups of scrap collectors from Călărași taking what they could. Firms for collecting scrap operated all around the factory perimeter, allegedly run by influential residents of the town who thus amassed significant wealth. The 600 km (370 mi) of internal railway were stripped bare, and finished products not yet unpacked are said to have gone directly to scrap. In the port, only twisted concrete was left, with even the iron from inside the poles removed.

In 2000, Siderca filed for bankruptcy, a procedure that was suspended in 2001 for four years, during which attempts were made to place the enterprise on a better footing. In 2003, Donasid took over the viable parts, evaluated at $20 million: the steel mill, the continuous casting unit, and the rolling mill for heavy products and railway tracks. Siderca contributed 150 ha (370 acres) and the administrative building. In 2005, Siderca re-entered bankruptcy, while Donasid was acquired by Tenaris. By 2011, 500 employees remained, of whom 300 in the steel mill and 70 in the rolling mill. The works were divided among four companies: Sidertrans, Martifer, Donalam, and the largest, Donasid.

A 2010 inspection found over 100 ha (250 acres) on the site suffering from soil contamination, with waste dumped directly on the surface. Additionally, the site was littered with concrete. When the factory was pulled apart by thieves, liquid toxic material had spilled out in uncontrolled fashion. Two locations were uncovered that had large deposits in sacks believed to be filled with pearlite. Surrounding water contained ammonia and benzene, which also damaged air quality.

In September 2020, the Donalam company announced that it would invest €11.3 million in the modernization of its rolling mill in Călărași. A new heating furnace and a water treatment system were planned; improved technology would contribute to reducing carbon emissions by up to 40%. The Donalam Călărași mill exports annually about 120,000 tons of steel bars to the European market. As of May 2021, the company had 270 employees, and was looking to hire 60 more, in order to meet growing international demand for steel products.

The ruins of the works and reminiscences of their heyday play a prominent role in the 2013 film Sunt o babă comunistă.
