= Fire and Ice: The Dragon Chronicles =

- Written by: Michael Konyves; Angela Mancus
- Directed by: Jean C. Comar
- Starring: Amy Acker; Tom Wisdom; John Rhys-Davies; Arnold Vosloo; Oana Pellea; Răzvan Vasilescu; Cabral Ibacka; Loredana Groza
- Theme music composer: Loredana Groza
- Country of origin: Romania
- Original language: English

Production
- Producers: MediaPro Pictures; Sci Fi
- Editor: Evan Jacobs
- Running time: 84 minutes
- Budget: $4 million

Original release
- Network: Sci Fi
- Release: September 18, 2008

Fire & Ice: The Dragon Chronicles is a 2008 fantasy action film by MediaPro Pictures and the Sci Fi Channel directed by Pitof.

The special effects and the CGI were entirely created in Romania.

== Premise ==
Ruled by King Augustin and Queen Remini, Carpia is a peaceful kingdom in a world inhabited by dragons and knights. When the King dies suddenly, the land's serenity is unexpectedly shattered by a Fire Dragon that spreads almighty fear and death amongst the kingdom's innocent people, especially against the Ice Dragon.

== Cast ==
- Amy Acker as Princess Luisa
- Tom Wisdom as Gabriel
- John Rhys-Davies as Sangimel
- Arnold Vosloo as King Augustin
- Oana Pellea as Queen Remini
- Răzvan Vasilescu as Paxian Ru
- Cabral Ibacka as Pontiero
- Ovidiu Niculescu as King Quilok
- Loredana Groza as Lila
