= The Japanese Dog =

2013 film

- Theatrical release poster
- Directed by: Tudor Cristian Jurgiu
- Written by: Ioan Antoci; Tudor Cristian Jurgiu
- Starring: Victor Rebengiuc
- Release dates: 12 October 2013 (Warsaw); 18 October 2013 (Romania)
- Running time: 86 minutes
- Country: Romania
- Languages: Romanian; Japanese

The Japanese Dog (Romanian: Câinele japonez) is a 2013 Romanian drama film directed by Tudor Cristian Jurgiu. It was selected as the Romanian entry for the Best Foreign Language Film at the 87th Academy Awards but was not nominated for the shortlist. It is Jurgiu's debut feature film.

== Plot ==
An elderly farmer, played by Victor Rebengiuc, has lost his wife in a flood. He has kept his wife's death hidden from their son, but his son discovers the truth anyway and rushes home to visit his father. Accompanying the son are his Japanese wife and their seven-year-old child. The farmer and his son become closer in the days that follow. However, sadness returns when they must part.

== Cast ==
- Victor Rebengiuc as Costache (the father)
- Șerban Pavlu as Ticu (the son)
- Ioana Abur as Gabi
- Alexandrina Halic as Leanca
- Constantin Drăgănescu
- Kana Hashimoto as Hiroko (the son's wife)

== See also ==
- List of submissions to the 87th Academy Awards for Best Foreign Language Film
- List of Romanian submissions for the Academy Award for Best Foreign Language Film
