= Constantin Drăgănescu =

Romanian actor (1936–2020)

- Born: 27 September 1936; Constanța, Romania
- Died: 26 March 2020 (aged 83); București, Romania
- Occupation: Actor
- Years active: 1972–2020

Constantin Drăgănescu (27 September 1936 – 26 March 2020) was a Romanian actor. He appeared in more than fifty films since 1972.

== Selected filmography ==
Year	Title	Role	Notes
1995	Dark Angel: The Ascent		
1997	The Man of the Day		
2001	Everyday God Kisses Us On The Mouth		
2001	Stuff and Dough	Ovidiu's father	
2002	Philanthropy		
2004	Italiencele		
2009	Regina	Dr. David	
2010	Iubire și Onoare	Marcel	
2013	The Japanese Dog		
2018	Pup-o, mă!	The old peasant	
2020	Otto Barbarul / Otto the Barbarian	Bubu	
