= Michael Alan Nelson =

American comic book writer and novelist

- Born: June 6, 1971 (age 55) Portage, Indiana, United States
- Area: Writer
- Notable works: 28 Days Later (comics); Supergirl; Day Men

Michael Alan Nelson (born June 6, 1971) is an American comic book writer and novelist. He is best known for the comic book and novel series Hexed, Supergirl comics, and co-writing the "Day Men" comics series. Nelson has written over 30 graphic novels.

Nelson has co-written a variety of graphic novels with notable collaborators from "Malignant Man" with film director James Wan to "Insurrection 3.6" with screenwriter Blake Masters to actor Peter Facinelli on "Protocol Orphans" to "The Last Reign: Kings of War" with Wild Hogs director Walt Becker.

Nelson has worked with some of the top comic book artists in the industry. His series "Day Men" features artwork by the illustrator Brian Stelfreeze. Illustrators such as Paul Pope (Hexed), Sean Phillips (28 Days Later), Tim Bradstreet (28 Days Later), and John Cassaday (Swordsmith Assassin) have generated covers for Nelson's series. Nelson's series also showcased artists that would go on to have high-profile careers such as Emma Rios (Pretty Deadly), Declan Shalvey, and Matteo Scalera (Black Science).

Nelson has written two series tapping world-famous classic pulp authors: his adaptation of Robert E. Howard's "Hawks of Outremer" and a modern spin on H.P. Lovecraft's Cthulhu Mythos in "Fall of Cthulhu".

== Awards ==
- 2004 New Times 55 Fiction contest for short-short "The Conspirators"
- 2011 Glyph Award: "Best Female Character": Selena from the series "28 Days Later (comics)".
- 2014 nomination "The Ghastly Awards" for "Best Archival Collection" for 28 Days Later (comics).

== Film adaptations ==
- October 22, 2012 The Hollywood Reporter announced that Paramount Pictures had picked up "Insurrection 3.6" for development as a feature film with Michael De Luca and Matt Tolmach producing.
- August 19, 2013 Deadline.com disclosed that Universal Pictures had acquired the rights to Day Men as a movie in "a pre-emptive seven-figure bid."
- On June 17, 2014 Deadline.com reported that Fox has picked up Malignant Man for film development with James Wan attached to direct. In August 2017, Rebecca Thomas was hired to direct the movie.
- On August 19, 2015 Deadline.com reported that Fox TV picked up "Protocol: Orphans" for development.

== Novel ==
- October 21, 2014 Pyr (publisher) announced the publication of a YA novel based on Nelson's comic book series Hexed: Hexed: Sisters of Witchdown (ISBN 978-1633880566). The Mary Sue website excerpted Chapter 2 of the novel on April 28 and Pyr released the novel on May 5, 2015.

== Short comics stories ==
- Cthulhu Tales short story "The Beach" (with Andrew Ritchie), BOOM! Studios, July 2006.
- Cthulhu Tales: The Rising short story "For You" (with Andrew Ritchie), BOOM! Studios, February 2007.
- Cthulhu Tales (ongoing series) #1 short story "The Farm" (with Sunder Raj), BOOM! Studios, March 2008.
- Cthulhu Tales (ongoing series) #5 short story "The Doorman" (with Milton Sobreiro), BOOM! Studios, July 2008.
- Fear the Dead one shot (with various artists), BOOM! Studios, April 2006.
- Ninja Tales short story, BOOM! Studios, January 2007.
- Pirate Tales short story, BOOM! Studios, April 2006.
- Zombie Tales short story "Severance" (with Joe Abraham), BOOM! Studios, June 2005.
- Zombie Tales: Oblivion short story "Riot Grrrl" (with Andy Kuhn), BOOM! Studios, October 2005.
- Zombie Tales: The Dead short story "The Miracle of Bethany" (with Lee Moder), BOOM! Studios, April 2006.

== Individual comic book issues ==
- Action Comics 23.1: Cyborg Superman one shot (with Mike Hawthorne), DC Comics, September 4, 2013.

== Collected editions ==
Title	ISBN	Release date	Collected material
28 Days Later Volume 1: London Calling	HC ISBN 1-60886-505-3; SC: ISBN 1-60886-622-X	March 23, 2010; September 7, 2010	28 Days Later #1-4.
28 Days Later Volume 2: Bend in the Road	SC: ISBN 1-60886-635-1	December 7, 2010	28 Days Later #5-8.
28 Days Later Volume 3: Hot Zone	SC: ISBN 1-60886-631-9	March 1, 2011	28 Days Later #9-12.
28 Days Later Volume 4: Gangwar	SC: ISBN 1-60886-650-5	June 7, 2011	28 Days Later #13-16.
28 Days Later Volume 5: Ghost Town	SC: ISBN 1-60886-651-3	September 6, 2011	28 Days Later #17-20.
28 Days Later Volume 6: Homecoming	SC: ISBN 1-60886-652-1	December, 2011	28 Days Later #21-24
28 Days Later Omnibus	SC: ISBN 978-1608863860	March 11, 2014	28 Days Later Volumes 1-6
The Calling: Cthulhu Chronicles	SC: ISBN 1-60886-652-1	March 2011	The Calling: Cthulhu Chronicles #1-4.
Day Men	SC: ISBN 978-1608863938	November 12, 2014	Day Men #1-4.
Day Men Pen and Ink	SC: ISBN	December 2013	Day Men #1 & #2.
Dead Run	SC: ISBN 978-1608860036	December 2009	Dear Run #1-4.
Dingo	SC: ISBN 978-1608860197	September 7, 2010	Dingo #1-4.
Dominion	SC: ISBN 978-1934506424	September 1, 2008	Dominion #1-5.
Fall of Cthulhu Volume 1: The Fugue	SC: ISBN 978-1934506196	March 11, 2008	Fall of Cthulhu #0-4.
Fall of Cthulhu Volume 2: The Gathering	SC: ISBN 978-1934506493	October 1, 2008	Fall of Cthulhu #5-8.
Fall of Cthulhu Volume 3: The Gray Man	SC: ISBN 978-1934506509	December 1, 2008	Fall of Cthulhu #9-12.
Fall of Cthulhu Volume 4: Godwar	SC: ISBN 978-1934506578	April 1, 2009	Fall of Cthulhu #13-16.
Fall of Cthulhu Volume 5: Apocalypse	SC: ISBN 978-1934506936	March 23, 2010	Fall of Cthulhu #17-20.
Fall of Cthulhu Volume 6: Nemesis	SC: ISBN 978-1934506943	March 23, 2010	Fall of Cthulhu: Nemesis #1-4.
Fall of Cthulhu Omnibus	SC: ISBN 978-1608864041	October 7, 2014	Fall of Cthulhu Volumes 1-6
Hexed	SC: ISBN 978-1934506776	March 9, 2010	Hexed #1-4.
The Last Reign: Kings of War	SC: ISBN 978-1934506929	March 23, 2010	The Last Reign: Kings of War #1-5.
Malignant Man	SC: ISBN 978-1608860708	January 3, 2012	Malignant Man #1-4.
Pale Horse	SC: ISBN 978-1608860371	March 1, 2011	Pale Horse #1-4.
Protocol: Orphans	SC: ISBN 1608864324	November 11, 2014	Protocol: Orphans #1-4.
The Ravagers Volume 2: Heavenly Destruction	SC: 978-1401243135	February 11, 2014	Ravagers #8-12 and 0.
Robert E. Howard's Hawks of Outremer	SC: ISBN 978-1608860418	February 1, 2011	Hawks of Outremer #1-4.
Second Wave Volume 1	SC: ISBN 978-1934506066	March 1, 2008	Second Wave #1-6.
Swordsmith Assassin	SC: ISBN 978-1608860074	August 2009	Swordsmith Assassin #1-4.
Supergirl: Volume 3: Sanctuary (The New 52)	SC: ISBN 978-1401243180	February 18, 2014	Supergirl (2011 5th series) #13-19.
Supergirl: Volume 4: Out of the Past (The New 52)	SC: ISBN 978-1401247003	July 22, 2014	Supergirl (2011 5th series) #21-26.
Valen: The Outcast Volume 1: Abomination	SC: ISBN 978-1608862573	July 2, 2012	Valen the Outcast #1-4.
Valen: The Outcast Volume 2	SC: ISBN 978-1608862849	December 11, 2012	Valen the Outcast #5-8.
X Isle	SC: ISBN 978-1934506097	November 1, 2007	X Isle #1-4.
Zombie Tales Volume 1	SC: ISBN 978-1934506028	September 1, 2007	Short stories "Severance" from "Zombie Tales" one shot, "Riot Grrl" from "Zombie Tales: Oblivion" and "The Miracle of Bethany" from "Zombie Tales: The Dead"
