= Nekro (film) =

- Directed by: Nicolas Masson
- Written by: Nicolas Masson; Viorel Mihalcea
- Produced by: Niki Coman
- Starring: Stefan Sileanu; Răzvan Vasilescu
- Cinematography: Marian Stanciu
- Edited by: Melania Oproiu
- Music by: Cornel Ionescu
- Distributed by: Romania Film
- Release date: 2 October 1997
- Running time: 103 min.
- Country: Romania
- Language: Romanian

Nekro is a 1997 Romanian thriller film directed by Nicolas Masson. It was written by Viorel Mihalcea and Nicolas Masson and produced by Niki Coman. The music for this film was written by Cornel Ionescu.

== Plot ==
Claiming to be inspired by actual, but never publicized facts, the story of Nekro is staged in mid-1980s Romania. Its basic building block is the eternal fight between God and Satan. Securitatea, the Communist Romanian secret police, takes notices of an illegal religious sect. David, a colonel serving with Securitatea, is assigned to eradicate the sect. He arrests the leader of the sect and subjects him to a series of sadistic interrogations. During the interrogations, David's mind blurs. He gets revelations from the World of Darkness, and starts acting as a man possessed by a demon. The leader of the sect vanishes from prison.

Diagnosed as a madman by a psychiatrist, David is dismissed from Securitatea. Eight years later, he senses the presence of his Master in the surroundings, but cannot locate him. He sees the former leader of the sect, who returned to Romania as a film producer, on the news. David has no doubt that he is his Master. However, as David was not cursed by God to be a Demon, he is able to gather the last of his strength and attempt to kill the Master. Consequently, David is arrested and taken by the police to a hospice.

As all these events unfold, several young women are murdered in Bucharest, the killings becoming breaking news. The psychiatrist who diagnosed David as madman, and who possesses psychic powers, has a vision of the next murder victim. He calls and leaves a message on her answering machine to warn her. The young woman is indeed killed. Looking for clues, the police search her residence and hear the psychiatrist's message. They talk to him, and the psychiatrist directs the detectives to David. The lieutenant in charge of the investigation knows that David cannot be the killer, as he was under surveillance at the hospice at the time the woman was murdered. The lieutenant suspects that they are dealing with a serial killer, as sex was performed on each corpse after the killing. What he does not know though, is that the sex acts were videotaped for commercial purpose.

David escapes from the hospice, and his daughter is kidnapped. His senses take him to a forest that spreads beyond the city limits, where his Master, the actual serial killer, performs the killing rituals. It turns out that he ordered the kidnapping of David's daughter, who is next on his list, but David's appearance in the forest has complicated plans. Eventually, David is ordered to force himself on his own daughter. Instead of doing so, he kills her, and then gets killed himself. Was David cursed by God to be a Demon? In the afterlife, David defeats the evil spirit, who reincarnated itself into the leader of the sect, and later into the film producer. Do God and Satan exist?

== Cast ==
(in alphabetical order)

- Dan Astileanu
- Aneta Bancu
- Zoltan Butuc
- Dan Condurache
- Constantin Cotimanis
- Iulia Gavril
- Roxana Guttman
- Ion Haiduc
- Rona Hartner
- George Ivaşcu
- Adrian Lapadat
- Nicolas Masson
- Stefan Sileanu
- Valentin Teodosiu
- Răzvan Vasilescu
