= Radu Gabrea =

Romanian film director

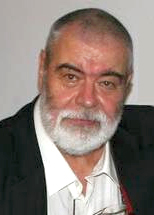
- Radu Gabrea in 2009
- Born: Radu Bartolomeu Gabrea; 20 June 1937; Bucharest, Romania
- Died: 9 February 2017 (aged 80); Bucharest, Romania
- Resting place: Bellu Cemetery, Bucharest
- Education: Technical University of Civil Engineering of Bucharest; I. L. Caragiale National University of Theatre and Film; UCLouvain
- Occupations: Film director, screenwriter
- Years active: 1969–2016
- Spouses: Roxana (Pană) Gabrea (divorced) Victoria Cociaș (before 2017)
- Children: 1
- Parents: Iosif Gabrea (father); Maria Lehrmann (mother)
- Awards: National Order of Faithful Service, Knight rank Order of Merit of the Federal Republic of Germany, Knight cross

Radu Bartolomeu Gabrea (20 June 1937 – 9 February 2017) was a Romanian film director and screenwriter. He directed more than twenty films between 1969 and 2016. He showed his first film in the Locarno Festival.

He was born in Bucharest, the son of Iosif Gabrea, a university professor, and Maria Lehrmann, a school teacher who came from a German family from Transylvania. Gabrea attended the city's Spiru Haret High School, and then enrolled in the Technical University of Civil Engineering, graduating in 1960. During that time, he participated in the Bucharest student movement of 1956; arrested and interrogated by the Securitate, he was detained for nine months, of which six were spent in solitary confinement. Starting in 1960, he worked as a construction engineer until 1963, when he decided to give up his engineering career to become a film director. He then studied at the I.L. Caragiale Institute of Theatre and Film Arts (IATC), in the film directing department; he graduated in 1968, and started working at the Bucharest Film Studio. In parallel, between 1965 and 1972, he carried out a remarkable publishing activity in the Cinema magazine.

Gabrea made his debut in 1970 with the movie Too Little for Such a Big War, based on a screenplay by Dumitru Radu Popescu. In 1973, he directed Beyond the Sands, a film adaptation of the novel The Angel Cried, by Fănuș Neagu; after a private viewing, the film was personally stopped by Nicolae Ceaușescu from being shown in Romanian cinemas. For a year, Gabrea fought unsuccessfully with the communist censorship for the release of the movie; nevertheless, he obtained a passport to go to Cannes to accompany his film, which had been selected in the "Quinzaine des Réalisateurs". There, he defected and went to West Germany, where he lived for the next two decades, working first as an engineer, and then returning to film directing with Fear Not, Jacob!, a free adaptation of Ion Luca Caragiale's short story O făclie de Paște. In 1983, he obtained a PhD in Social Communications from Université catholique de Louvain in Belgium, with thesis Werner Herzog et la mystique rhénane, which was published by L'Âge d'Homme in 1986.

After the Romanian Revolution of 1989, Gabrea returned to his native country, where he contributed to the relaunch of cinematography, through his significant activity as a director, screenwriter, producer, and organizer of cinematographic events. Between 1997 and 1999, he was the inaugural president of the National Cinematography Office (ONC), with the rank of secretary of state. On May 30, 2002, he was awarded by then-President Ion Iliescu the National Order of Faithful Service, Knight rank. On February 24, 2011, he was decorated with the Knight's Cross of the Order of Merit of the Federal Republic of Germany for his special contributions to German–Romanian cultural relations and the understanding of German–Romanian history.

With his first wife, film critic Roxana Gabrea (née Pană), he had a daughter, Maria Magdalena Schubert. He later remarried with actress Victoria Cociaș, whom he met at the filming of Rosenemil, and with whom he collaborated on numerous film and theater projects. He died in Bucharest in 2017, at age 79, and was buried in the city's Bellu Cemetery.

== Selected filmography ==
- Too Little for Such a Big War (1970)
- Bucharest Memories (1970)
- Urmărirea (1971, TV film)
- Un august în flăcări (1973, TV film)
- Beyond the Sands (1974)
- Fear Not, Jacob! (1981)
- A Man Like E.V.A. (1984)
- Ein Unding der Liebe (1988, TV film)
- The Secret of the Ice Cave (1989)
- Rosenemil (1993)
- Noro (2002)
- The Beheaded Rooster (2007)
- Gruber's Journey (2008)
- Red Gloves (2010)
- Trei zile până la Crăciun (2012)
- A Love Story, Lindenfeld (2014)
- Împărăteasa roșie. Viața și aventurile Anei Pauker (2016)
