= Valentin Teodosiu =

Romanian actor (born 1953)

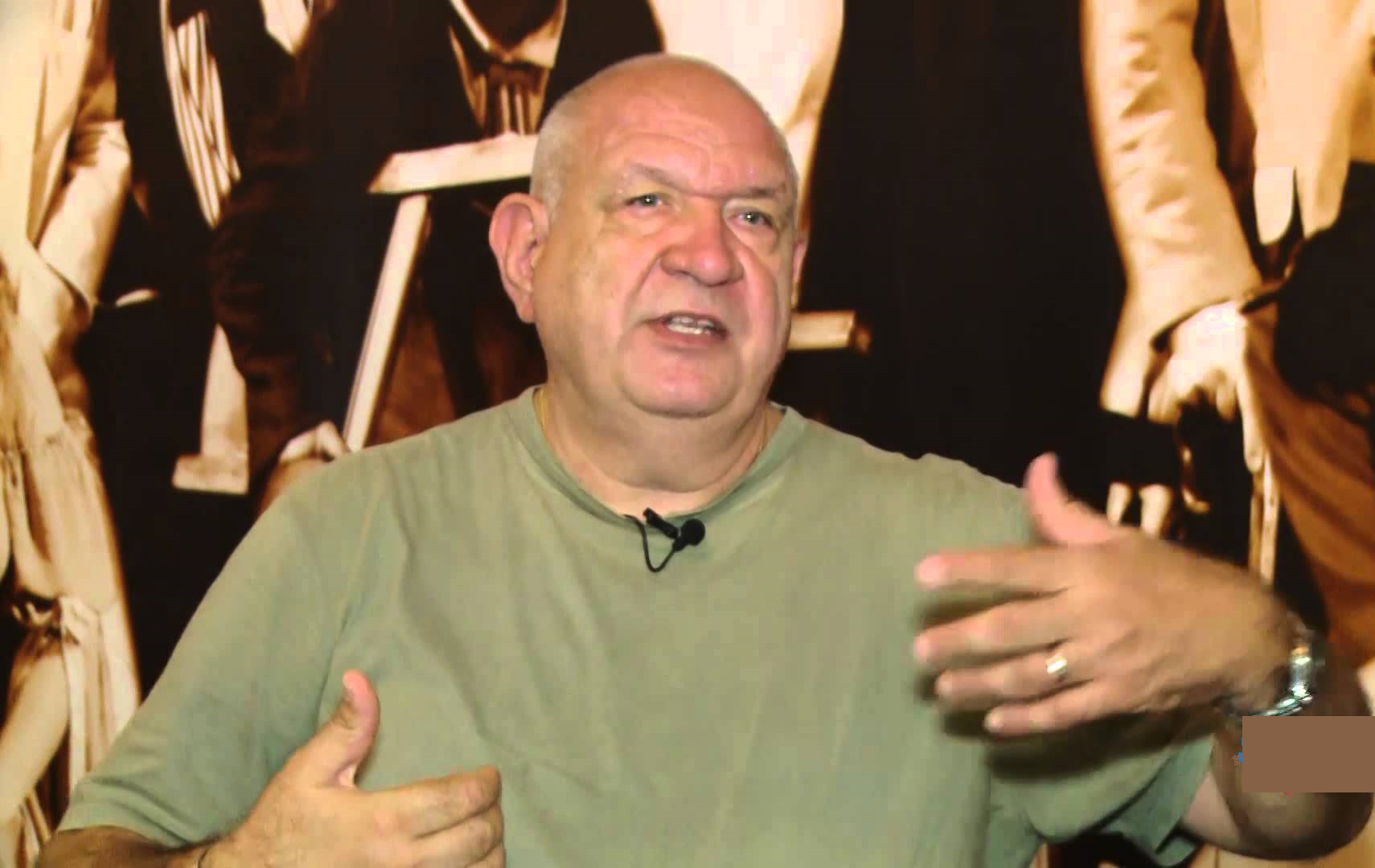
- Teodosiu in 2014
- Born: 17 September 1953 (age 72); Bucharest, Romania
- Education: I.L. Caragiale Institute of Theatre and Film Arts
- Occupation: Actor
- Years active: 1977–present

Valentin Teodosiu (Romanian pronunciation: [valenˈtin te.odoˈsi.u]; born 17 September 1953) is a Romanian actor. He appeared in more than fifty films since 1977. He is well known as the voice of channel ProTV since 1995.

Teodosiu was born in Bucharest and graduated in 1978 from the I.L. Caragiale Institute of Theatre and Film Arts. He was chosen by 20th Century Fox to dub in Romanian the Captain Gutt's voice for the animated movie, "Ice Age: Continental Drift", Sebastian in "Little Mermaid" animations and Anger in Inside Out production produced by Pixar .

== Selected filmography ==
Year	Title	Role	Notes
1989	Drumeț în calea lupilor	Nicolae Iorga	
1993	The Conjugal Bed		
1995	The Outpost		
1997	Nekro		
1999	The Famous Paparazzo		
2008	Vine poliția	Commissioner Albăstroiu	
2008	Silent Wedding		
2009	Ho Ho Ho	Vandamme	
2011	Assassination Games		
2018	Fructul oprit	Tavi Boască	
