= Andy Winter (comics) =

British comics writer

- Area: Writer
- Notable works: Hero Killers
- Awards: 2007 Eagle Award

Andy Winter is a British comics writer. He is best known for creating Hero Killers, with Declan Shalvey, which won the Eagle Award for "Favourite British Black and White Comicbook".

He largely publishes his work through his own Moonface Press.

== Bibliography ==
- Devilchild (Moonface Press):
  - Hell Is Round the Corner (with Natalie Sandells, Tim Twelves, Peet Clack and Tim Doe, 86 pages, May 2002, ISBN 0-9542739-0-7)
  - Freakshow (with Natalie Sandells, Sean Azzopardi, Tim Twelves, Duncan Nimmo and Phill Evans, 82 pages, May 2004, ISBN 0-9542739-1-5)
  - Heaven's Prisoners (with Keith Burns, Jason Dennis and Duane Leslie, 92 pages, July 2005, ISBN 0-9542739-2-3)
- Shriek! (with Natalie Sandells, Adrian Bamforth, Mikey Ball, Tim Twelves and Duane Leslie, Moonface Press, 2005)
- Hero Killers (with Declan Shalvey, one-shot, Moonface Press, 2006)
- Blood Psi (with Keith Burns, one-shot, Moonface Press, 2007)
- Septic Isle (with Mick Trimble, one-shot, Moonface Press, 2008)
- Brit Force (with Andy Radbourne, Moonface Press, 2008-ongoing)
- Brothers (with Andy Radbourne, 2008, forthcoming)

== Awards ==
- 2006: Won "Favourite British Black and White Comicbook" Eagle Award, for Hero Killers
