= MediaPro Pictures =

Romanian film and TV production company

MediaPro Pictures was the largest film and TV production company in Romania, part of MediaPro Entertainment along with other production units from Czech Republic, Croatia, Slovakia, Slovenia and Bulgaria. Since 2009, MediaPro Entertainment is part of CME (Central European Media Enterprises), a media and entertainment group, who operates broadcasting, internet and TV content companies.

The company received the “Un certain regard” prize in Cannes Film Festival for “California dreamin’ (endless)” and in June 2011 with the TIFF award for its short movie "Bora Bora". MediaPro Pictures is the first production company in Romania that produced a film for the American market, “Fire & Ice”, made for the TV station Sci Fi Channel. The latest cinema release is "The Godmother".

== Cinema content ==
- Ho Ho Ho 2: O loterie de familie (2012)
- Imagine (2014)
- Bora Bora (2011) TIFF Award Winner
- The Godmother (2011)
- Poker (2010)
- Ho Ho Ho (2009)
- Weeked with my Mother (2009)
- Carol, the 1st (2009)
- Roming (2007)
- Following Her (2007)
- California Dreamin' (endless) (2007) Cannes Film Festival Un Certain Regard Winner
- Tears of Love (2006)
- Three Loony Brothers (2006)
- Margo (2006)
- Woman of my Dreams (2005)
- Second Hand (2005)
- Alone vs Myself (2003)
- Philanthropy (2002)
- Garcea, The Dumbest Man on Earth (2001)

== TV content ==
- Comedy Intelligence Agency
- Land of Jokes
- In the Name of Honour
- The Heritage
- Aniela
- State of Romania
- The Countdown2: No Escape
- The Countdown
- Mothers and Doctors
- Little Angels
- Regina
- A Simple Movie
- Fire & Ice
- Gypsy Heart
- The Antechamber
- House Arrest
- The War of the Sexes
- Here Comes the Police!
- Daria, My Love
- One Step Ahead
- A Movie-like Romance
- At the Office
- Taca-Paca
- Poor Man, Rich Man
- The Immigrants
- Neighbors Forever
- Coupling
- The Sins of Eve
- Only Love
- Good Guys

== See also ==
- MediaPro Studios
