= Ana Ularu =

Romanian actress

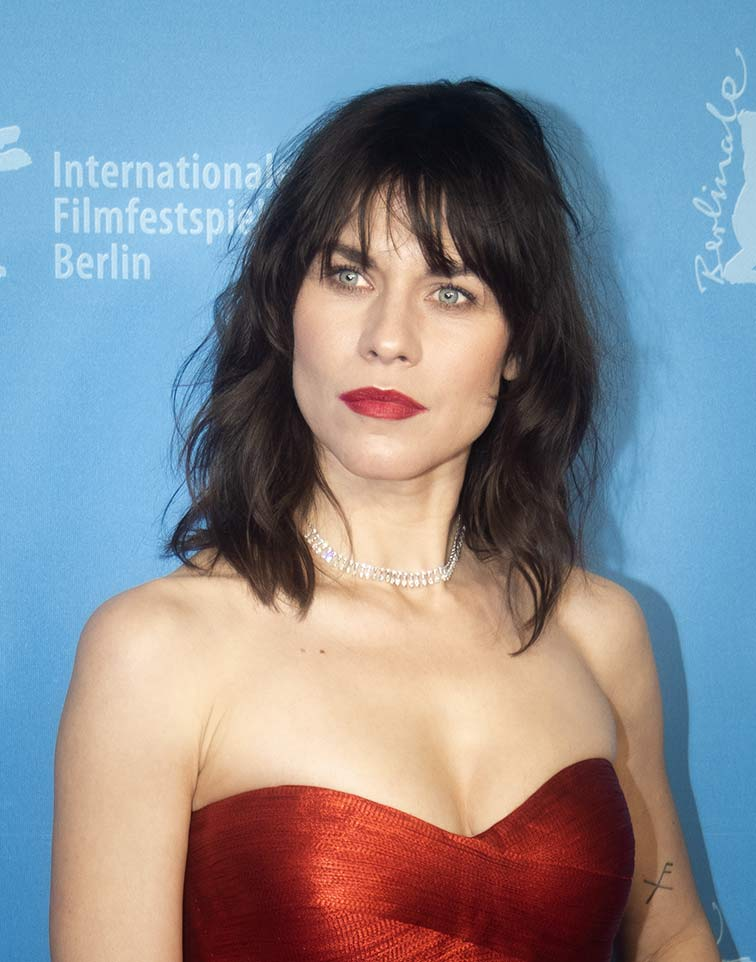
- Ana Ularu at the 2023 Berlinale
- Born: 26 June 1985 (age 41); Bucharest, Romania
- Education: Caragiale National University of Theatre and Film
- Occupation: Actress
- Years active: 1995–present
- Height: 1.64 m (5 ft 5 in)
- Spouse: Marc Rissmann (m. 2015)
- Children: 1
- Parent(s): Nicolae Ularu; Carmen Mihaela Trifu
- Awards: Gopo Award for Best Actress; UNITER Award for Best Actress in a Leading Part

Ana Ularu (born 26 June 1985) is a Romanian actress based in Germany.

== Biography ==
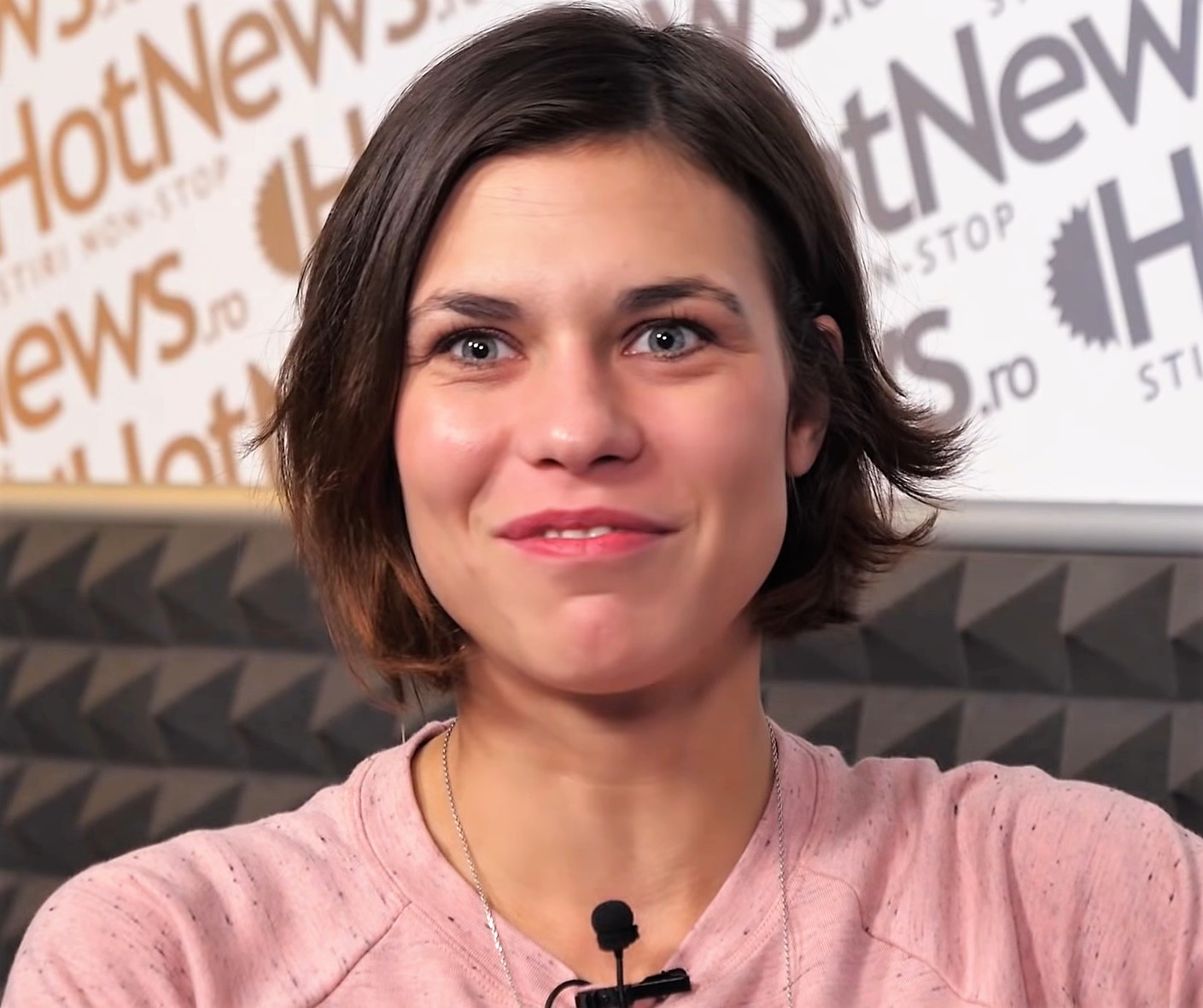
Ana Ularu in 2018

Born in Bucharest, daughter of Nicolae Ularu, theatre set designer and decorator, and wife Carmen Mihaela Trifu, theatre costume designer, she graduated with a BA and an MFA in Acting from the I. L. Caragiale National University of Theatre and Film in Bucharest. She was named a Shooting Star by European Film Promotion in 2012. She is known for playing the role of Matilda in Outbound and West in Emerald City (2017). She speaks Romanian, French, English and Spanish fluently. Ana Ularu has been married since 2015.

== Filmography ==
=== Film ===
Year	Title	Role	Notes
2003	Maria	Ioana	
2004	Damen tango	Mihaela	
2004	Italiencele	Lenuța	
2004	Magnatul	Dana Moraru	
2005	Lost and Found	Tatiana	
2005	București–Berlin	Ioana	short
2005	Concluzie	Maria	short
2006	Love Close-up	Anya	short
2006	Hârtia va fi albastră	Angela	
2007	Afterimage	Narrator	short
2010	Outbound	Matilda	
2012	Werewolf: The Beast Among Us	Kazia	
2012	Waste		short
2013	Sunt o babă comunistă	Alice	
2013	O vară foarte instabilă	Maria	
2014	Serena	Rachel	
2014	Index Zero	Eve	
2014	Camera Trap	Maddy	
2016	Inferno	Vayentha	
2016	Chosen	Judith	
2016	The Man Who Was Thursday	Saturday	
2017	Muse	Rachel	
2018	Siberia	Katya	
2020	Unidentified	Natalia Marcu	
2021	Miracle	Natalia Marcu	
2024	Ext. Masina. Noapte	Velica	Voice role
2024	Beyond Borders	Kate Owens	
2024	Ink Wash	Maia	
2025	Per amore di una donna	Yehudit	

=== Television ===
Year	Title	Role	Notes
1995	Passion Mortelle	Victoria	Television film
1995	Meurtres par procuration	Claudia	Television film
2007	Cu un pas înainte	Alexa Iacob	13 episodes
2009	Anacondas: Trail of Blood	Heather	Television film
2011	Life on Top	Clicky Chicks Advisor	Episode: "Ladies Night"
2013	The Borgias	Charlotte D'Albret	Episode: "The Wolf and the Lamb"
2017	Emerald City	West	Series regular
2020	Alex Rider	Eva Stellenbosch	Series regular
2021	Tribes of Europa	Grieta	Series regular
2022	Tom Clancy's Jack Ryan	Zoya Ivanova	2 episodes, Season 3
2023	The Power	Zoia	Recurring role
2023	Spy/Master	Carmen Popescu	Series regular
2023	Who Is Erin Carter?	Margot	3 episodes
2024	Paris Has Fallen	Freja	Series regular
2025	Andor	Beska	Episode: "Welcome to the Rebellion"

=== Awards and nominations ===
Year	Award	Nominated work	Category	Result
2010	Warsaw International Film Festival	Outbound	Special Mention	Won
2010	Thessaloniki International Film Festival	Outbound	Best Actress	Won
2010	Locarno International Film Festival	Outbound	Best Actress	Won
2012	Romanian Union of Filmmakers	Outbound	Best Actress	Won
2012	Gopo Awards	Outbound	Best Actress in a Leading Role	Won
2012	Berlin International Film Festival		Shooting Stars Award	Won
2014	Gopos Awards	O vară foarte instabilă	Best Actress in a Leading Role	Nominated
