= Periferic =

Periferic is an international biennial of contemporary art initiated in 1997 as a performance festival by the Romanian artist Matei Bejenaru. It is organized in Iaşi, Romania by the Vector Association, and takes its name from the "centre-periphery" relationship that it seeks to explore. Eight editions have taken place thus far.
