= U Get What U Kiss =

2018 Romanian comedy film

- Film poster
- Romanian: Pup-o, mă!
- Directed by: Camelia Popa
- Produced by: Alin Panc; Alexandru Pop
- Starring: Alexandru Pop; Cosmin Seleși; Alin Panc; Ioana Grama; Constantin Cotimanis; Constantin Drăgănescu; Mărioara Sterian; Vladimir Găitan; Eugenia Maci
- Release date: October 26, 2018 (Romania)
- Running time: 90 minutes
- Country: Romania
- Language: Romanian
- Box office: $93,036

U Get What U Kiss (Romanian: Pup-o, mă!, lit. 'Kiss her, you fool!') is a 2018 Romanian comedy film directed by Camelia Popa and starring Alexandru Pop, Cosmin Seleși, Alin Panc, Cătălina Grama, Mărioara Sterian, Constantin Drăgănescu, Vladimir Găitan, Eugenia Maci and Constantin Cotimanis.

The story takes place in the Transylvanian village Răchițele, Cluj County, on Wool Day, during which it is said that any celibate man kissing an unmarried woman will take her as his wife. Brothers Tică (Panc) and Horică (Pop), lifelong shepherds at a nearby sheepfold, try to take advantage of the situation when reporters Doina (Grama) and Ela's (Alexa Tofan) car breaks down outside their household; they use their amnesic fellow shepherd and younger brother Bică (Seleși) to create a story about a local strigoi, while trying to hide everything from their restrictive employer Minteuan (Cotimanis).

U Get What U Kiss became the third highest-grossing Romanian film of 2018 in its country, gaining over $93,000.
