= Sinișa Dragin =

Serbian-Romanian film director

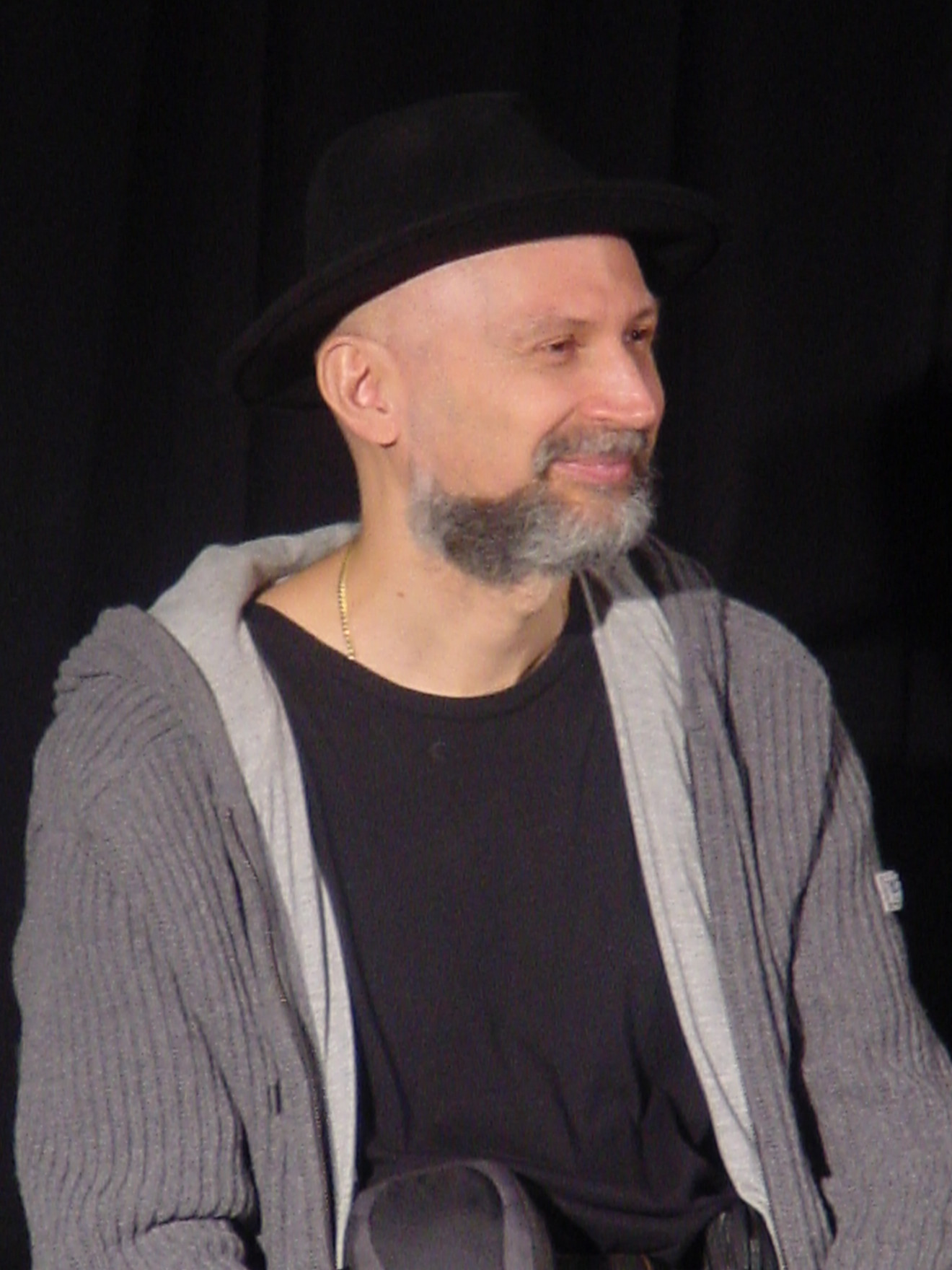
Sinișa Dragin at the Tokyo International Film Festival 2010

Sinișa Dragin (Serbian: Siniša Dragin, born February 6, 1960) is a Serbian-Romanian film director.

== Biography ==
He was born in Kula, Vojvodina, Serbia. In 2002, his movie Everyday God Kisses Us On The Mouth (În fiecare zi Dumnezeu ne săruta pe gură) won the 'Aleksandar Sasa Petrovic' plaque at the ninth Belgrade International Festival of Auteur Films. His latest film is a documentary one, The Forest, which won the most innovative feature film award at Visions du Réel film festival at Nyon, Switzerland and the European Documentary Network award at the Sarajevo film festival in 2014.

Dragin graduated from the Academy of Theatre and Film, Bucharest in 1991 and has worked since then as a cameraman for Reuters. Due to his immediate contact with contemporary stories, Dragin headed at first towards documentaries, filming two shorts, The Sorrow of Black Gold (1994) and Burning is the Sun over Tichilești (1995). In 1995 he distinguished himself also by the short feature The Rain, which won an APTR award (The Romanian Association of Television Professionals), a Prix Italia and the Directing Award in Costinești. The first feature film for television, Long journey by train, got him several screenplay awards and the main APTR award, in 1998. His second film, Everyday God Kisses Us On The Mouth, won three directing awards and the Tiger at the International Film Festival Rotterdam. He went back there in 2011 with If the Seed doesn't Die, winning the Dioraphte award, decided by the public among the movies financed by Hubert Bals Fund. In recent years, he returned to documentary, directing along with Alina Mungiu Pippidi Where Europe Ends (2009), while a third action film, The Pharaoh (2004) was starring in the leading role one of the most impressive Romanian actors, Ștefan Iordache.

== Awards ==
- The Sorrow of Black Gold (1994, short feature, documentary)
  - 1994, Grand Prize in Oberhausen, Germany
  - 1994, German Ministry of Environment's award
  - 1994, Public's special mention, Leipzig, Germany
  - 1998, Grand Prize, Las Palmas, Canary Islands
- The Rain (1995, short feature, fiction)
  - 1996, Directing Award, Costinești, Romania
  - 1997, Best short fiction feature; Ravenna, Italy (Prix Italia)
  - 1998, APTR award for Best Short Feature; Bucharest, Romania
- Long Journey by Train (1997, long feature, fiction)
  - 1997, Grand European Award for TV Screenplay; Geneva, Switzerland
  - 1998, Best Screenplay award, Vrnjacka Banja, Yugoslavia
  - 1998, Jury's special mention, Strasbourg, France
  - 1998, Jury's special mention, Dijon, France
  - 1999, APTR Grand Award, Bucharest, Romania
  - 1999, Grand award, Bar, Yugoslavia
- Everyday God Kisses Us On The Mouth (2001, long feature, fiction)
  - 2001, Best Director and Jury's special award (Sylver Pyramid), Cairo, Egypt
  - 2002, The Tiger Award, Rotterdam, The Netherlands
  - 2002, Best Director award - UCIN, Bucharest, Romania
  - 2002, Best Director Award, Alba, Italy
  - 2002, Best Film Award, Belgrad, Yugoslavia
- If the Seed Doesn't Die (2010, long feature, fiction)
  - 2011, Dioraphte award, given by the public to a movie supported by Hubert Bals Fund
- The Forest
  - 2014, The Most Innovative Feature Film Award, Nyon, Switzerland
  - 2014, European Documentary Film Network Award, Sarajevo, Bosnia & Herzegovina
