= Ituʻtiʻu =

District of Rotuma, Fiji

Coordinates: 12°30′31″S 177°02′21″E

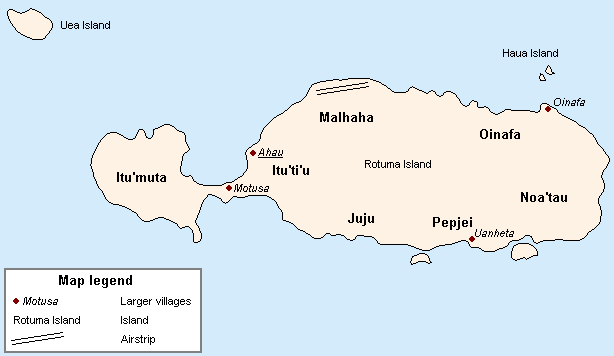
Map showing districts of Rotuma

Ituʻtiʻu is one of the seven districts on the island of Rotuma, a dependency of Fiji. According to the 2017 census, the district had a population of 660 inhabitants.

Rotuma's capital, the village of Ahau, is located in this district. It also includes the villages of Savlei, Lau, Feavai, Tuakoi, Motusa, Ropure, Melsaʻa, and Losa.

Ituʻtiʻu is the largest district by area and by population. Its name means "Big District" in the Rotuman language, and is traditionally ranked third in terms of chiefly precedence, determined by consumption order in the politically charged kava ceremony. This was determined by its successful allegiance in the Rotuman Religious Wars between the Roman Catholic districts of Juju and Pepjei, (collectively referred to as Faguta), against the predominantly Wesleyan districts alliance, led by the chiefs of Noaʻtau, Oinafa, Malhaha, Ituʻmuta and Ituʻtiʻu.

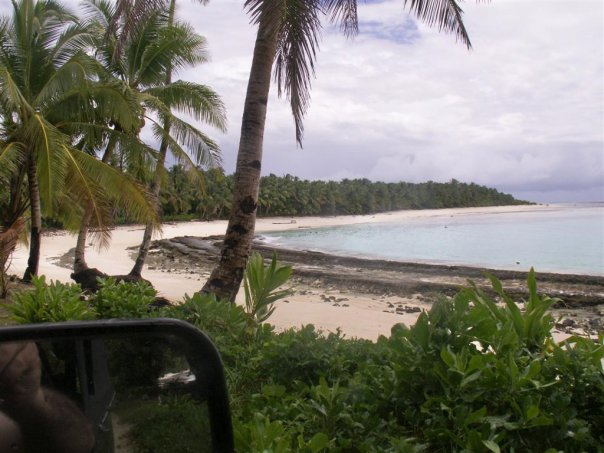
Mofmanu Beach, the popular main beach adjacent to the village of Motusa
