= Wilson Inia =

Fijian educator and politician

Wilson Inia MBE JP
- Inia in 1938

Member of the Senate
- In office 1970–1983

Personal details
- Born: 2 October 1908 Motusa, Fiji
- Died: 25 August 1983 (aged 74) Suva, Fiji

Wilson Fagamaniua Inia (2 October 1908 – 25 August 1983) was a Fijian educator and politician. He was a member of the Senate from 1970 until his death.

== Biography ==
Inia was born in Motusa, Rotuma in 1908, the son of a Methodist minister. He was educated at the Jubilee School and Marist Brothers School in Suva, before returning to Rotuma aged 12 to continue his education at the missionary school in Tia. Two years later he transferred to Davuilevu Boys School. After leaving the Boys School, he attended Davuilevu Teacher's Training Institute, qualifying as a teacher at the age of 16. He initially worked at Vuli Levu school, before returning to Davuilevu Boys School as a teacher in 1925. In 1931 he began teaching English, hygiene and mathematics at the Institute.

Inia worked in Australia as a Methodist preacher in 1938 and 1939. He subsequently returned to the Institute, where he remained until 1946. In 1947 he married Elizabeth Kafonika and was appointed headteacher of Richmond School in Kadavu. In the same year he was also made a justice of the peace for the Southern District and became a member of the Fijian Methodist Synod.

In 1953 Inia returned to Rotuma when he was appointed headteacher of Malhaha School. Five years later he became head of Rotuma High School, which he had helped establish. After being awarded a British Council scholarship to study cooperatives in the United Kingdom in 1958, he became involved with the Rotuma Cooperative Association. He also taught bookkeeping for free to help the running of local cooperatives. He was awarded an MBE in the 1969 Birthday Honours.

Having been elected to the Council of Rotuma, in 1970 he was the council's nominee for the new Senate. He remained in office until his death in August 1983.
