= Hạfliua =

Islet in Rotuma, a dependency of Fiji

Native name: Hofliua Nickname: Split Island
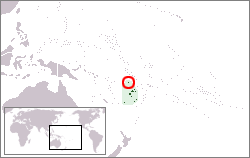
- Rotuma (dark green) in Fiji (light green)

- Location within Fiji

Geography
- Location: South Pacific Ocean
- Coordinates: 12.4969855°S 176.9332014°E
- Archipelago: Rotuma Group
- Area: 0.1 km^{2} (0.039 sq mi)
- Highest elevation: 58 m (190 ft)

Administration
- Fiji
- Division: Eastern
- Province: Rotuma
- Tikina: Ituʻtiʻu

Demographics
- Population: 0
- Ethnic groups: Rotuman

Additional information
- Time zone: FJT (UTC+12)
  - Summer (DST): FJST (UTC+13)

Hạfliua or Hofliua, also known as Split Island, is an islet which falls under the governing jurisdiction of the Fijian dependency of Rotuma.

The island is an important nesting site for sea birds. The seabird nesting colony contributes to its national significance as outlined in Fiji's Biodiversity Strategy and Action Plan.

== Geography ==
Hạfliua is the westernmost island of Rotuma Group, and about 0.1 square kilometres (0.039 sq mi) in area. It is a small, bare, rocky and cliffy islet, 58 metres (190 ft) high, located 5.6 kilometres (3.5 mi) southwest of Uea. It is the farthest southwest of the chain of islets, and has a remarkable, perpendicular cleft across it, which the sea passes through, a gully with vertical walls a few metres apart, although large enough for most small boats to pass through. Thus its alternate name Split Island. Caught between the two walls is a large boulder, lodged there for all recorded history.

Hạfliua also features some graves on its top surface. While the process must have been extremely difficult for the relatives attempting to move the dead up such a steep cliff for burial, the very process was undertaken for the protection of the bodies, and the effort involved was considered indicative of the love or esteem held for the deceased.

== Mythology ==
Legend has it that a hermit crab challenged a mighty swordfish to a race from Tonga to Rotuma, the swordfish thinking he could not lose accepted this challenge. The hermit crab was able to deceive the swordfish by spacing out his hermit crab friends all the way to Rotuma. The swordfish was tricked into believing he had lost the race, they raced a second time and again the hermit crab seemed to have reached Rotuma first, angered by his losses the swordfish demanded one last race. The angry swordfish put all of his might into the race and swam faster than he had swum before, he swam so fast that by the time he reached Rotuma he was unable to slow down and crashed right into the island of Hafluia creating the split down its center.

== See also ==
- Desert island
- List of islands
