= Gagaj Maraf Solomone =

Fijian politician

Gagaj Maraf Solomone is a Fijian former political leader and district chief from the district of Noaʻtau, on the island of Rotuma. He served in the Senate from 2001 to 2006 as the nominee of the Council of Rotuma. He was succeeded in this capacity by Dr John Fatiaki in June 2006.
