= Solnohu =

Island in Rotuma Group, Fiji

Solnohu Island
Native name: Solnahu
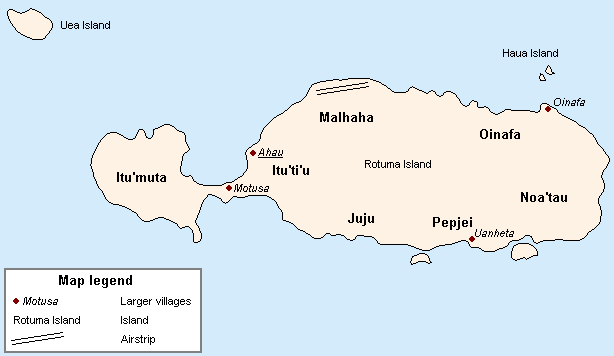
- Schematic map of Rotuma Group (Solnohu is located at its southernmost point)

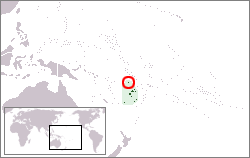
- Location of Solnohu in Polynesia

- Location within Fiji

Geography
- Location: South Pacific Ocean
- Coordinates: 12°31′34″S 177°5′28″E
- Archipelago: Rotuma Group (16 islands inc. Rotuma)
- Area: 9.6 ha (24 acres)
- Highest elevation: 37 m (121 ft)

Administration
- Fiji
- Division: Eastern
- Province: Rotuma
- Tikina: Juju

Demographics
- Population: 0
- Ethnic groups: Rotuman

Additional information
- Time zone: FJT (UTC+12)
  - Summer (DST): FJST (UTC+13)

Solnohu or Sol Nohu, also known as Solnoho, Solnahu and Solnahou, is a small crescent-shaped uninhabited island in the Rotuma Group of Fiji. The island is of special importance in Rotuman and Tongan funerary customs.

== Geography ==
Solnohu is the fourth largest island in the Rotuma Group of sixteen volcanic islands located 646 kilometres (401 mi) north of Fiji. It has an area of 9.6 hectares and lies approximately 70 meters away from the southern district of Juju on the main island of Rotuma, but it is still within the fringing reef. The island is also one of two outliers to the south of Rotuma, the other being Solkope.

== Climate ==
The climate in the area is temperate. The average annual temperature is 20 °C. The warmest month is March, when the average temperature is 26 °C, and the coldest is December, with 0 °C. The average annual rainfall is 3,420 millimeters. The wettest month is February, with an average of 504 mm of precipitation, and the driest is September, with 195 mm of precipitation.

== Flora and fauna ==
Some of the flora common to the island are the Epipremnum pinnatum, a species of flowering plant in the Araceae family and the Merremia peltata, a species of flowering vine in the Convolvulaceae family.

Solnohu is also part of the Rotuma Important Bird Area (IBA) which consists of the main island of Rotuma and associated small satellite islets.

== Mythology ==
One of the island's known legends is that of "The turtle of Sol Onau" (or Sol Onah, both being alternative spellings of Sol Nohu). The legend tells of two girls who slipped from a flat rock platform at the top of the island and fell to the sea. The girls did not die but were instead changed into two immortal sea turtles, one red and one white. They are said to live in the coral under the rock, and can be called up at any time by singing an incantation.

== See also ==
- Desert island
- List of islands
