= Graham Dewes =

Fijian rugby union player (born 1982)

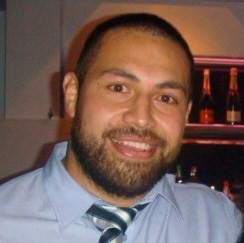
- Dewes in 2010
- Born: Graham Charles Dewes; 24 January 1982 (age 44) Suva, Fiji
- Height: 1.83 m (6 ft 0 in)
- Weight: 118 kg (260 lb)

Rugby union career
- Position: Prop
Amateur team(s)
Years	Team	Apps	(Points)
2001-2007	Marist Brothers Old Boys RFC	49	(0)
Provincial / State sides
Years	Team	Apps	(Points)
2007, 2014	Thames Valley	14	(0)
2009–2010	Counties Manukau	20	(0)
International career
Years	Team	Apps	(Points)
2007–2012	Fiji	29	(10)
Coaching career
- Years: Team
- 2022–: Fiji (Forwards Coach)
- 2019–2023: Northland (Forwards Coach)
- 2024–: Chiefs (Forwards Coach)

Graham Charles Dewes (born 24 January 1982 in Suva) is a former Fijian rugby union player. Known for his contributions to the Fijian national team. Dewes played as a prop and gained prominence during his international career, particularly during the 2007 Rugby World Cup. His memorable moment came when he scored the winning try against Wales, helping Fiji reach the quarter-finals of the tournament for the first time since 1987. Dewes' performance in the World Cup and his overall impact on Fijian rugby have made him a notable figure in the sport.

== Early Life ==
Graham Dewes was educated at St Peter's College, Auckland and was part of the 2000 St Peter's College 1st XV playing as a front-rower.

== Playing career ==
Dewes got his first cap for Fiji on 26 May 2007 in a 30–15 win over Japan. He was a member of the Fiji squad that entered the 2007 Rugby World Cup finals, playing in four matches and scoring the winning try in the 38–34 win over Wales putting Fiji through to their first quarter final in 20 years. Fiji lost that quarter final to eventual winners South Africa despite drawing 20-all for a period in the 2nd half. He had 7 caps by the end of the competition. His mother is Rotuman from Noa'tau, Rotuma. Before his selection into the 2007 squad he had only played third division rugby in the NPC in New Zealand. He played in Auckland's age grades through to U-23s, and Thames Valley in the NPC. He played for Counties Manukau Steelers in New Zealand.

In November 2022, Dewes was named as Fiji's new forwards coach.
