= Paramount chief =

Highest-level political leader of a chief-based system

A paramount chief is the English-language designation for a king or queen or the highest-level political leader in a regional or local polity or country administered politically with a chief-based system. This term is used occasionally in anthropological and archaeological theory to refer to the rulers of multiple chiefdoms or the rulers of exceptionally powerful chiefdoms that have subordinated others.

During the Victorian era, paramount chief was a formal title created by British colonial administrators in the British Empire and applied in Britain's colonies in Asia and Africa. They used it as a substitute for the word "king" to ensure that only the British monarch held that title; in colonized countries without a tradition of Chiefdom, such as the Federated Malay States and the Princely States of the British Raj, the word "ruler" was used instead of "king" for similar reasons. Since the title "chief" was already used in terms of district and town administrators, the addition of "paramount" was made so as to distinguish between the ruling monarch and the local aristocracy.

== Africa ==
=== Eastern African paramount chieftainships and titles ===
- Kenya: Title since 1904 of the former laibon of all the Maasai in Kenya (not in Tanzania)
- Kenya: Title held by supreme ruler Lago Ogom, after the advent of British colonial rule in Northern Kenya.
- Sudan: In South Sudan, the title of the chief responsible for a payam (district) elected by the chiefs of each buma (village). The Paramount Chief works with the government-appointed Payam Director, both of whom report to a county Commissioner.

=== West African paramount chieftains and their countries ===
- Cameroon: Charles Atangana
- Ghana:King Ghartey IV, House of Ghartey
- Nigeria: Ladapo Ademola
- Sierra Leone: Bai Bureh

=== Southern African paramount chieftainships and titles ===
- Kgôsi
  - of each of the eight major tribes of the Tswana, all in Botswana (former Bechuanaland)
- In present Lesotho since it emerged as a polity in 1822, a British protectorate as Basutoland since 12 March 1868 (11 August 1871 – 18 March 1884 Annexed to Cape Colony as Basutoland territory, then as a separate colony, as one of the High Commission Territories). The title changed to king on 4 October 1966, which was the date of the country's independence from the British Empire.
- In Namibia
  - over the Awa-Khoi or "Red Nation" (more prominent than six other 'nations') of the Nama (Khoi) people, a Chiefdom established before 1700.
  - title Okahandja Herero among that people, also Chief Ministers of Hereoroland (two incumbents 20 July 1970 – 5 December 1980), the 'homeland' of the Ovaherero
- In Swaziland the term paramount chief was imposed by the British government over Swazi royal objections in 1903, was never recognized by the Swazi royalty, and was changed to "king" in English upon independence in 1968. The SiSwati name for the office is Ngwenyama, a ceremonial term for "lion".
- In South Africa
  - Khosikulu of the vhaVenda; after the people's split, (only?) of the haMphaphuli
  - title Inkosi Enkhulu of the Xhosa people's following polities: amaGcaleka, amaMbalu, amaRharhabe, amaNdlambe, imiDushane, imiQhayi, amaGasela, amaGwali, amaHleke, AmaKwai, imiDange, amaNtinde, amaGqunukhwebe
  - title Inkosi Enkhulu of the amaBhaca (until 1830 called abakwaZelemu)
  - title Inkosi Enkhulu of the amaKhonjwayo (currently ruled by Dumisani Gwadiso)
  - title Inkosi Enkhulu of the amaMpondo, currently ruled by Ndamase NDAMASE (West) and Jongilanga Sigcau (East) .
  - title Inkosi Enkhulu of the amaMpondomise
  - title Inkosi Enkhulu of the abaThembu, currently ruled by Buyelekhaya Zwelinbanzi Dalindyebo.
  - title Inkosi Enkhulu of the Nhlangwini, currently ruled by Melizwe Dlamini.
  - title Inkosi Enkhulu of the Mbokane Chieftaincy, was ruled by Paramount Chief Manzini Mbokane

== In America ==
- Cahokia,
- Cofitachequi, paramount chief is the Mico
- Coosa, paramount chief is the Mico
- Etowah, paramount chief is the Mico
- Moundville, paramount chief is the Mico
- Ocute, paramount chief is the Mico
- Piscataway Confederacy, paramount chief is the Tayac
- Powhatan Confederacy, paramount chief is the Mamantowick

== In Asia ==
The Great Mongol Khan: Genghis Khan

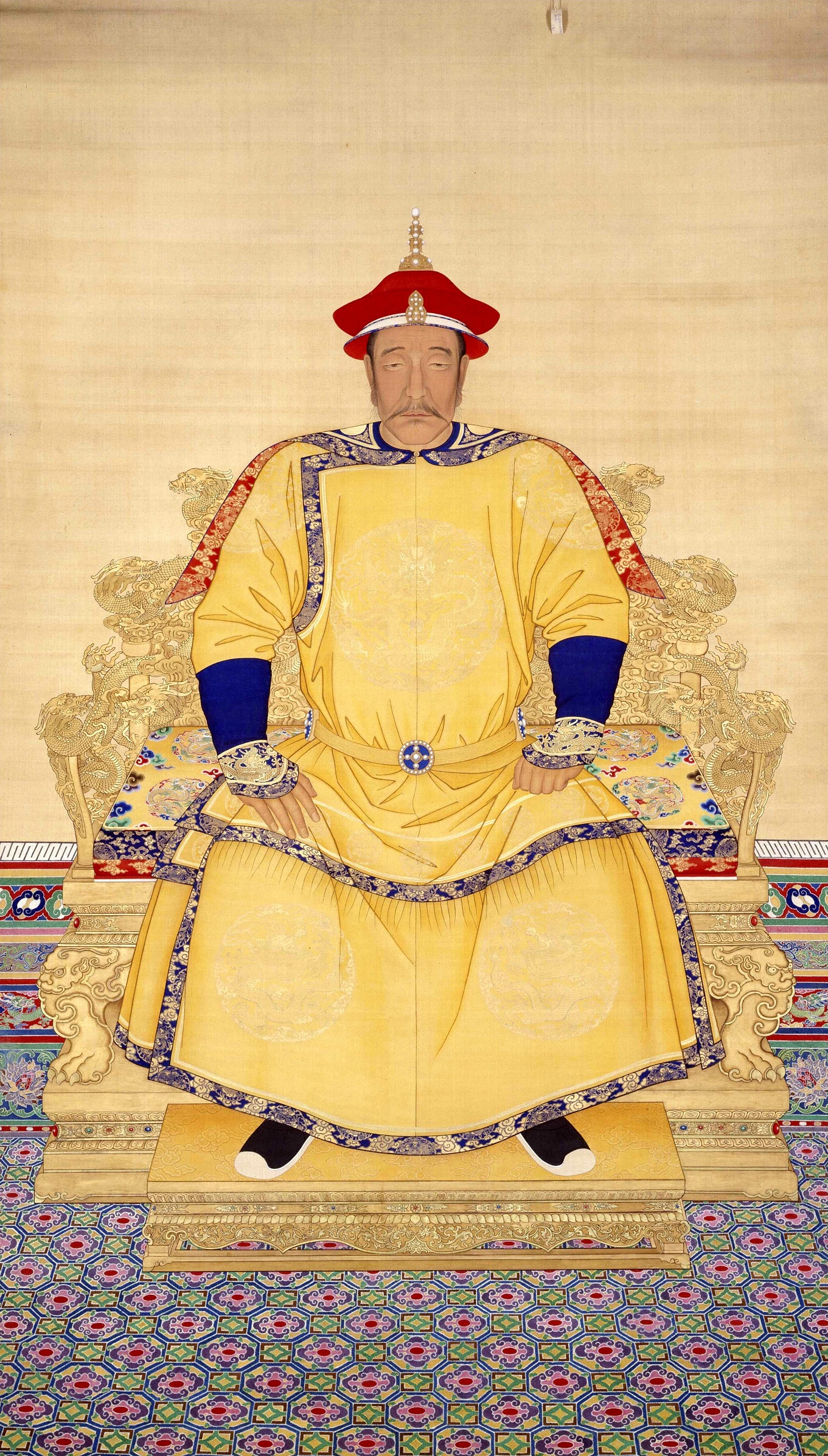
Manchu Tribal Chief Nurhaci

=== East Asia paramount chieftainships and titles ===
- Khan

Khan, alternately spelled lowercase as khan and sometimes spelled as Han, Xan, Ke-Han, Turkic: khān, Mongolian: qāān, Chinese: 可汗 or 汗, kehan or han) is an originally Central Asian title for a sovereign or military ruler, first used by medieval Turko-Mongol nomadic tribes living to the north of China. 'Khan' is first seen as a title in the Xianbei confederation for their chief between 283 and 289 and was used as a state title by the Rouran confederation. It was subsequently adopted by the Göktürks before Turkic peoples and the Mongols brought it to the rest of Asia. In the middle of the sixth century it was known as "Kagan – King of the Turks" to the Persians.

It now has many equivalent meanings such as commander, leader, or ruler. The most famous khan was the Great Khan of Mongols: Genghis Khan. Another famous Manchu khan was Nurhachi.

=== Sabah, Malaysian Borneo ===
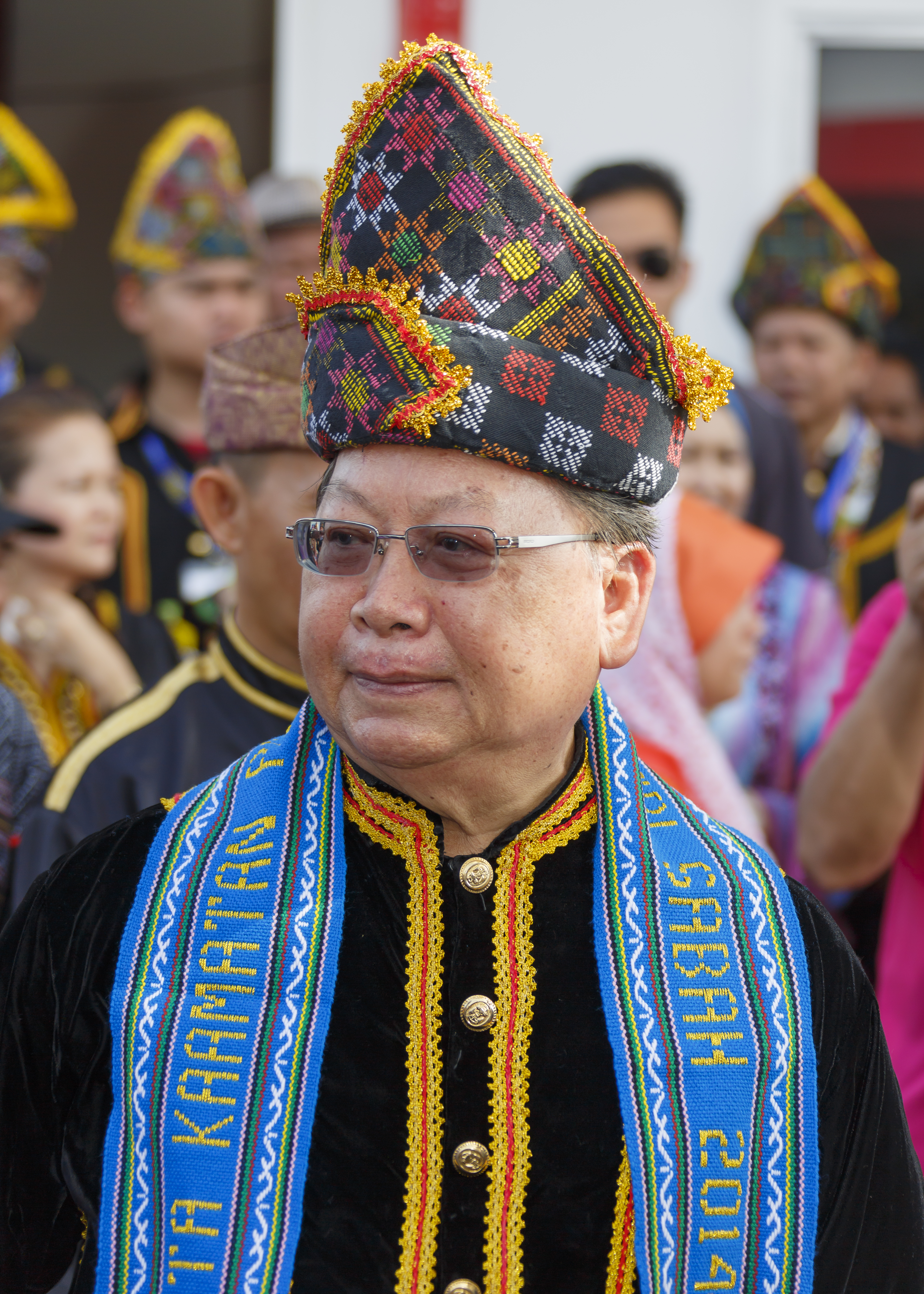
The current Huguan Siou

Huguan Siou is the paramount leader for the Kadazandusun Murut indigenous community in Sabah. The current and the second Huguan Siou is Joseph Pairin Kitingan, a native of Tambunan and its 7th Chief Minister, who succeeded Papar native, Fuad Stephens, who is the 1st and 5th Chief Minister and 3rd state governor. The office is near sacred and can be left vacant if no one is deemed worthy to hold the title.

== In Oceania ==
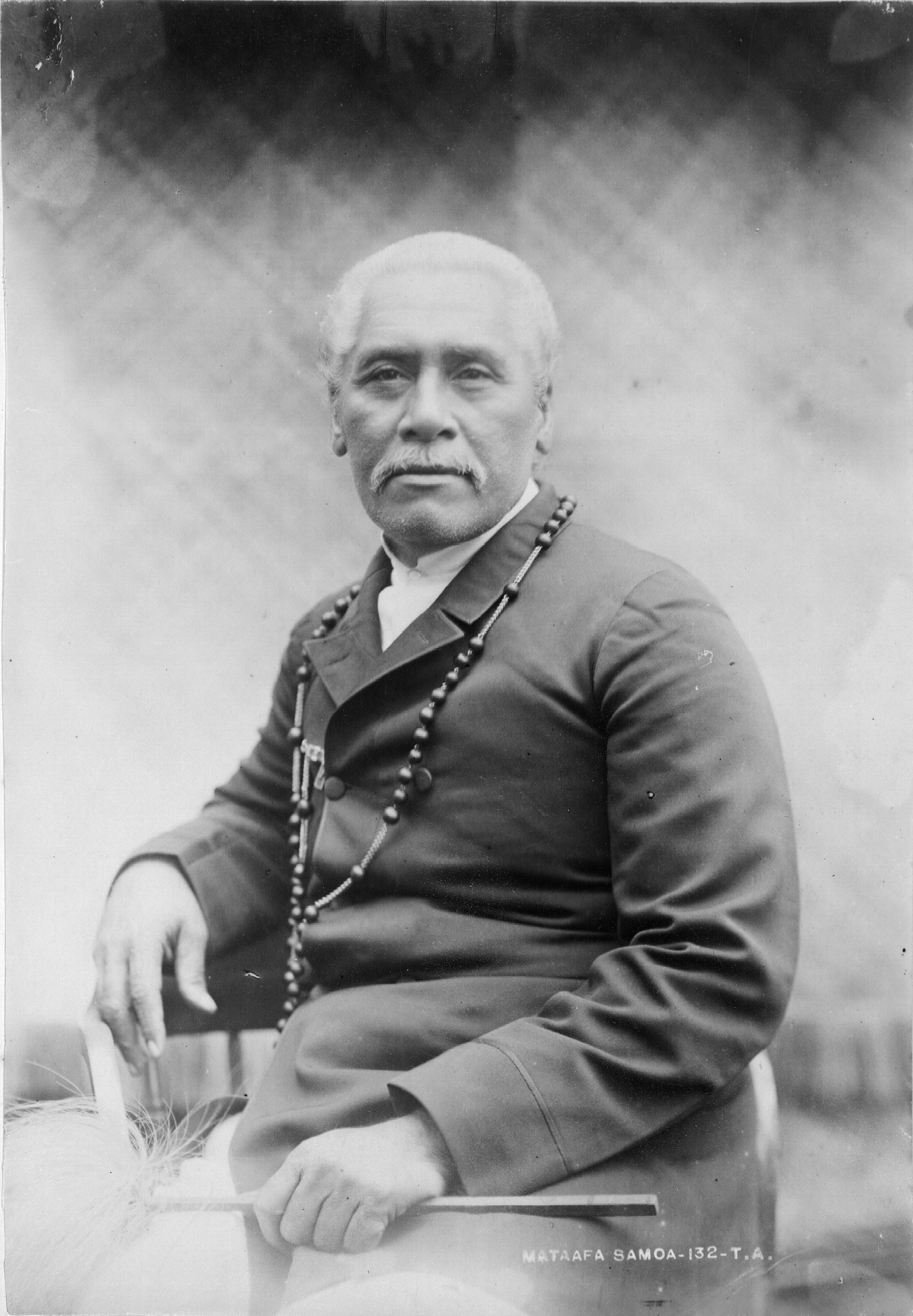
Samoan paramount chief Mata'afa Iosefo (1832–1912)

=== New Zealand ===
- Ariki Nui of Ngati Tuwharetoa, a Māori tribe in the central North Island – a hereditary chieftainship which still has great influence. In the 1850s the Māori King Movement resulted in the election of a Waikato chief as Māori King.

==== Cook Islands ====
- Cook Islands, the paramount chief of the Cook Islands was an ariki of the Makea Nui dynasty, a chiefdom of the Te Au O Tonga tribe in Rarotonga, the Kingdom of Rarotonga was established in 1858 and ended in 1888.

=== Fiji ===
- during the October–December 1987 secession agitation on one island, known as the Republic of Rotuma, led by Henry Gibson (remained in New Zealand), his style was Gagaj Sau Lagfatmaro, rendered as Paramount chief or King of the Molmahao Clan. NB: This title was not recognised by the Rotuma Island Council as the titles Gagaja and Sau have never been used together. The closest thing to a paramount chief is the position of Fakpure, currently belonging to the district chief (gagaj 'es itu'u) of Noa'tau.
- the British Sovereign was recognized as "Paramount Chief", even after the country became a republic on 7 October 1987; however, this was not an office of state.

=== Polynesia ===
- Rapa Nui (Easter Island) paramount chief or king, the ariki henua or ariki mau*.
- Samoa, paramount titles in the fa'amatai chiefly system include; Malietoa, Mata'afa, Tupua Tamasese and Tuimaleali'ifano.
- American Samoa, paramount chief titles in the fa'amatai chiefly system include; Tui Manu'a, Le'iato.

== See also ==
- Chef supérieur
- Great King
- Hegemony
- High king
- Monarchy
- Monarchy of Fiji – the Great Council of Chiefs until de-established in March 2012, recognised Elizabeth II as Tui Viti or Paramount Chief
- Paramount ruler
- Sachem
- Kalaniopuu
