= Cyclone Tino =

Category 3 South Pacific cyclone of 2020

Severe Tropical Cyclone Tino
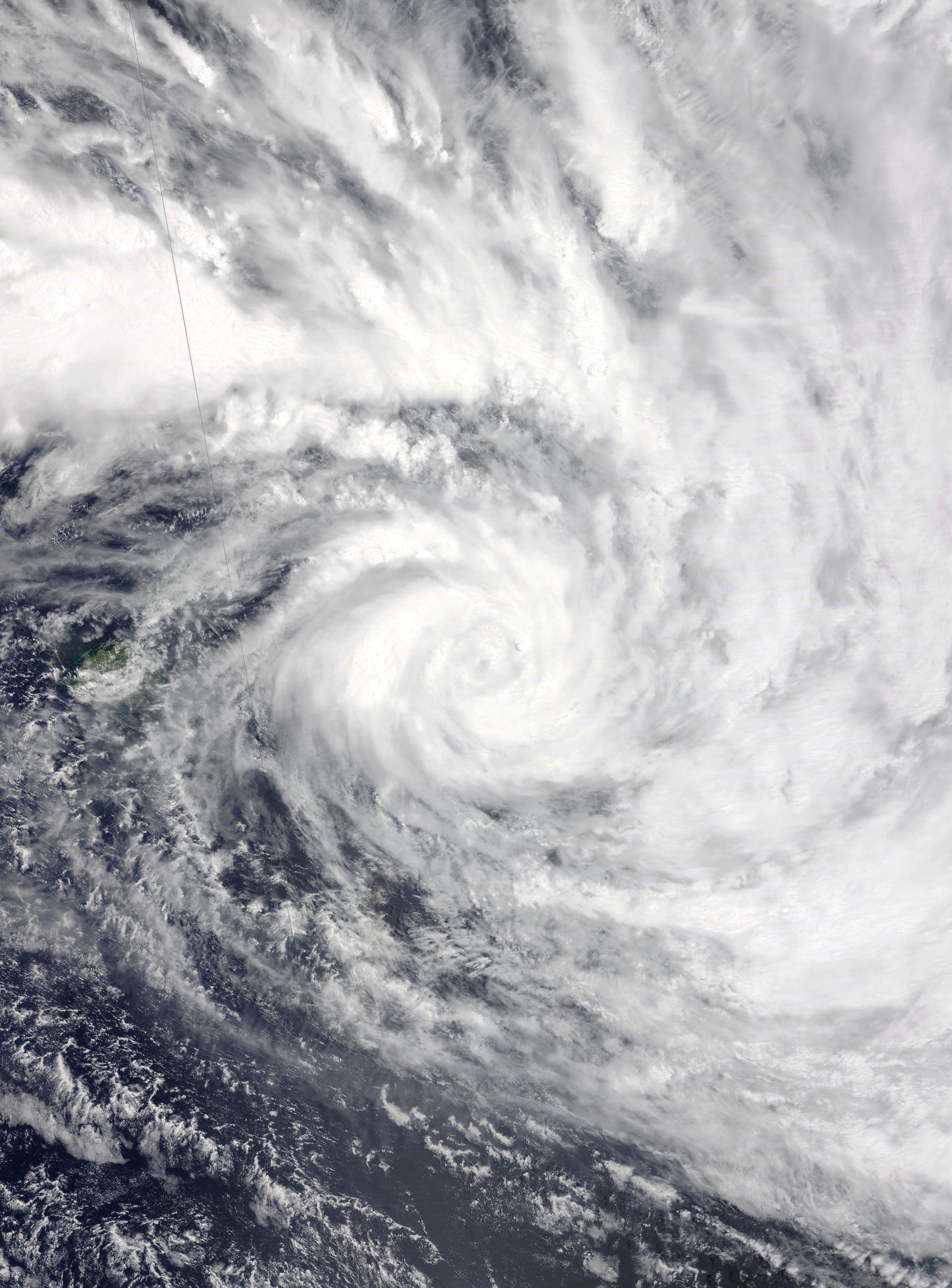
- Tino near peak intensity over Tonga on January 18

Meteorological history
- Formed: January 11, 2020
- Extratropical: January 19, 2020
- Dissipated: January 20, 2020

Category 3 severe tropical cyclone
- 10-minute sustained (FMS)
- Highest winds: 120 km/h (75 mph)
- Lowest pressure: 970 hPa (mbar); 28.64 inHg

Category 2-equivalent tropical cyclone
- 1-minute sustained (SSHWS/JTWC)
- Highest winds: 155 km/h (100 mph)
- Lowest pressure: 955 hPa (mbar); 28.20 inHg

Overall effects
- Missing: 2
- Damage: $5.83 million (2019 USD)
- Areas affected: Solomon Islands, Vanuatu, Fiji, Wallis and Futuna, Samoan Islands, Tuvalu, Tonga
- Part of the 2019–20 South Pacific cyclone season

Severe Tropical Cyclone Tino was a tropical cyclone which itself and an associated convergence zone caused significant damage across ten island nations in the South Pacific Ocean during January 2020. First noted as a tropical disturbance during January 11, to the southwest of Honiara in the Solomon Islands, the system gradually developed over the next few days as it moved eastwards in between the Solomon Islands and Vanuatu prior to being named Tino as it approached Fiji during January 16. Continuing to track south-eastward, Tino continued strengthening as it passed near Fiji, bringing copious amounts of rainfall to the area. Whilst losing latitude, the system continued to strengthen and peaked as a category 3 tropical cyclone on January 17, with signs of an eye forming. Shortly after peak intensity, Tino was impacted by high wind shear and decreasing sea surface temperatures, triggering a weakening trend. Tino moved out of the tropics shortly thereafter and became an extratropical cyclone during January 19.

In its formative stages, Tino produced heavy rainfall over the Solomon Islands and Vanuatu. Wallis and Futuna sustained similar effects, particularly in Wallis where damaged homes and downed trees were reported. Fiji and the Fijian dependency of Rotuma were extensively impacted by the cyclone. Rotuma's wharf in Oinafa was severely damaged, curtailing marine travel. More than 3,000 people sought shelter in Fiji ahead of the storm. The Northern Division was most greatly affected, incurring a US$2.81 million damage toll. Flooding rainfall caused creeks to overflow and thousands were left without power. Two people were missing after being swept by a swollen creek in Serua Province. Roads and crops were damaged in Tonga following Tino's passage on January 18 near peak strength, with the worst effects afflicting the island groups of Vavaʻu and Ha'apai. A convergence zone connected to Tino brought stormy conditions well-spatially and temporally beyond the cyclone's circulation. Waves as high as 8 m (26 ft) struck Tuvalu's low-lying atolls and surrounding waters, causing catastrophic flooding and uprooting numerous crops. The convergence zone also produced damaging swells in Niue and gusty winds in Samoa.

== Meteorological history ==
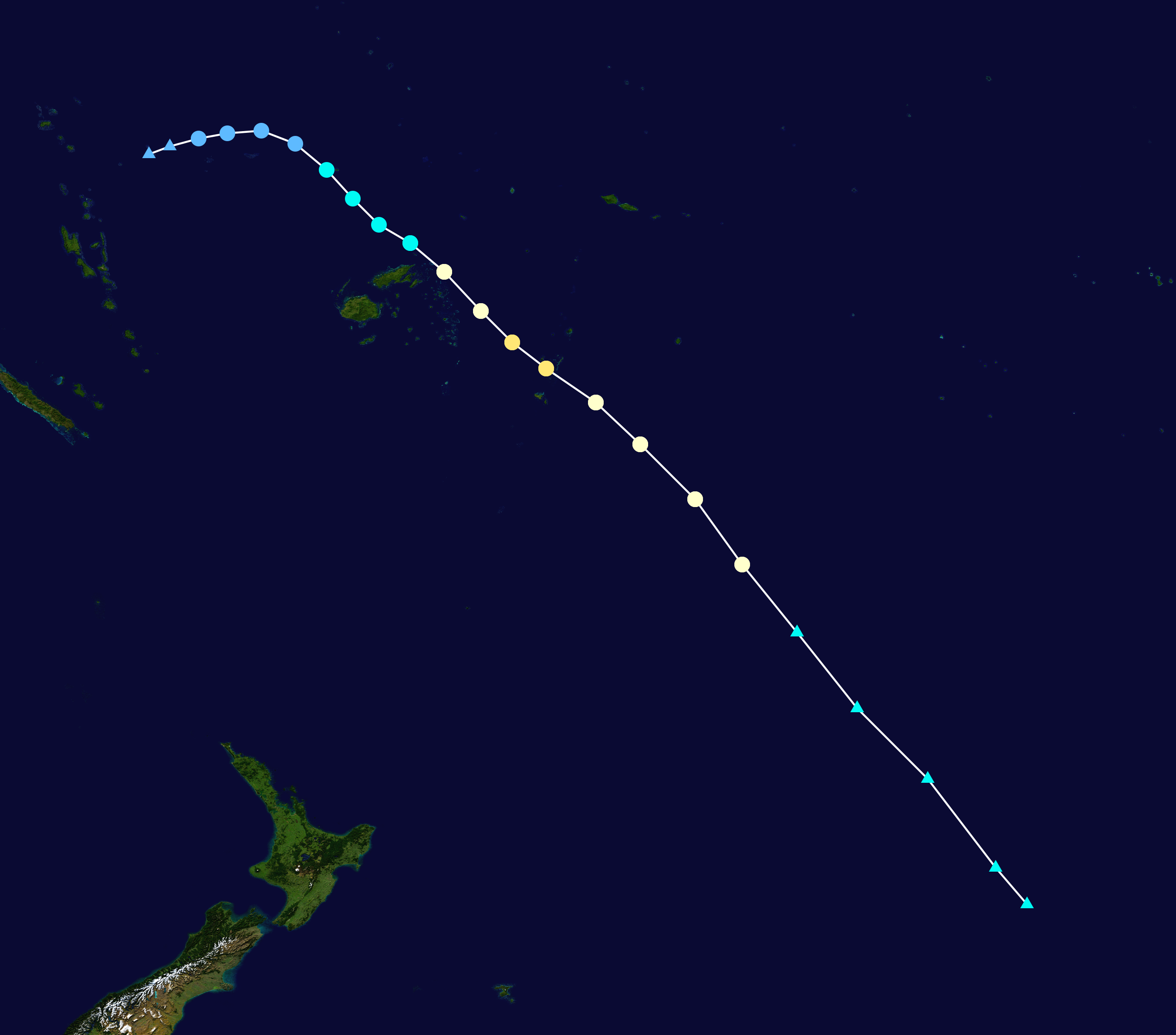
Map plotting the storm's track and intensity, according to the Saffir–Simpson scale Map key Saffir–Simpson scale Tropical depression (≤38 mph, ≤62 km/h) Tropical storm (39–73 mph, 63–118 km/h) Category 1 (74–95 mph, 119–153 km/h) Category 2 (96–110 mph, 154–177 km/h) Category 3 (111–129 mph, 178–208 km/h) Category 4 (130–156 mph, 209–251 km/h) Category 5 (≥157 mph, ≥252 km/h) Unknown Storm type Tropical cyclone Subtropical cyclone Extratropical cyclone, remnant low, tropical disturbance, or monsoon depression

During January 11, the Fiji Meteorological Service (FMS) reported that Tropical Disturbance 04F had developed, about 410 km (255 mi) to the southwest of Honiara in the Solomon Islands. At this time the system was poorly organised with deep atmospheric convection displaced, to the south of the system's broad low level circulation center. The disturbance was also located to the north of a subtropical ridge of high pressure, within a favourable environment for further development, with a low to moderate amount of vertical wind shear and warm sea surface temperatures of 29–31 °C (84–88 °F). Over the next couple of days, the system slowly consolidated and gradually developed further, as it was steered eastwards by the ridge through Temotu Province of the Solomon Islands. The system was subsequently classified as a tropical depression during January 15, while it was located about 570 km (355 mi) to the northeast of Port Vila in Vanuatu. After the system had been classified as a tropical depression, the system continued to develop, with deep convection wrapping on to the systems low-level circulation center. As a result of this and decreasing vertical wind shear, the United States Joint Typhoon Warning Center issued a tropical cyclone formation alert on the system. During January 16, the system started moving south-eastwards towards Fiji and passed within 40 km (25 mi) of the Fijian dependency of Rotuma.

As the system passed near Rotuma, the FMS reported that the depression had developed into a Category 1 tropical cyclone, on the Australian tropical cyclone intensity scale and named it Tino. Later that day the JTWC initiated advisories on the newly named tropical cyclone and designated it as Tropical Cyclone 08P, after its outflow improved with a point source positioning itself over the systems center. During January 17, Tino passed to the east of Udu Point on the Fijian island of Vanua Levu, before it developed an eye as it moved south-eastwards to the east of Fiji's Lau Islands. During January 18, the FMS reported that Tino had become a Category 3 severe tropical cyclone and had peaked with 10-minute sustained wind speeds of 120 km/h (75 mph). At around the same time, the JTWC reported that the system had peaked with 1-minute sustained wind speeds of 155 km/h (100 mph), which made Tino equivalent to a Category 2 hurricane on the Saffir-Simpson hurricane wind scale. Later that day, as the system passed near or over several of Tonga's Ha'apai islands, Tino started to gradually weaken with dry air wrapping into the systems low level circulation center from the south. The system also started to interact with a baroclinic zone and transition into an extratropical cyclone. Tino moved out of the tropics later that day, which prompted the FMS to pass the primary warning responsibility for Tino to New Zealand's MetService. The JTWC then issued their final advisory on the system during January 19, before it was last noted during the next day, as MetService declared that Tino had become an extratropical low.

== Effects ==
Severe Tropical Cyclone Tino directly impacted the Solomon Islands, Vanuatu, Wallis and Futuna, Fiji, Tonga and Niue, while a convergence zone associated with the system impacted Samoa, American Samoa, Tuvalu and the Cook Islands. Tino was the second system to impact Fiji, Tonga, Niue and the Cook Islands in three weeks, after Cyclone Sarai. The name Tino was later retired from the list of South Pacific tropical cyclone names and replaced with Tasi.

=== Tuvalu ===
Despite passing over 500 km (310 mi) to the south of the island nation, Tino and its associated convergence zone impacted the whole of Tuvalu between January 16 - 19. As the system started to impact the low-lying islands, the FMS issued a gale warning for the archipelago and warned that heavy rain, squally thunderstorms, rough to high seas, heavy swells and gale-force winds of 75 km/h (45 mph) were expected on the islands.

Over 200 people had been evacuated on the island preceding the storm. As the storm made its passage, waves as high as 8 m (26 ft) combined with a king tide swept through the atoll's low-lying land, causing catastrophic flooding. The floodwaters churned debris and closed roads across the atoll, effectively locking people inside of their houses. Portions of the atoll's coastline and islets were eroded by meters. Windy conditions were also experienced, with roofs being blown off of houses and trees being uprooted. Due to the atoll's low-lying geography, many crops such as banana trees were uprooted and swept away by the storm. Damage is currently being assessed by the island's government. Additionally, during the storm, Tuvalu's Nukulaelae atoll received significant damage from the storm's outer bands when it was in its earlier stages, delivering a high storm surge which swept through the entire atoll, causing flooding. Torrential rainfall generated by the storm on the atoll also added to the flooding. Tino's winds knocked down trees and destroyed several homes, but the atoll's remaining homes remained with power and water. The government of Tuvalu declared a state of emergency for the country on 24 January, estimating that approximately half of the nation was "severely affected" by Tino. The World Bank granted US$6.2 million to Tuvalu to aid recovery.

=== Rotuma ===
During January 14, the FMS issued a tropical cyclone alert for Rotuma, as Tino's precursor tropical disturbance moved eastwards towards the Fijian dependency. They warned that strong to gale-force winds of between 45–65 km/h (30–40 mph) were expected in the island group, with heavy rain, squally thunderstorms and sea flooding of coastal areas during high tides. During the next day as Tino moved closer to the territory, the FMS issued a gale warning was issued for the dependency.

At the height of the storm, the wharf in Oinafa was damaged by Tino's storm surge, necessitating a barge to transport passengers between ships and the island. Parts of the jetty and associated structures were fully damaged. Rotumans via social media called for the wharf's relocation to the other side of the island. The proposal was considered by the Fiji Roads Authority (FRA), who later stated that the agency did not have any plans to relocate the wharf. The FRA later organized a team to repair a damaged bridge on the wharf.

=== Fiji ===
Enhanced infrared satellite animation of Tino intensifying during its trek near Fiji on January 17

Tino impacted Fiji between January 15–18, where it left two people missing and caused extensive damage within the island nation. During January 14, the FMS issued a heavy rain alert for Vanua Levu, Viti Levu and the Yasawa and Mamanuca group of islands, as well as a tropical cyclone alert for Rotuma. During that day, the rain alert was expanded to include the Lomaviti, Taveuni and the Northern Lau Islands, before a tropical cyclone alert was issued for the rest of Fiji. During January 15, as the system moved eastwards a gale warning was issued for Rotuma, while strong wind warnings, heavy rain alerts and warnings were issued for the main islands of Fiji. Over the next few days, the FMS gradually replaced the tropical cyclone alert, with gale and storm warnings for various islands in the archipelago, including Lakeba, Cicia and Tuvuca. The FMS also issued flash flood warnings for the whole of Fiji's low-lying areas, small streams and flood prone areas.

Fijians were advised by the Water Authority of Fiji to boil and store drinking water in anticipation of the approaching tropical cyclone. Cruises in the area began to be cancelled on January 14. Evacuation centres were opened on January 16 in Fiji's Northern Division, as well as the division's Emergency Operations Centre. At their greatest extent, 65 shelters were active in the division, housing approximately 2,612 evacuees; overall, 78 evacuation centres housed 3,115 displaced people across Fiji during Tino's passage. In preparation of the storm, villagers in the Udu Point region of Vanua Levu were urged to move inland due to rough forecast seas. Tourists evacuated from coastal resorts to Suva as residents sought refuge in shelters. Local police and the Fiji Red Cross Society aided in evacuations. Police officers were also dispatched to patrol urban and rural centres in the Western Division and keep people out of flood-prone areas. Fiji Airways cancelled all regional flights. The Fiji National University campus in Labasa and other businesses in the town closed on January 17, as did all schools in the Northern and Eastern divisions. Most shops in Savusavu closed; businesses and bus service in Labasa and Savusavu resumed operations by January 18. South Sea Cruises suspended operations to the Yasawa Islands under directive from the Maritime Safety Authority of Fiji.

As Tino passed close to Vanua Levu, the second cyclone to pass near the nation within three weeks following Sarai, Fijian government officials called for urgent action on the 'climate crisis' in the South Pacific region, with Fijian Ambassador to the United Nations Satyendra Prasad tweeting "Fiji is counting mode to its 2nd cyclone in [2019-20] today. It and other ocean states look to the UN in its superyear for nature to finally shift the needle on warming oceans." Tino brought showers and gusty winds throughout Fiji. Udu Point experienced the highest winds on Fiji from Tino, recording a peak sustained wind of 77 km/h (48 mph) and a gust of 117 km/h (73 mph) on January 17. A wind gust of 93 km/h (58 mph) was reported in Labasa. Debris picked up by the cyclone's winds damaged power lines and other electrical infrastructure in the Northern Division, leaving thousands of people without power. Several roads were washed out at low-water crossings in the division. Unsafe road conditions forced the suspension of bus services in Taveuni. The power supply in Nayalayala, Taveuni, was shut down during the storm. Surrounding areas were inundated amid the heavy rains. Some health facilities in northern parts of Fiji sustained minor damage from Tino. Between January 16–17, 110 mm (4.3 in) of rain fell in Labasa, marking the highest rainfall total received by the FMS during that timeframe. The highest 24-hour total overall was documented in Sabata at 171 mm (6.7 in). A father and daughter went missing after attempting to cross a flooded creek due to heavy rainfall generated by the system in Serua Province. The Fiji Navy and police forces undertook a search for the missing persons. In Vunaniua, Serua, floodwaters destroyed the main water pipe after an adjoining bridge was inundated. The Fiji National Disaster Management Office indicated that Tino severely affected food security in the Northern Division. Macuata Province and Cakaudrove Province suffered most extensively as many low-lying farms were damaged. Cassava plantations were also damaged. According to the Commissioner of the Northern Division, Tino caused FJ$6.15 million (US$2.81 million) in damage in the Northern Division. The sugar sector suffered extensively, incurring a FJ$3.1 million (US$1.4 million) damage toll. Another FJ$2.9 million (US$1.3 million) in damage was inflicted on infrastructure.

The Western Division saw comparatively minor impacts, experiencing occasionally squally conditions and 45 km/h (28 mph) winds. Following the storm, the NDMO dispatched a team alongside other government officials to deliver relief supplies to the southern Lau Islands. The New Zealand High Commission in Fiji and the New Zealand Ministry of Foreign Affairs and Trade provided FJ$254,000 (US$118,000) in assistance and took part in the NDMO's damage assessment and dissemination of relief supplies. Another US$105,000 was provisioned by the New Zealand Agency for International Development. The Fiji Red Cross also delivered relief item packs to the island group.

=== Tonga ===
On January 16, the Tonga Meteorological Service activated its Fua'amotu Tropical Cyclone Warning Centre and issued a tropical cyclone alert for the whole of Tonga for Tino. The warnings were spatially extensive due to the large convergence zone associated with the cyclone, in addition to the cyclone itself. Public services were shut down the next day following approval by the Cabinet of Tonga. International flights were cancelled or delayed between January 17–18, affecting Air New Zealand flights connecting with Auckland and Air Fiji flights connecting with Nadi. As the storm neared, coastal residents were moved to evacuation centres.

Tino passed through the Tonga archipelago on January 18 as a Category 3 Severe Tropical Cyclone, threatening islands still recovering from Cyclone Gita in 2018. Although Tino was forecast to make a direct hit on Tongatapu, the country's main island, the storm's eye passed just north of the island, with no more than just light showers affecting the island as much of the intense wind and rain were located in the northern section of the storm. Still, the rough surf produced by the passing storm resulted in the second largest swell along the northwestern coast of Tongatapu in 25 years. The Vavaʻu and Ha'apai island groups of Tonga bore the brunt of the storm's impacts, experiencing gusts estimated at 180 km/h (110 mph). The storm surge in Ha'apai damaged roads, including the causeway connecting Lifuka and Foa. The causeway's incapacitation also cut power in the area; overall, 3,000 people lost power in the Ha’apai island group. Member of Parliament Veivosa Taka stated that all crops in the area were damaged. However, damage to housing in Ha'apai was generally minimal. In the storm's aftermath, Papua New Guinea Prime Minister James Marape promised US$860,000 in relief aid for nearby countries affected by Tino, including Tonga. The Tonga Red Cross delivered household relief kits to the Ha'apai island group.

=== Other island nations ===
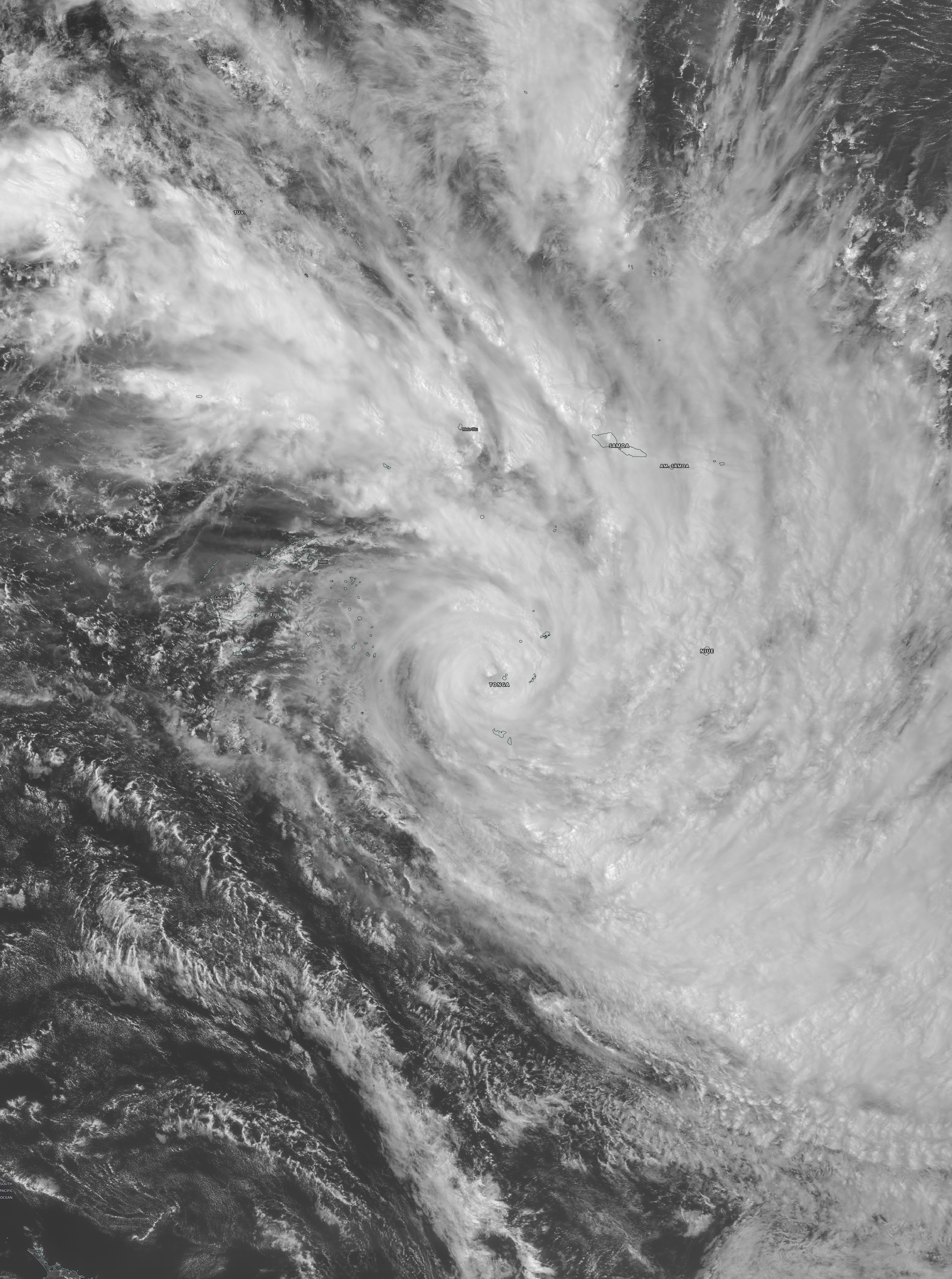
Tino's large rainbands and an associated convergence zone with the system produced inclement weather far from the center of the storm during its path through the southern Pacific, affecting several countries.

During January 12, as Tino's precursor tropical disturbance developed near the Solomon Islands, the Solomon Islands Meteorological Service issued strong wind warnings for eastern provinces and a heavy rain warning for all provinces. The Vanuatu Meteorology and Geohazards Department also issued heavy rain warnings for the provinces of Torba, Sanma, Penama and Tafea. Over the next few days, the system produced heavy rain, in various parts of the two island nations as it gradually developed further.

Tino prompted the issuance of a pre-cyclone alert and later a level 1 cyclone alert for the French overseas department of Wallis and Futuna; this would remain in effect between January 17–20. Flights between the two principal islands were cancelled by Aircalin. The archipelago suffered from torrential rainfall and storm surge as the storm passed nearby, with Futuna being affected not too long before Wallis; Wallis was the most heavily affected. Residents on Wallis reported downed trees, flooded roads, and damaged homes as winds affected the islands on January 17–18. Tino's winds also blew down high voltage lines, causing some power outages.

Although the cyclone was not forecast to strike Samoa directly, a convergence zone connected with Tino was expected to impact the archipelago with heavy rainfall, exacerbating an ongoing period of rains and prompting the issuance of a Heavy Rain Warning by the Samoa Meteorological Service on January 18. Shipping and commercial flights were disrupted, leaving hundreds of marine and air passengers stranded. The convergence zone and Tino's outer rainbands brought squally conditions to the Samoan Islands between January 18–19 as the cyclone passed to the south. Winds between 47–50 km/h (29–31 mph) swept over the Samoan archipelago. A peak wind of 74 km/h (46 mph) was measured at the National Weather Service Weather Forecast Office in Pago Pago, American Samoa on January 17. Trees and billboards were toppled by the inclement conditions, disrupting power lines and blocking roads. Power outages affected several communities throughout Samoa, including much of Upolu Island. Along the coast, ocean swells of 2.5–3 m (8.2–9.8 ft) were measured. In the Manu'a island group of American Samoa, rough surf forced a sheltered ferry in Ofu into a dock, damaging both the ship and the dock.

During January 17, the FMS issued a gale warning for Niue as Tino and its convergence zone, were expected to directly impact the island later that day, with heavy rain, high seas, heavy swells and gale-force winds. The system subsequently passed within 400 km (250 mi) of the island nation, where winds of up to 100 km/h (60 mph) and damaging swells were recorded. Waves also crashed on to cliff tops between 20–30 metres (70–100 ft) high, while coastal areas on the eastern side of the island suffered damage to sea tracks and temporary huts. A fresh hydronics farm situated on the island also sustained damage to its facility which housed vegetables, which it warned would drastically cut vegetable production. Strong winds tore off the top layer of Niue's wharf and damaged tracks along the western coast. Initial repair costs amounted to US$32,000.

The system posed no direct threat to the Cook Islands as it moved to the south of Niue, however, it was noted that Tino and its associated convergence zone would have an impact on the island nation. In particular, it was noted that the system would produce a storm surge, high seas, squally thunderstorms, heavy rain and strong winds of between 35–55 km/h (20–35 mph) on the islands of Rarotonga, Aitutaki, Mangaia and Palmerston. As a result, authorities urged residents to take precautionary measures, stay away from the beach and to be cautious of high tides, while they set up the national auditorium as an emergency evacuation centre. Ahead of the system impacting Rarotonga, residents were seen boarding up their properties and clearing their yards of any loose debris, while boat owners pulled their boats out of the water. The Cook Islands were ultimately spared Tino's effects.

== See also ==
- Other cyclones of the same name
- Tropical cyclones in 2020
- Cyclone Sina (1990)
- Cyclone Pam (2015)
- Cyclone Winston (2016)
