= Fara (Rotuman festivity) =

Traditional Rotuman cultural and social event

Fara (literally, "to ask" in Rotuman) is a traditional Rotuman cultural and social event, occurring in the summertime festival of "av’ manea" ("party time" in Rotuman) where groups of singers and dancers traverse from house to house in a prescribed area to perform and entertain their hosts, "asking", as the name suggests, for their hospitality and participation.

== Manea’ hune’ele, the forerunner to fara ==
It is believed that fara traces its roots back to the "manea’ hune’ele" (beach parties) of old, where young people would picnic at the beach from late afternoon through night-time, singing, dancing and making-merry. For young people it was primarily undertaken as a carefree environment in which they could spend time with prospective partners without the prying eyes of a normal close-knit Rotuman community. However, the politically powerful churches, particularly the Methodist Church, fearing the rise in immoral behaviour resulting from such licentious escapades, and family's fears of loss of the socially important virginity (girls were expected to be married with their virginity intact, attracting a higher bride-price in traditional betrothals) sparked calls to end the practice of manea’ hune’ele. According to research, in the search to replace the tradition, the practice of fara was created, providing a more wholesome way for the young to court.

== Modern-day fara ==
Modern fara involves groups of performers of varying size, often travelling in village or sometimes even district-sized groups. Once at a particular house or hall, they begin dancing and singing, accompanied by guitars, drums and ukulele, and invite the hosts to join in. In return the recipients of this entertainment give the performers food and drink, (usually fruit and cordial) and enact the "nau te", an unceremonious tradition of sprinkling performers (in all Rotuman social environments) with perfume or talcum powder. This historically involved home-made turmeric, but the easier western alternatives now hold precedence.

Fara season is considered the highlight of the year for Rotuman people the world over. It is common for groups of Rotuman individuals who have spread across the globe through diaspora, to return to the island at av’ mane’a and participate in the festivities. It is said that the island's population often doubles at fara time, as compared to the mid-year numbers, as a result of the popularity of the fara.
