= Paul Manueli =

Fijian politician (1934–2019)

- Born: 30 January 1934; Noa’tau, Rotuma
- Died: February 2019 (aged 85)

Colonel Paul Manueli (30 January 1934 - February 2019) was a former Commander of the Royal Fiji Military Forces, a former Fiji Cabinet minister, Senator and successful businessman.

== Biography ==
=== Military career ===
Manueli was of Rotuman and Samoan descent, he was a soldier in the Royal Fiji Military Forces, and a graduate of the Royal Military Academy Sandhurst in England. He had a distinguished career with the Fijian military, and while still a lieutenant, was appointed to the post of district officer on Rotuma for an interim period in 1960. He went on to become a Colonel and the first indigenous Commander of the Fiji Military Forces, which he led from 22 February 1974 until February 22, 1979.

=== Post-Military Career ===
Following his retirement, he enjoyed considerable success as a business leader and served on the boards of numerous corporations, including General Manager of BP in the South Pacific. After the 1987 Fijian coups d'état, Manueli held the portfolios of Minister for Home Affairs, Finance Minister and Minister for Justice in the Fijian Parliamentary Cabinet. Originally a member of the post-coup interim government, Manueli subsequently sought election and won the sole seat for the Rotuman Communal Constituency and was made a Cabinet Minister in Sitiveni Rabuka's governments. His most recent position was as Rotuma's representative on the Great Council of Chiefs, which was abolished in 2012. He also was a member of the executive board of Warwick International Hotels.

Preceded by Brigadier D.J. Aitken	Fiji Military Forces Commander; 1974–1979	Succeeded by Colonel Ian Thorpe
Preceded by Tomasi Vakatora	Minister of Finance; 1992–1994	Succeeded by Berenado Vunibobo
