= Rotuma Day =

Annual celebration in Rotuma, Fiji

- Official name: Rotuma Day
- Observed by: Rotumans
- Celebrations: welcoming ceremony and feast called 'mamasa'
- Date: May 13
- Next time: May 13, 2027
- Frequency: annual

Rotuma Day is an annual celebration on the island of Rotuma, a Fijian dependency. It falls on May 13, the anniversary of the island's cession to the United Kingdom in 1881.

As there are more people of Rotuman descent outside Rotuma than on the island, celebrations are held in other centres besides Rotuma, with big events in Suva and Lautoka.

== Celebrations ==
The 2005 events marked the 124th anniversary of the annexation of the island to the United Kingdom.

Speaking at the Suva celebration, Fiji's High Commissioner to Australia, Major Jioje Konrote, himself a Rotuman Islander, commended Rotumans living outside Rotuma for maintaining their links to their homelands. There are some two thousand people on Rotuma, with a further ten thousand Rotumans in metropolitan Fiji.

Joji Kotobalavu, Chief Executive of the Prime Minister's office, told Rotumans that their island would always be a special part of Fiji, recognized alongside the fourteen provinces. He commended them for their disproportionate achievements and contributions towards the development of Fiji as a country, while Labour Minister Kenneth Zinck paid tribute to the many Rotumans to have distinguished themselves in the fields of education, medicine, business, and society.
