= Republic of Rotuma =

1987 unrecognised state in northern Fiji

- 1987–1988
- Flag

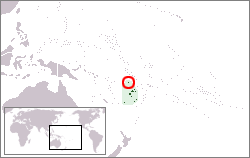
- Common languages: Rotuman
- King
  - 1987–1988: Henry Gibson
- History
  - Established: 1987
  - Disestablished: 1988
Preceded by	Succeeded by
Fiji	Fiji
- Today part of: Fiji

The Republic of Rotuma was an unrealized attempt at creating an independent Rotuma starting in September 1987 after the second Fijian coup. A part-Rotuman man named Henry Gibson announced to the New Zealand newspapers that he had declared the independence of Rotuma from Fiji. Gibson proclaimed himself the King of Rotuma and gained a popular following on the island. Aims to create the republic were aborted in 1988, when advocates were tried with sedition.
