= Solomone =

Solomone is a given name and surname. Notable people with the name include:

- Solomone Bole (born 1974), Fijian sprinter
- Solomone Bauserau (died 2013), Fijian politician
- Solomone Funaki (born 1994), Tongan rugby union player
- Solomone Kata (born 1994), Tongan rugby player
- Solomone Naivalu (fl. 2001–2006), Fijian politician
- Solomone Tukuafu (fl. 2022), New Zealand rugby union player
- Solomone Ula Ata (1883–1950), Prime Minister of Tonga
- Gagaj Maraf Solomone (fl. 2001–2006), Fijian politician
