= UEA =

UEA may stand for:

== Universities ==
- University of East Africa, established in June 1963 and split, in 1970, into:
  - Makerere University in Kampala, Uganda
  - University of Dar es Salaam in Tanzania
  - University of Nairobi in Kenya
- University of East Anglia, established in 1963 in Norwich, England
- Amazonas State University (Portuguese: Universidade do Estado do Amazonas), a university in Manaus, Brazil, established in 2001
- University of East Asia, established in 1981 and renamed the University of Macau in 1991

== Other uses ==
- Universal Esperanto Association, (Esperanto: Universala Esperanto-Asocio), the worldwide organization of the Esperanto movement
- Universal enveloping algebra, a mathematical object
- Utah Education Association, the teachers' union in Utah
- Uea, a Melanesian island in the Rotuma group, a dependency of Fiji
- Uea (title), an I-Kiribati word
- In biology, an abbreviation for "Ulex europaeus agglutinin" (or "Ulex europaeus lectin"), the lectin of the gorse species Ulex europaeus
- Chengdu Airlines (also known as United Eagle Airlines) with ICAO code UEA.
- Uea Point, an area on Tutuila Island in American Samoa
