= Rotuma Group =

Group of islands in Fiji

The Rotuma Group is a group of volcanic islands, with Rotuma Island being the main island, located at 12°35′S 177°10′E, approximately 465 km north of Fiji.

There are some islands located at a distance between 50 m and 2 km from the main island, but still within the fringing reef: Solnohu (south), Solkope (southeast), ʻAfgaha (far southeast), Husia (close southeast), as well as Hạua and Hạuameaʻmeʻa (close together northeast). Additionally, there is a separate chain of islands between three and six km northwest and west of the westernmost point of Rotuma Island. From northeast to southwest, those are Uea, Hạfhai with nearby Hạfhahoi, Hạfhaveiaglolo, Hatana and Hạfliua.

The islands have an aggregate area of 44 km^{2}, of which the main island Rotuma occupies 43 km^{2}. Only the main island is permanently inhabited.

The Rotuma Group comprises a Dependency of Fiji. The population of the dependency at the 1996 census was 2810.

== See also ==
- Desert island
- List of islands
