= Pepjei =

District of Rotuma, Fiji

Coordinates: 12°31′11.15″S 177°7′10.59″E

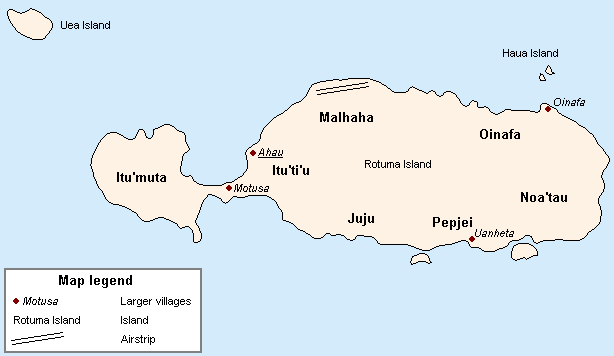
Map showing districts of Rotuma

Pepjei is one of the seven districts on the island of Rotuma, a dependency of Fiji. According to the 2017 census, the district had a population of 119 inhabitants.

It includes the villages of Ujia, Uanheta, and Avave.
