= Sofia Tekela-Smith =

New Zealand-Rotuman artist

Sofia Tekela-Smith (born 1970) is a Scottish/Rotuman artist living in Aotearoa, New Zealand, specialising in jewellery and body adornments. Her work is held in the permanent collections of The Metropolitan Museum New York Auckland Art Gallery Toi o Tāmaki and Museum of New Zealand Te Papa Tongarewa.

== Life ==
Tekela-Smith was born in Auckland, New Zealand, in 1970 to Meriama Sauitu-Tavo island of Rotuma, a protectorate of Fiji and John Smith, from Uddingston Glasgow, Scotland/Longford, Ireland. Tekela-Smith was raised on Rotuma by their maternal grandmother Mue Tekela and grandfather Sumasafu Petero until her grandmother's death in the early 1980s, when she returned to Auckland to live with her parents.

Tekela-Smith's jewellery uses traditional materials such as bone, shell and stone. She first exhibited in 1993 in Tufa'atasi, a fashion show at the International Festival of the Arts in Wellington. In 1996 her work was included in some group shows in Auckland and she also performed with Pacific Sisters at the Seventh South Pacific Festival of the Arts in Apia, Samoa.

Sofia Tekela-Smith is a New Zealnd artist of Rotuman, Futunana, Uvean and Scottish heritage. Her work explores themes of Pasifika cultural identity, heritage reclamation and the experiences of the diaspora

Her work has been exhibited in both solo and group shows including Victoria&Albert Museum London 2026, at Macleay Museum, University of Sydney in 1999; the 3rd New Zealand Jewellery Biennial at Auckland Museum in 2000; and the exhibition Pacific Adornment at Te Papa in 2002. Her jewellery has also been shown in Germany, at Haus der Kulturen der Welt, and in New York. Her work is held in Public Collections

- The Metropolitan Museum, New York,
- New Zealand Maritime Museum Hui Te Ananui a Tangaroa, Auckland, NZ
- Auckland Museum, Tāmaki Paenga Hira Aotearoa, NZ
- Auckland Art Gallery, Toi o Tamaki, Auckland NZ
- Te Papa Tongarewa, Museum of New Zealand, Wellington
- Grassi Museum, Leipzig, Germany
- Queensland Art Gallery GOMA, Brisbane, Australia
- National Gallery of Victoria (NGV), Melbourne Australia
- Dowse Art Museum, Wellington, NZ
- University of Auckland, Auckland NZ
- Interview 2023 -
- Digital workshop teaching
- Interview 2003 -
- The CoconetTv - The Metropolitan Museum 2025
- ABC Pacific News 2025
