= Uea =

High rocky offshore island of Rotuma, Fiji

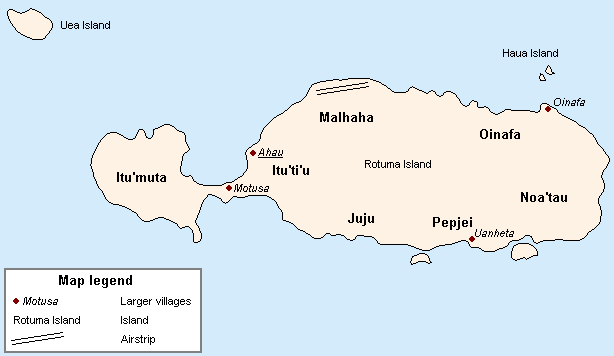

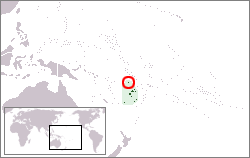

- Location within Fiji

Geography
- Location: South Pacific Ocean
- Coordinates: 12.4658°S 176.9914°E
- Archipelago: Rotuma Group
- Highest elevation: 260 m (850 ft)

Administration
- Fiji
- Division: Eastern
- Province: Rotuma
- Tikina: Ituʻtiʻu

Demographics
- Ethnic groups: Rotuman

Additional information
- Time zone: FJT (UTC+12)
  - Summer (DST): FJST (UTC+13)

Uea is a high rocky offshore island of Rotuma. Uea is one of a number of outliers lying off the west coast of Rotuma. It is the second largest island and is the highest island in the Rotuma Group with an elevation of 260 metres (850 ft).

The endemic bird Rotuma myzomela (Myzomela chermesina) is found only on the main island of Rotuma and Uea.

The geological features and the beach forests of the island contribute to its national significance as outlined in Fiji's Biodiversity Strategy and Action Plan.
