= Solkope =

Island in Rotuma Group, Fiji

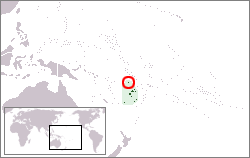
- Rotuma (dark green) in Fiji (light green)

- Location within Fiji

Geography
- Location: South Pacific Ocean
- Coordinates: {12°31′27″S 177°07′02″E
- Archipelago: Rotuma Group
- Area: 0.3 km^{2} (0.12 sq mi)
- Length: 0.765 km (0.4753 mi)
- Width: 0.515 km (0.32 mi)
- Highest elevation: 128 m (420 ft)

Administration
- Fiji
- Division: Eastern
- Province: Rotuma
- Tikina: Noaʻtau

Demographics
- Population: 0

Solkope is a small and densely wooded island off the southern coast of Rotuma in the Fiji Islands, at the edge of the fringing coral reef. It is separated from the main island of Rotuma by a channel that is between 50 and 200 m wide, and lies immediately southeast of the village of Kalvaka in the district of Noaʻtau. It 765 m long east–west, and up to 515 m wide, and rises to a height of 128 m. Its area is 0.3 km^{2}. From the sea, it cannot be recognised as a separate island.

== Secessionist movement ==
In 2000 Solkope was the subject of a land ownership dispute, as a consequence of an attempted secession of Rotuma from Fiji which was jointly orchestrated by the Molmahao Clan of Noaʻtau district, and unrecognized micronation Dominion of Melchizedek. According to documents tendered in court pertaining to the case, the native land owner of Solkope Island, Hiagi Apao and Melchizedek's "Head of House of Elders", Tzemach "Ben" David Netzer Korem, concluded a "99 year sovereign master lease agreement", under which control of Solkope was ceded to the "government" of Melchizedek.

As of June 2008, the DOM website still lists the island as one of its territories, although Korem is banned from entering Fiji, and there is no Melchizedek presence of any sort on the island.

== Mythology ==
Anthropologist Gordon MacGregor recorded a Rotuman myth concerning Solkope when he visited Rotuma in 1932. The legend, as told to MacGregor by islander Tuirotuma, concerns a rock on the sea-facing side of Solkope. This rock is the tupuaʻ Leptafeke (a tupuʻ is the spirit of a prominent person who now resides in a rock, star, or planet). The Rotuman legend tells that this rock once resided on the island of Haua off the coast of Oinafa. During a great fish drive on Oinafa, Leptafeke's share of the catch was given away. The rock became angry and began to shift itself around Rotuma to get away from Haua. Eventually coming to Solkope, the tupuʻa decided to settle on the sea-facing side of the island so as to hide from Oinafa.

== See also ==
- Desert island
- List of islands
