= Malhaha =

District of Rotuma, Fiji

Coordinates: 12°29′4.12″S 177°4′19.71″E

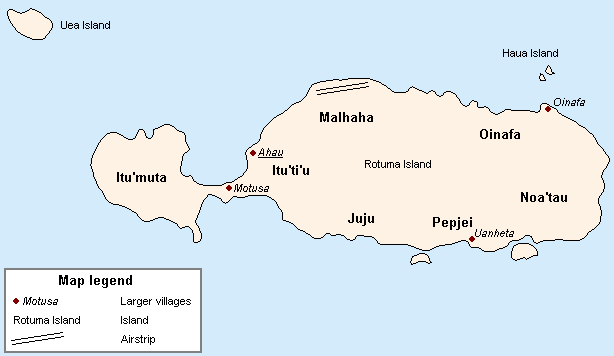
Map showing districts of Rotuma

Malhaha is one of the seven districts on the island of Rotuma, a dependency of Fiji. According to the 2017 census, the district had a population of 233 inhabitants.

It includes the villages of Pepheua, Elseʻe, and Elsio. It is here that Raho, the founder of Rotuma, established his residence.
