= Council of Rotuma =

Type
- Type: Unicameral

Leadership
- Chair: Tarterani Rigamoto
- Seats: 7 elected members 7 traditional chiefs 3 advisory members

Meeting place
- "Tariạgsạu", ʻAhạu, Ituʻtiʻu District

The Council of Rotuma is a municipal body on the island of Rotuma, a Fijian dependency. Owing to the unique character of Rotuma, the powers of this council are greater than those of other municipal bodies in Fiji and in some ways it approximates a legislative body, though it is in every way subordinate to the Parliament of Fiji.

== Members ==
The Council consists of fourteen full members and three advisory members. Each of Rotuma's seven districts elects one representative to the council; the traditional chief of each district is also a Council member ex officio. The advisory members, who have speaking rights but not voting rights, are the district officer, the most senior medical officer, and the most senior agricultural officer, all of whom serve ex officio.

The seven chiefs are chosen according to traditional custom. The election is usually for life, although the Fijian cabinet minister responsible for Rotuma may, at his or her own discretion, dismiss a chief and order the election of a new one.

The seven elected representatives are elected for three year terms by resident Rotuman Islanders aged 21 and over. Candidacy is restricted to persons who are eligible to vote.

The full members of the Council elect a chairman from among themselves. In addition to his vote as a member of the council, the chairman has a casting vote in the event of a tie. The present chairman is Gagaj Taimanav Taukave.

== Responsibilities ==
The council is required to meet at least once every three months. The chairman and nine other members constitute a quorum to do business. Special meetings may be called by the chairman, on his own initiative or that of eight members of the council.

The council has the following powers and responsibilities:

- to implement directives of the Fijian cabinet minister responsible for Rotuma.
- to administer the Rotuman development Fund established by the Rotuma Act
- to make bylaws relation to the environment, waste disposal, and public health.
- to make bylaws for the promotion of the social and economic betterment of the Rotuman community
- to regulate communal work
- to regulate the prevention or removal of the public
- to provide for the care of children and the elderly
- to regulate the conservation of food supplies on Rotuma. Such regulations may provide for imprisonment of up to four months, or a fine of up to one hundred dollars, or both.

In addition, the Council historically has also had two other important responsibilities, which were effectively terminated by the military coup of 2006 and the subsequent promulgation of the 2013 Constitution:

- to nominate 3 members of the Great Council of Chiefs. The Great Council was abolished by the military-backed Interim Government.
- to nominate 1 member of the Fijian Senate. The most recent senator representing the Rotuma Island Council was Dr John Fatiaki, who served from June 2006 till the military coup of 5 December 2006. The Senate itself was abolished by the 2013 Constitution.
