= Ituʻmuta =

District of Rotuma, Fiji

Coordinates: 12°30′12.9″S 177°1′13.08″E

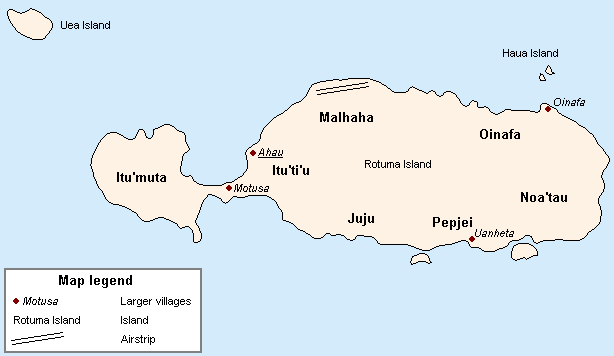
Map showing districts of Rotuma

Ituʻmuta is one of the seven districts on the island of Rotuma, a dependency of Fiji. According to the 2017 census, the district had a population of 95.

It includes the villages of Maftoa and Lopo.
