= Juju (district) =

District of Rotuma, Fiji

Coordinates: 12°31′6.6″S 177°4′3.33″E

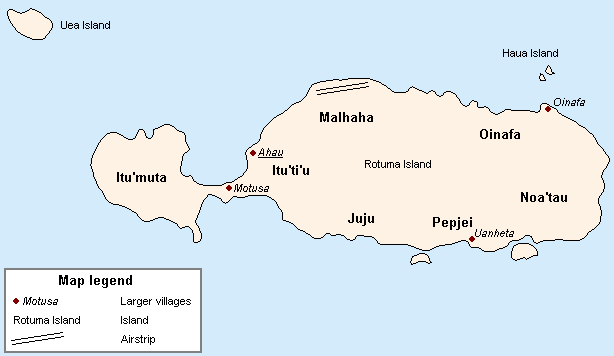
Map showing districts of Rotuma

Juju is one of the seven districts on the island of Rotuma, a dependency of Fiji. According to the 2017 census, the district had a population of 209 inhabitants.

It includes the villages of Juju, Toai, and Haga.
