= Oinafa =

District of Rotuma, Fiji

Coordinates: 12°29′23.54″S 177°6′36.89″E

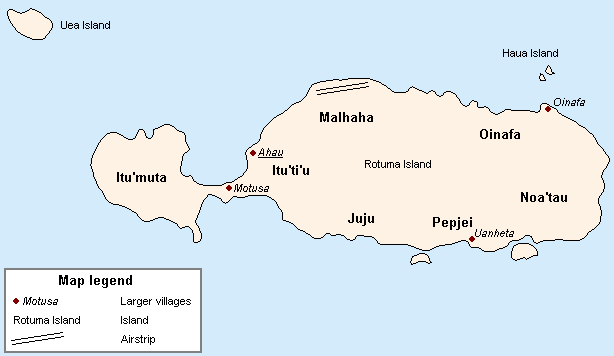
Map showing districts of Rotuma

Oinafa is one of the seven districts on the island of in Rotuma, a dependency of Fiji. According to the 2017 census, the district had a population of 142 inhabitants.

It includes the villages of Oinafa, Lopta, and Paptea.
