= Motusa =

Group of villages in Rotuma, Fiji

Coordinates: 12°31′S 177°02′E

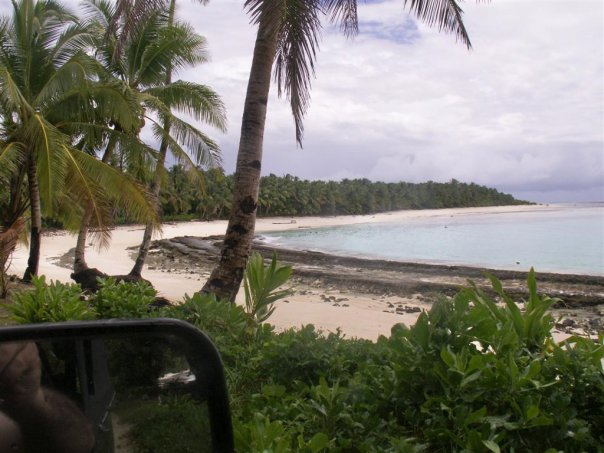
Mofmanu Beach, the popular main beach adjacent to the village of Motusa

Motusa is a group of close villages in the district of Itu'tiu, on the island of Rotuma, one of the islands of Fiji. Rotuma is made up of two volcanic landmasses connected by a sandy isthmus, on which Motusa is located. For this reason it has one of the islands longest white sandy beach. Motusa also sits between the Islands two largest bay; Maka Bay to the North and Hapmafau Bay to the South.

Motusa consists of the following places:

- Ạilala
- Agai Maftoa
- Atapisi
- Elseʻe
- Elsio
- Fagmạn
- Farsạu
- Fonmạn
- Hamatua
- Haroa
- Islepi
- Jumjumi
- Leitunoa
- Lum'ava
- Malniu
- Mofmanu
- Tạnmohini
- Tia
- Tuifiriga
- Salagvaka
- Samoa
- Uanheta
- Upu

Motusa also has a primary school known as Motusa District School, that consist of Year 1 to Year 8. Motusa is about one kilometer southwest of Ahau, the government station, which is also the location of the island's post office, and a small hospital. Ahau is now the administrative center of Rotuma, although for a long time Motusa, being the largest settlement, and one of the best moorings, was the centre of most business transactions and industry.

== Historical events ==
In 1871, a battle occurred here between Catholic and unconverted Motusan and the Wesleyans. Christian missionaries backed by their respective nations (the Catholic French and Protestant Wesleyan British) exacerbated the pre-existing strained relationship between Motusan chiefs.

The British flag was raised in Motusa on May 13, 1881, seven years after Fiji was ceded to the British. It was attended by Fiji's colonial governor William Des Vœux and the high chiefs of the seven districts of Rotuma.
