= Rotuma =

Dependency of Fiji

Rotuma रोतुम (Fiji Hindi)
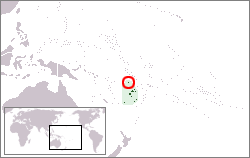
- Location of Rotuma in Fiji

- The island of Rotuma, located to the far north, in relation to mainland Fiji
- Status: Dependency of Fiji
- Administrative center: Ahau; 12°29.9′S 177°2.82′E
- Official languages: Rotuman; English; Fijian; Hindi
- Ethnic groups: Rotuman ∟Fagutan
- Demonyms: Rotuman ∟Fagutan

Government
  - Gagaj Pure (District Officer): Niumaia Masere
  - Gagaj Jeaman (Council Chairman): Tarterani Rigamoto

Establishment
  - Faguta's special status agreed to by Rotuma's chiefs in the Treaty of Hamelin: 11 September 1871
  - Rotuma ceded to the United Kingdom: 13 May 1881
  - Independence from the United Kingdom granted as part of Fiji: 10 October 1970

Area
  - Total: 47 km^{2} (18 sq mi)

Population
  - 2017 census: 1,583
- Currency: Fiji dollar (FJD)
- Time zone: UTC+12
- Calling code: +679
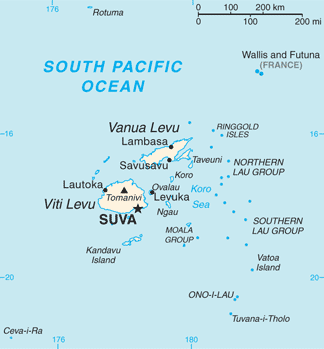

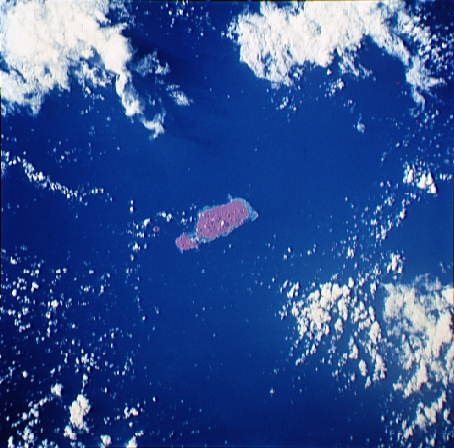
Satellite image of Rotuma

Rotuma (/roʊˈtuːmə/) is a self-governing territory generally designated a dependency of Fiji. Rotuma commonly refers to the Rotuma Island, the only permanently inhabited and by far the largest of all the islands in the Rotuma Group. Officially, the Rotuma Act declares that Rotuma consists of Rotuma Island as well as its neighbouring islands, rocks, and reefs across the entire Rotuma Group. The dependency is situated around 500 km west of the French islands of Wallis and Futuna and a similar distance north of the Fijian mainland. Its capital is Ahau, a hamlet consisting of a number of colonial-era buildings. Rotuma exists as a dependency of Fiji but itself contains its own socioreligious pene-enclave (Note: An analogous situation is that of Danelaw, a part of the island of Britain with a social system which set it apart from other contemporaneous kingdoms on the island.) known traditionally as Faguta where the chiefs (of Juju and Pepjei) and their villages adhere to the practices of worship, festival dates, and French-based writing system of the Marists, based at Sumi.

The island group is home to a large and unique Polynesian indigenous ethnic group which constitutes a recognisable minority within the population of Fiji, known as "Rotumans". Its population at the 2017 census was 1,583, although many more Rotumans live on mainland Fijian islands, totaling 10,000.

== History ==
=== Origins according to oral history ===
Rotuma was first inhabited according to record by people of Tahiti Nui, Marquesas, and Rapa Nui. At that time, it was known as Siria. Little was known about the exact years of migration from these far Eastern Kingdoms of those times. The only information known was that Rotuma was used by these three Kingdoms as the royal burial ground for the Kings and Queens of Tahiti Nui and Rapa Nui.

Rotuma was known as Siria by the indigenous peoples of Tahiti Nui and Rapa Nui as it was named after the star which lies exactly above the location of the island. Thus, the people of those days prayed to a mythical figure known as Tagaroa Siria. In remembrance of this old royal burial ground, a certain species of seaweed was given as a token of blood ties to remember the old and special bonds between Tahiti Nui and Rotuma. This particular species of seaweed is a delicacy amongst the islands, but it only grows on Tahiti and Rotuma. This seaweed species was said to be given by a Princess of Bora Bora. The princess' name was Teura ("redness") of Bora Bora, who married the legendary Prince Te-Fatu of Rotuma.

The first foreigner to arrive in Rotuma is sometimes named in oral tradition as Bulou ni Wasa, who arrived with her seven brothers. The name of the canoe that brought her and her family was known as Rogovoka. Her brothers left her on the island and made their way to Fiji. When she disembarked on Rotuma onto a rock which her priests called Vatu Vonu (Haf kafaghoi ta), the rulers of Rotuma are said to have immediately given her the name Tafatemasian, coincidently the same meaning as Adi Rarama ni Wasa (a spirit encircled with light). Without meeting her, some say Prince Sarefua and Princess Tefuimena decided that she be installed immediately as the ruler of the island as a gesture of welcome and therefore persuaded her to stay and rule the island.

Later settlers of the islands are believed to have come from Samoa, and were led by a man named Raho. In 1896, the scholar Friedrich Ratzel recorded a Samoan legend about Samoans' relationship to Rotuma:

"Thus the Samoans relate that one of their chiefs fished in the vicinity of Rotuma and then planted coco-palms on the main island. In a later migration the chief Tokaniua came that way with a canoe full of men and quarrelled with the Samoan chief Raho about who had the right of possession."

=== Rotuman Revolution ===
While Tongan forces invaded and occupied the island at one point in the 17th century, managing to consolidate their hold over the island and its people, eventually the Rotumans rebelled. According to the Acting-Resident Commissioner of Rotuma W.E. Russell, Rotumans ultimately overthrew their Tongan occupiers in a bloody uprising that took place over a single night.

=== European contact ===
Tupaia's Map is among the most important artifacts to have come from late 18th-century European–Indigenous encounters in the South Pacific region and features, in Epeli Hau‘ofa's terms, a "sea of islands" extending for more than 7,000 km from Rotuma in the west to Rapa Nui in the east and more than 5,000 km from Hawai‘i in the north to New Zealand in the south. The earliest known confirmed European sighting of Rotuma was in 1791, when Captain Edward Edwards and the crew of HMS Pandora landed in search of sailors who had disappeared following the Mutiny on the Bounty. Some scholars have suggested that the first European to sight the island was, instead, Pedro Fernandes de Queirós; his description of an island he sighted is consistent with the characteristics and location of Rotuma. However, this possibility has not been conclusively substantiated.

=== France, Catholicism, and Coquille ===
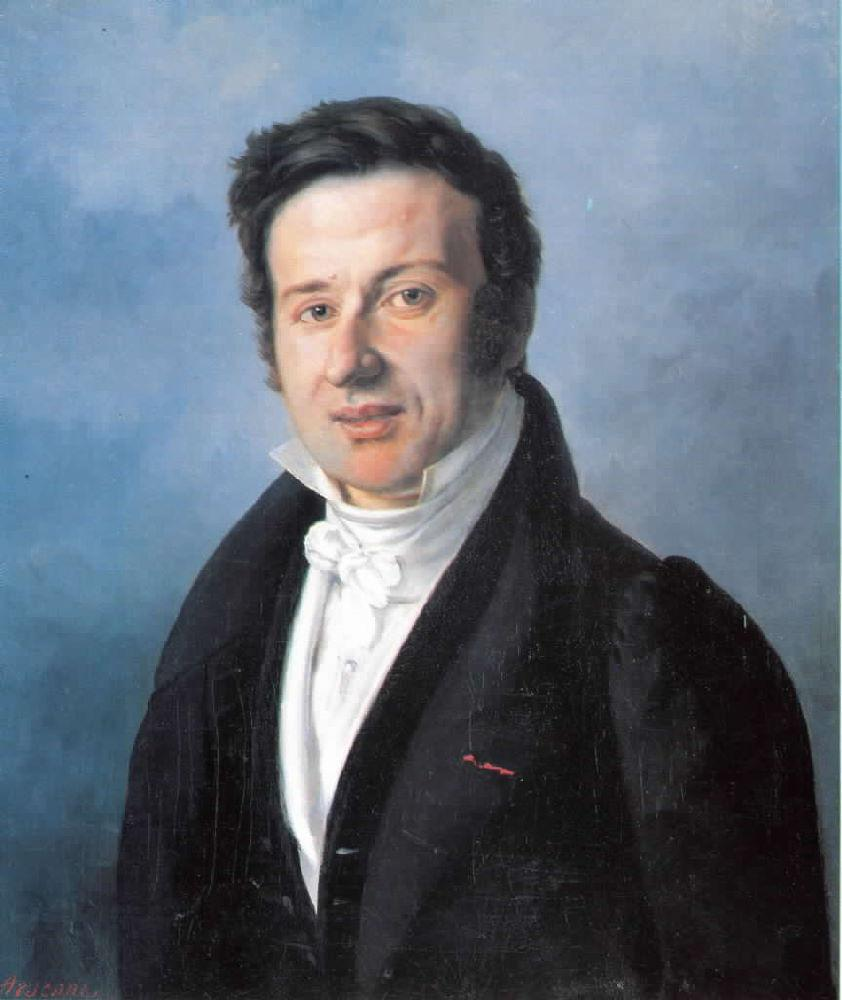
Frenchman René Lesson whose sharing of his beliefs in 1824 was recorded as the first such occasion on the island.

In 1824, French surgeon and naturalist René Lesson arrived in Rotuma onboard the vessel Coquille. Lesson observed that the Rotumans had no awareness of an afterlife; his revelation of such an idea therefore made French Catholicism, the official religion of the state of his employ, the Kingdom of France, the first faith shared with the Rotumans. His catechising would subsequently be formalised and reinforced by French Marists two decades later, most especially in the formerly conjoined chiefdoms of Faguta, Pepjei and Juju, as well as extending into neighbouring districts, especially Ituʻtiʻu.

=== Whaling ===
A favorite of whaling ships in need of reprovisioning, in the mid-nineteenth century Rotuma also became a haven for runaway sailors, some of whom were escaped convicts. Some of these deserters married local women and contributed their genes to an already heterogeneous pool; others met violent ends, reportedly at one another's hands. The first recorded whaleship to visit was the Loper in 1825, and the last known visit was by the Charles W. Morgan in 1894. Rotuma was visited as part of the United States Exploring Expedition in 1840.

=== Tongan invasion and the Wesleyan agenda ===
In the 1850s and 1860s, the Tongan prince Ma'afu claimed possession of Rotuma and sent his subordinates to administer the main island and its neighboring islets. Ma'afu had earlier made a serious effort to spread his Wesleyan beliefs to eastern Fiji and the Tongan invasion of Rotuma allowed him to consolidate its hold over a new group, the Rotumans in the north of the island.

=== Cession to Britain ===
Wesleyan missionaries from Tonga arrived on Rotuma in June 1841, followed by Catholic Marists in 1847. The Roman Catholic missionaries withdrew in 1853 but returned in 1868. Conflicts between the two groups, fuelled by previous political rivalries among the chiefs of Rotuma's seven districts, resulted in hostilities that led the local chiefs in 1879 to ask Britain to annex the island group. On 13 May 1881, Rotuma was officially ceded to the United Kingdom, when the British flag was hoisted by Hugh Romilly. The event is annually celebrated as Rotuma Day.

In 1881, a group of Rotuman chiefs travelled to Levuka, Ovalau, Fiji, to meet Queen Victoria's official representative to complete the process of cession. A memorial to the seven chiefs and their mission is located in the District of Ituʻtiʻu. In response to the cession, Queen Victoria bestowed the name of Albert on the paramount chief at the time - Gagaj Vaniak - in honour of her beloved husband, Prince Albert, who had died twenty years before. In June 2017, Pene Saggers (née Enasio) met with Her Majesty Queen Elizabeth II and together they spoke about the links between their ancestral lines and the cession of Rotuma.

After Rotuma was ceded to the United Kingdom, it was governed as part of the Colony of Fiji. Rotuma remained with Fiji after Fiji's independence in 1970 and the military coups of 1987.

== Geography and geology ==
The Rotuma group of volcanic islands are located 646 kilometres (401 miles) (Suva to Ahau) north of Fiji. Rotuma Island itself is 13 kilometres (8.1 miles) long and 4 kilometres (2.5 miles) wide, with a land area of approximately 47 square kilometres (12,000 acres), making it the 12th-largest of the Fiji islands.

The island is bisected by an isthmus into a larger eastern part and a western peninsula. The isthmus is low and narrow, only 230 metres (750 ft) wide, and is the site of Motusa village (Ituʻtiʻu district). North of the isthmus is Maka Bay, and in the south is Hapmafau Bay. There is a large population of coral reefs in these bays, and there are boat passages through them.

Rotuma is a shield volcano made of alkali-olivine basalt and hawaiite, with many small cones. It reaches 256 metres (840 ft) above sea level at Mount Suelhof, near the center of the island. Satarua Peak, 166 metres (540 ft) high, lies near the eastern end of the island. While they are very secluded from much of Fiji proper, the large reef and untouched beaches are renowned as some of the most beautiful in the Republic of Fiji.

There are several islands that lie between 50 metres (160 ft) and 2 kilometres (1.2 miles) distant from the main island, but are still within the fringing reef. They are:

- Solnohu (south)
- Solkope and Sariʻi (southeast)
- ʻAfgaha and Husia Rua (far southeast)
- Husia (Husiatiʻu) and Husiameaʻmeʻa (close southeast)
- Hạuameaʻmeʻa and Hạua (Hạuatiʻu) (close together northeast).

There is also a separate chain of islands that lie between 3 kilometres (1.9 miles) and 6 kilometres (3.7 miles) to the northwest and west of Rotuma Island. In order, from northeast to southwest, these are:

- Uea
- Hạfhai
- Hạfhahoi
- Hạfhaveiaglolo
- Hatana
- Hạfliua.

The geological features of this island contribute to its national significance, as outlined in Fiji's Biodiversity Strategy and Action Plan.

Pigs are so widespread in Rotuma their stone enclosures are a prominent feature of the island. Scientists conducting a botanical survey of the island in 2000 even remarked on this:

"Pig rearing, often within elaborate stonewalled pens, is also an integral component of the agricultural system and has been recognized by Rotumans as having a considerable impact."

The Acting-Resident Commissioner of Rotuma, W.E. Russell, dubbed this network of stone pig sty fences the "Great Wall of Rotuma".

== Climate ==
Climate data for Rotuma Island (1991–2020 normals)
| Month | Jan | Feb | Mar | Apr | May | Jun | Jul | Aug | Sep | Oct | Nov | Dec | Year |
|---|---|---|---|---|---|---|---|---|---|---|---|---|---|
| Record high °C (°F) | 34 (93) | 33 (91) | 34 (93) | 32 (90) | 32 (90) | 32 (90) | 32 (90) | 32 (90) | 32 (90) | 32 (90) | 33 (91) | 32 (90) | 34 (93) |
| Mean daily maximum °C (°F) | 31.2 (88.2) | 31.1 (88.0) | 31.1 (88.0) | 31.1 (88.0) | 30.7 (87.3) | 30.0 (86.0) | 29.7 (85.5) | 29.7 (85.5) | 29.9 (85.8) | 30.3 (86.5) | 30.8 (87.4) | 31.1 (88.0) | 30.6 (87.1) |
| Daily mean °C (°F) | 28.1 (82.6) | 28.1 (82.6) | 28.1 (82.6) | 28.1 (82.6) | 27.9 (82.2) | 27.5 (81.5) | 27.2 (81.0) | 27.2 (81.0) | 27.3 (81.1) | 27.5 (81.5) | 27.9 (82.2) | 28.1 (82.6) | 27.8 (82.0) |
| Mean daily minimum °C (°F) | 25.0 (77.0) | 25.0 (77.0) | 25.0 (77.0) | 25.1 (77.2) | 25.1 (77.2) | 24.9 (76.8) | 24.6 (76.3) | 24.6 (76.3) | 24.6 (76.3) | 24.7 (76.5) | 24.9 (76.8) | 25 (77) | 24.9 (76.8) |
| Record low °C (°F) | 20 (68) | 21 (70) | 21 (70) | 22 (72) | 20 (68) | 20 (68) | 18 (64) | 20 (68) | 19 (66) | 17 (63) | 20 (68) | 20 (68) | 17 (63) |
| Average precipitation mm (inches) | 359.9 (14.17) | 312.8 (12.31) | 359.5 (14.15) | 264.5 (10.41) | 275.8 (10.86) | 274.2 (10.80) | 249.0 (9.80) | 248.2 (9.77) | 289.1 (11.38) | 355.4 (13.99) | 323.5 (12.74) | 322.7 (12.70) | 3,634.6 (143.09) |
| Average precipitation days (≥ 1.0 mm) | 19.9 | 19.0 | 19.5 | 18.4 | 15.9 | 17.1 | 17.1 | 17.2 | 17.9 | 18.4 | 17.9 | 19.1 | 217.4 |
| Average relative humidity (%) | 83 | 83 | 83 | 84 | 83 | 82 | 82 | 81 | 81 | 82 | 83 | 82 | 82 |
| Mean monthly sunshine hours | 166.2 | 162.6 | 177.8 | 194.2 | 194.5 | 178.9 | 194.1 | 201.4 | 179.5 | 193.2 | 188.7 | 182.4 | 2,213.5 |
Source 1: World Meteorological Organization
Source 2: Deutscher Wetterdienst

== Flora and fauna ==
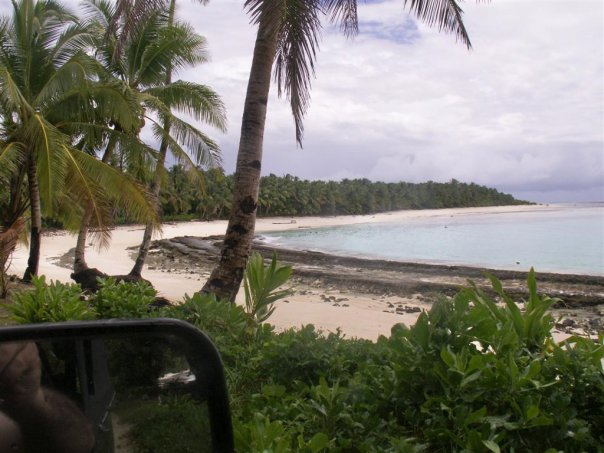
Mofmanu beach in Motusa, Rotuma

A 4,200-hectare (10,000-acre) area covering the main island and its small satellite islets is the Rotuma Important Bird Area. The Important Bird Area covers the entire range of the vulnerable Rotuma myzomela, and the Rotuman subspecies of Polynesian starling and Fiji shrikebill. Rotuma also supports isolated outlying populations of Crimson-crowned fruit dove and Polynesian triller. The offshore islets of Haʻatana, Hofliua and Hatawa have nationally significant seabird colonies.

== Demographics ==
Although the island has been politically part of Fiji since 1881, Rotumans are Polynesians and their culture more closely resembles that of the Polynesian islands to the east, most noticeably Tahiti, Tonga, Samoa, Futuna, and Uvea. Because of their Polynesian appearance and distinctive language, Rotumans now constitute a recognizable minority group within the Republic of Fiji. The great majority of Rotumans (9,984 according to the 2007 Fiji census) now live elsewhere in Fiji, with 1,953 Rotumans remaining on Rotuma.

Population in Rotuma
| Year | Population |
|---|---|
| 1986 | 2588 |
| 1996 | 2619 |
| 2007 | 1893 |
| 2017 | 1594 |

Rotumans are staunchly conservative culturally and maintain their customs in the face of changes brought about by increased contact with the outside world; social trends which have emerged elsewhere have remained entirely unwelcome in Rotuma. As recently as 1985, some 85 percent of Rotumans voted against opening the island up to tourism, concerned about the impact of an influx of secular tourist outsiders. P&O Cruises landed on the island only twice in the 1980s. Rotumans' inherent conservatism has led to a strict form of sociodemographic preservation. Indians and Chinese have no presence in Rotuma, unlike other Fijian islands, where these groups have managed to acquire property and establish themselves; this is because in Rotuma landholdings are held exclusively for the use and benefit of the island's own Rotuman people.

== Notable Rotumans and people of Rotuman descent ==
- Robin Everett Mitchell: president of the Association of National Olympic Committees; the Oceania National Olympic Committee; and "Olympic Solidarity".
- Paul Manueli: former commander of the Royal Fiji Military Forces; Fiji cabinet minister; senator; successful businessman
- Jioji Konrote: president of Fiji (from 2015 to 2021); former high commissioner to Australia
- Greg Fasala (of Rotuman descent on his Father’s side): Australian swimmer and Olympic medalist
- Liebling Marlow (of Rotuman descent on her Mother’s side): first ever Miss Hibiscus/Miss Fiji
- Letila Mitchell: Miss Hibiscus/Miss Fiji 1997 & first runner up at Miss Pacific Islands 1997
- Lusia Delai (of Rotuman descent on her Mother’s side): Miss Hibiscus/Miss Fiji 2006
- Brittany Hazelman (of Rotuman descent on her Mother’s side): Miss World Fiji 2015
- Jaxon Evans: racing driver.
- Lington Ieli: rugby player for the ACT Brumbies
- Matt Leo (of Rotuman descent on his father’s side): Australian-born player for the Philadelphia Eagles in the National Football League (NFL)
- Marieta Rigamoto: former Fiji information minister
- Priscilla Olano Young (of Rotuman descent on her Mother’s side): Miss Samoa 2016
- Caleb Clarke (rugby union) (Maternal Grandfather) New Zealand rugby union player
- Callum Simpson (Paternal Grandmother) Australian Paralympic medalist
- Daniel Fatiaki: Chief Justice of Fiji
- Seán Óg and Setanta Ó hAilpín (brothers of Rotuman descent): Irish sportsmen
- John Sutton: National Rugby League player
- Vilsoni Hereniko: playwright; film director
- Sapeta Taito: actress (The Land Has Eyes)
- Jono Gibbes (of Rotuman descent on his mother's side): New Zealand rugby union player
- Tai Wesley (of Rotuman descent on his father’s side): former basketball player and former Guam Basketball representative
- Rocky Khan (of Rotuman descent on his mother's side): New Zealand Rugby Union player
- Graham Dewes: Fiji Rugby Union player
- Daniel Rae Costello (of Rotuman descent): Fijian-born musician
- Rebecca Tavo (has a Rotuman father): Australian touch-rugby player
- Selina Hornibrook (has a Rotuman mother): former Australian netball player
- Ngaire Fuata (has a Rotuman father): New Zealand television producer and singer
- Pene Erenio: top Fiji soccer player (Savusavu)
- Ravai Fatiaki: Fiji Rugby Union player
- Sofia Tekela-Smith (raised on Rotuma by her grandmother): New Zealand artist
- David Eggleton (of Rotuman descent on his mother's side): Poet Laureate of New Zealand
- Fred Fatiaki: coach
- Lee Roy Atalifo: Fiji Rugby Union player
- Rhyelle Aisea: Miss Hibiscus 2025

== Politics and society ==
=== Political offices ===
Rotuma is divided into seven districts, each with its own chief (Gagaj ʻes Ituʻu), making the dependency over-governed. The district chiefs and elected district representatives make up the Rotuma Island Council. The districts are divided into subgroupings of households (hoʻaga) that function as work groups under the leadership of a subchief (gagaj ʻes hoʻaga). All district headmen and the majority of hoʻaga headmen are titled. In addition, some men hold titles without headship (as tög), although they are expected to exercise leadership roles in support of the district headman. Titles, which are held for life, belong to specified house sites (fuạg ri). All the descendants of previous occupants of a fuạg ri have a right to participate in the selection of successors to titles.

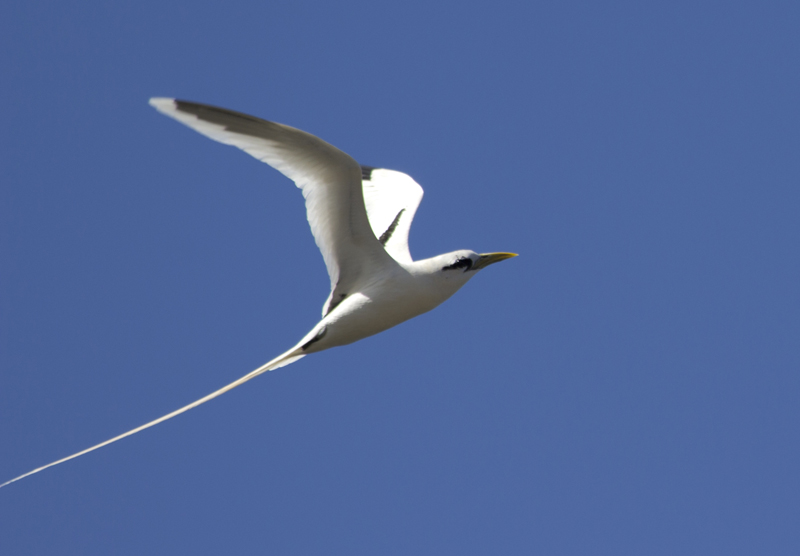
Participants of the formal tautoga dance sometimes wear the lengthy tailfeathers of the white-tailed tropicbird, called the "täväke" in Rotuman

On formal occasions, titled men and dignitaries such as priests, ministers, government representatives, and distinguished visitors occupy a place of honor. They are ceremonially served food from special baskets and kava. In the daily routine of village life, however, they are not especially privileged. As yet no significant class distinctions based on wealth or control of resources have emerged, but investments in elaborate housing and motor vehicles by a few families have led to visible differences in standard of living.

At the time of arrival by Europeans, there were three pan-Rotuman political positions created by the Samoan invaders: the fakpure, the sạu, and the mua. The fakpure acted as convener and presiding officer over the council of district headmen and was responsible for appointing the sạu and ensuring that he was cared for properly. The fakpure was headman of the district that headed the alliance that had won the last war. The sạu's role was to take part in the ritual cycle, oriented toward ensuring prosperity, as an object of veneration. Early European visitors referred to the sạu as "king", but he actually had no secular power. The position of sạu was supposed to rotate between districts, and a breach of this custom was considered to be incitement to war. The role of mua is more obscure, but like the sạu, he was an active participant in the ritual cycle. According to some accounts the mua acted as a kind of high priest.

Following Christianisation in the 1860s, the offices of sạu and mua were terminated. Colonial administration involved the appointment by the governor of Fiji of a Resident Commissioner (after 1935, a District Officer) to Rotuma. He was advised by a council composed of the district chiefs. In 1940 the council was expanded to include an elected representative from each district and the Assistant Medical Practitioner. Following Fiji's independence in 1970, the council assumed responsibility for the internal governance of Rotuma, with the District Officer assigned to an advisory role. Up until the first coup, Rotuma was represented in the Fiji legislature by a single senator.

=== Elections ===
Administratively, Rotuma is fully incorporated into Fiji, but with local government so tailored as to give the island a measure of autonomy greater than that enjoyed by other political subdivisions of Fiji. At the national level, in the past Fijian citizens of Rotuman descent elected one representative to the Fijian House of Representatives, and the Council of Rotuma nominated one representative to the Fijian Senate. Rotuma was also represented in the influential Great Council of Chiefs by three representatives chosen by the Council of Rotuma. For electoral purposes, Rotumans were formerly classified as Fijians, but when the Constitution was revised in 1997–1998, they were granted separate representation at their own request. (The majority of seats in Fiji's House of Representatives are allocated on a communal basis to Fiji's various ethnic groups.) In addition, Rotuma forms part (along with Taveuni and the Lau Islands) of the Lau Taveuni Rotuma Open Constituency, one of 25 constituencies whose representatives are chosen by universal suffrage.

=== Social control ===
The hoʻaga, a kinship community, was the basic residential unit in pre-contact Rotuma. The basis for social control is a strong socialisation emphasis on social responsibility and a sensitivity to shaming. Gossip serves as a mechanism for sanctioning deviation, but the most powerful deterrent to antisocial behavior is an abiding belief in imminent justice, that supernatural forces (the ʻatua or spirits of ancestors) will punish wrongdoing. Rotumans are a rather gentle people; violence is extremely rare and serious crimes nearly nonexistent.

=== Conflict ===
Prior to cession, warfare, though conducted on a modest scale, was endemic in Rotuma. During the colonial era political rivalries were muted, since power was concentrated in the offices of Resident Commissioner and District Officer. Following Fiji's independence, however, interdistrict rivalries were again given expression, now in the form of political contention. Following the second coup, when Fiji left the Commonwealth of Nations, a segment of the Rotuman population, known as the "Mölmahao Clan" of Noaʻtau rejected the council's decision to remain with the newly declared republic. Arguing that Rotuma had been ceded to the United Kingdom and not to Fiji, in 1987 these rebels attempted to form an independent aristocratic maritime republic which they called the Republic of Rotuma but they were promptly charged with sedition and the entity disintegrated almost immediately. It did not have any substantive support and while majority opinion appears to favor remaining with Fiji some rumblings of discontent remain.

== Territorial divisions ==
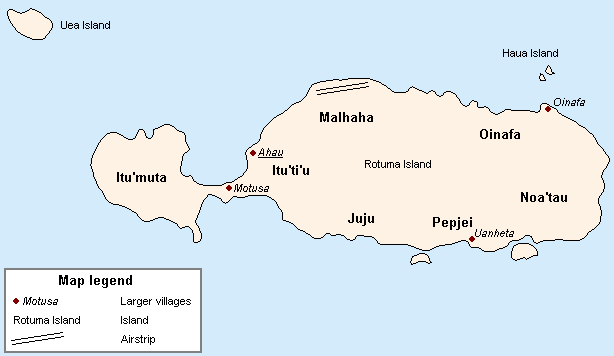
Schematic map of Rotuma indicating districts and main villages

Rotuma's seven districts can be grouped into three agglomerations: the medial and northern districts, the capital district, and the traditional territory of Faguta (whose special character was effectively agreed to by all Rotuma's chiefs in 1871 in the Treaty of Hamelin).

=== 2017 Census ===
| Tikina (District) | Ethnicity | | | | | | Total |
| Tikina (District) | iTaukei | % | Indo-Fijian | % | Other | % | Total |
|---|---|---|---|---|---|---|---|
| Ituʻmuta | 7 | 7.4 | 0 | 0.0 | 88 | 92.6 | 95 |
| Ituʻtiʻu | 45 | 6.8 | 10 | 1.5 | 605 | 91.7 | 660 |
| Juju | 9 | 4.3 | 2 | 1.0 | 198 | 94.7 | 209 |
| Malha'a | 58 | 24.9 | 3 | 1.3 | 172 | 73.8 | 233 |
| Noaʻtau | 1 | 0.8 | 0 | 0.0 | 124 | 99.2 | 125 |
| Oinafa | 12 | 8.5 | 0 | 0.0 | 130 | 91.5 | 142 |
| Pepjei | 7 | 5.9 | 0 | 0.0 | 112 | 94.1 | 119 |
| Rotuma total | 139 | 8.8 | 15 | 0.9 | 1,429 | 90.3 | 1,583 |

=== Medial and northern districts ===
==== Noaʻtau ====
Noaʻtau (extreme southeast) contains the villages Fekeioko, Maragteʻu, Fafʻiasina, Matuʻea, ʻUtʻutu, and Kalvaka.

==== Oinafa ====
Oinafa (east) contains the villages Oinafa, Lopta, and Paptea.

==== Malhaha ====
Malhaha (north) contains the villages Pepheua, ʻElseʻe, and ʻElsio.

==== Ituʻmuta ====
Ituʻmuta (western peninsula) contains the villages Maftoa and Lopo.

=== Capital district ===
==== Ituʻtiʻu ====
Ituʻtiʻu (west, but east of western peninsula) contains the villages Savlei, Lạu, Feavại, Tuạʻkoi, Motusa, Hapmak, Losa, and Fapufa.

ʻAhạu, also located in the District of Ituʻtiʻu, is the capital and where the "tariạgsạu" (traditionally the name of the sạu's palace) meeting house for the Council of Rotuma is based which functions as Rotuma's seat of government.

=== Faguta ===
The southern part of Rotuma is known traditionally as Faguta, a territory encompassing Juju and Pepjei, whose chiefs lead socioreligious communities which follow the ecclesiastical, cultural, and linguistic teachings of the Marists of France.

Faguta
| Ituʻu | Location | Villages |
|---|---|---|
| Juju | south | Juju; Tuại; Haga |
| Pepjei | southeast | ʻUjia; Uạnheta; Avave |

Ituʻu is a Rotuman geographic term typically considered equivalent to a chiefdom or district.

==== Timeline of Faguta ====
The main island in the Rotuma Group was formerly partitioned into five parts. One of these parts, Faguta, was located to the south of Rotuma Island, across the strait from Solnohu island. Faguta's chief, alongside the chief of Noatau, were generally considered the most influential of all those across the island and effectively governed the island's south and north, respectively. The significance of these two chiefs was reflected in the fact that the position of the head of the island's governing council alternated between the chief of Faguta and the chief of Noatau, depending on which of the two had been victorious in the last conflict between them. However, following victory and invasion by opposing forces (internecine conflict was endemic for centuries on Rotuma), Faguta was forcibly divided into two by the other districts' chiefs in an effort to weaken its influence, thereby forming Juju and Pepjei (although the territory is still commonly referred to by the two districts' inhabitants and descendants as "Faguta").

==== Mythology centred around Faguta ====
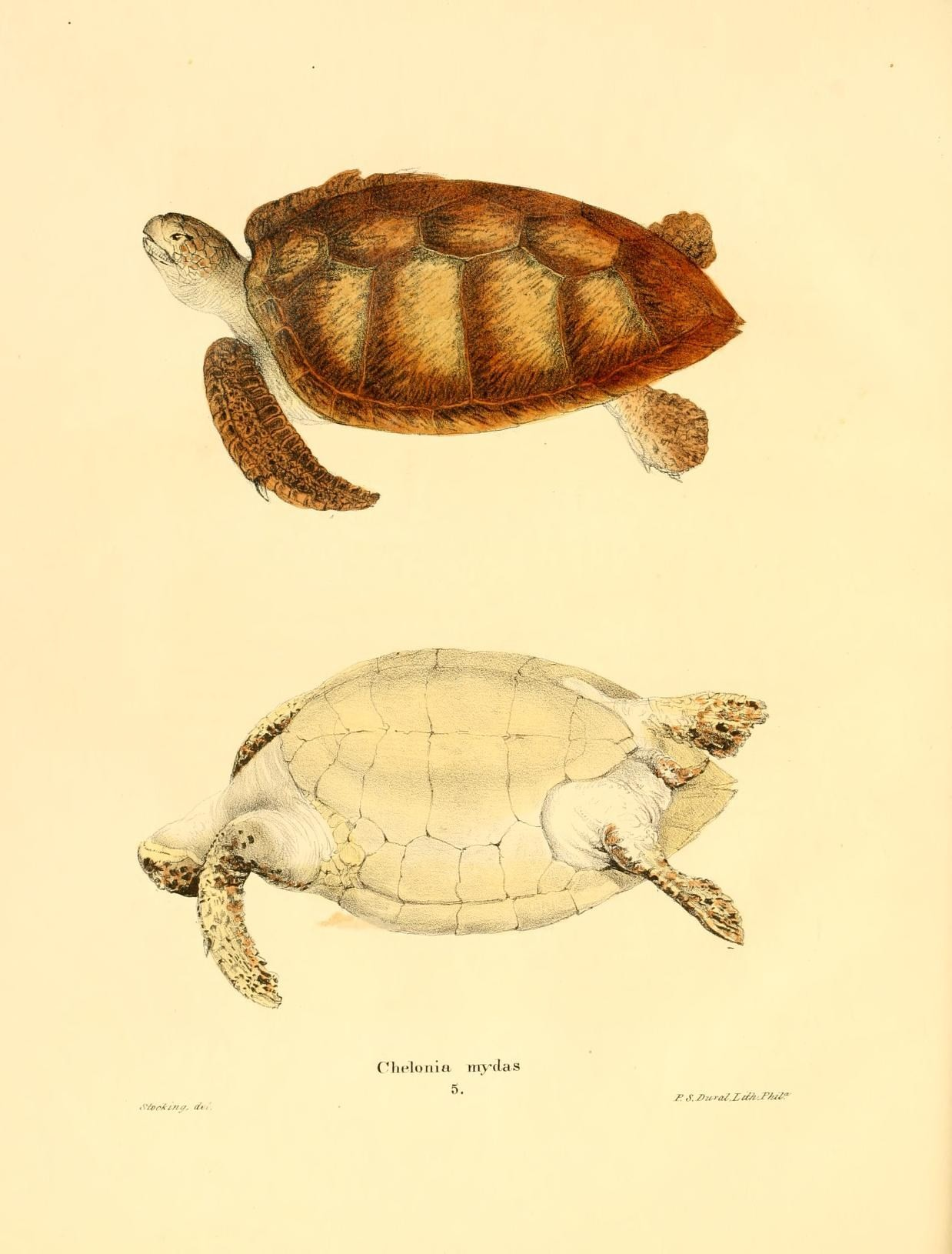
Local mythology tells of two turtles which live off the coast of Faguta, one red and one white. Green sea turtles, which are known to frequent the islands of Fiji, can actually exhibit reddish and whitish hues on their carapaces and plastrons, respectively.

Solnohu, an islet off the southern coast of Faguta roughly equidistant between its constituent districts, is the location of a significant local myth, "The turtle of Sol Onau". The myth tells of two local girls who fall from atop the island into the sea below. There, the two were transformed into sea turtles, one red and one white. Local beliefs hold that these two turtles, called 'Eao', continue to live around the coral of the rock and will resurface if a particular chant is performed.

Eao manuse, ka Lepiteala
Ai, ma vehia ka foro ole tufe,
Havei, ma foiak ta ka fau paufu,
He ta jauaki, ma moiea. Pete.

— Traditional chant for sea turtles from "The Natives of Rotuma", (1898).

J. Stanley Gardiner, who visited the island and wrote extensively on the locals' customs and myths wrote that he took Gagaj Mou, the chief of Pepjei, and five girls to recite the traditional chant. Gardiner recorded that from his vantage point out front he actually noticed the appearance of a green turtle. Green sea turtles are often located in the waters of Fiji and Rotuma.

He also recorded that Mou, the chief, as well as the others stated that they had regularly seen the turtle and that beach between Faguta and Solnohu was a frequently used feeding spot for the reptile.

==== Fagutan culture ====
Fagutan people, like all Rotumans, celebrate the traditional festival of Fara. This involves the residents of Faguta's villages (Juju, Tuại, Haga, Ujia, Uạnheta, and Avave) visiting other village communities, singing and dancing, where they are often invited inside by the local hosts. In exchange, the guests are served watermelon as a sort of reward for providing entertainment and are often doused in perfume, talcum powder, or turmeric. Across the island, these sorts of celebrations continue until mid-January. Fagutan Fara however begins much later in December (on December 24) than celebrations held elsewhere on the island.

==== Notable Fagutans ====
The term "Fagutan" commonly refers to those who live in the two Fagutan districts (Juju and Pepjei) or those with cultural or family ties to the area. Notable examples include:

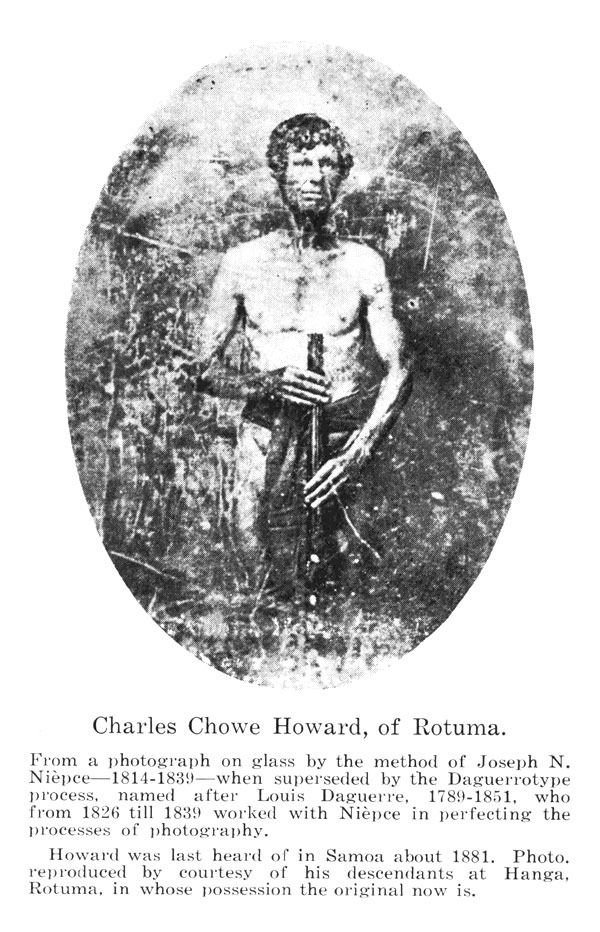
Charles Chowe Howard, a Fagutan resident and forefather of much of Haga's population.

- Charles Chowe Howard: beachcomber and longtime resident of Faguta. The village of Haga (written as "Hanga") in Juju was said to be primarily populated by Howard's own descendants, and it was theorised by the Acting-Resident Commissioner of Rotuma W.E. Russell that this bloodline contributed to these Fagutans' paler complexions when compared with other Pacific islanders and their referring to themselves as "white" and other islanders as "black men".
- Christine Rovoi: journalist, essayist, and writer in Fiji and New Zealand. Rovoi was born in Suva but with Fagutan ties was taught Rotuman using the French-based orthography used in Faguta.

== See also ==
- List of volcanoes in Fiji
- Rotuma Airport
- Rotuman New Zealanders
