= Gagaja =

Gagaja [ŋaŋatʃa] is a Rotuman word denoting the position of "Chief" or "Lord". This could be a formal chiefly position in one of the seven districts (gagaj 'es itu'u) or a village chief (fa 'es ho'aga) as well as to anyone else, such as the Chairman of the Rotuma Island Council (Gagaj Jeaman ta) to whom respect and deference is owed based on their own skills and attributes. Unlike in many other Pacific cultures, the official chiefly positions are not allocated according to any strict primogeniture, but rather are elected from all eligible males within certain kạinaga (family or clan groups) to whom the chiefly title belongs.

== Chiefs in Rotuma ==
In modern Rotuma, gagaja is the major traditional leadership position, other than mata or district representatives. Gagaja exist at two levels:

=== Gagaj 'es itu'u ===
These are the district chiefs, who represent each of the seven districts on the Rotuma Island Council, the main deliberative body for the island of Rotuma. In addition to these duties, they oversee the day-to-day life of the district, assembling villagers to assist in large projects, which he organises with the consensus given by villagers in village meetings, which he chairs. The district chiefs are ranked, and served kava and food in ceremonial settings in an order dictated by their serving rank. The serving rank is determined by the role they played in the last war. Given that Rotuma hasn't seen any war since the Rotuman Religious Wars, this order hasn't changed since 1878. The order is:

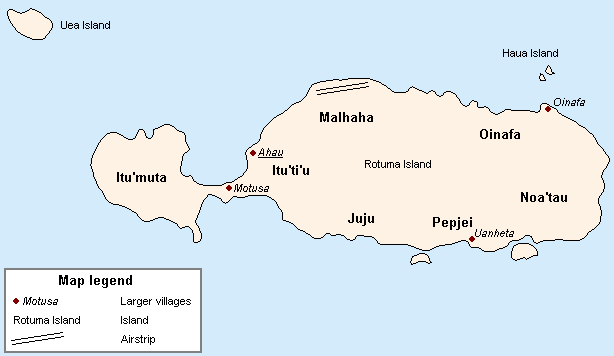

- Noa'tau
- Oinafa
- Itu'ti'u
- Malhaha
- Pepjei
- Juju
- Itu'muta

This order reflects the Wesleyan Methodist alliance between Noa'tau, Oinafa, Itu'ti'u and Malhaha which won the last conflict, whereas the latter serving of Pepjei and Juju (collectively known as Fag'uta) and Itu'muta indicates that they were defeated as part of the unsuccessful Catholic alliance. Given the inter-district political instability following that war, Rotuma was ceded to Great Britain in 1881 at the behest of the English Wesleyan missionaries.

Many chiefly positions come with titles, known as 'as togi, which belong to the chiefly mosega of the district. The mosega (literally 'bed') is a group of often three or four clans (kạinaga) who are descendants of the original ancestral title-holder. Upon the death of a chief, the new chief is selected from amongst the members of the mosega to whom the title belongs. Ideally the title should evenly rotate amongst the kạinaga of the chiefly mosega, however the modern process is often politicized.

The second ranking title in each district is the fạufisi, who acts as an administrative official together with the gagaj 'es itu'u, and deputizes for him in his absence.

=== Fa 'es ho'aga ===
The ho'aga ('village') is an administrative unit consisting of clusters of households forming cooperating working groups, and these work efforts are directed by the fa 'es ho'aga ('man with village' in the Rotuman language). Fa 'es ho'aga are appointed from the chiefly mosega of the village and the position also usually comes with an ‘as togi (chiefly title).

== In religion ==
In Christianity, Gagaja is often translated as meaning 'Lord', as in "Lord God" (Gagaj Aitu).
