= Rotumans =

Indigenous peoples from Rotuma

Rotumans Rotuạm Ro
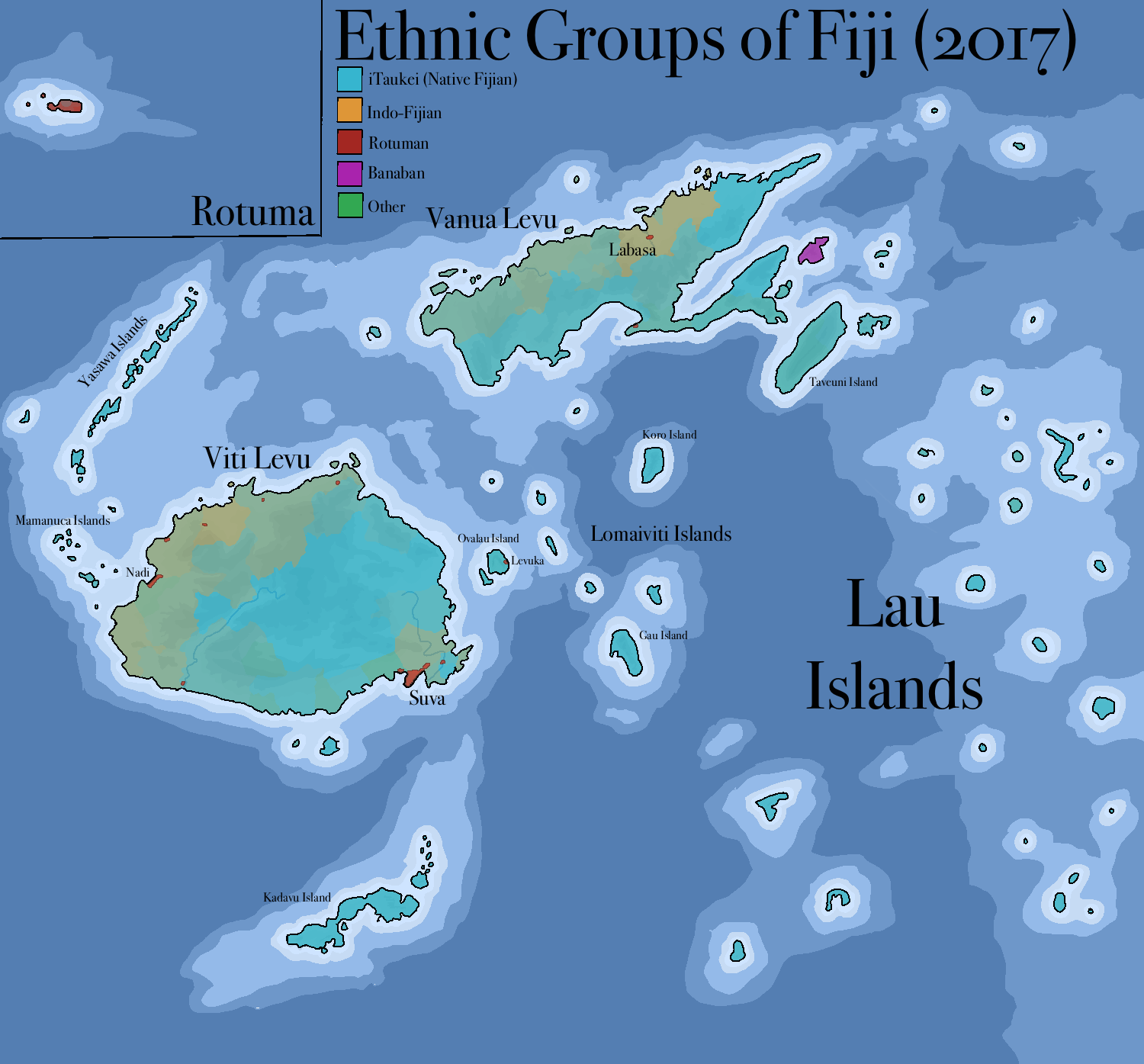
- Rotumans distribution in Fiji (2017 census)

Total population
- c. 25,000

Regions with significant populations
- Fiji (Rotuma): unknown
- New Zealand: 1,323
- Australia: 550 - 1,000

Languages
- Rotuman, English

Religion
- Methodism, Seventh-day Adventist, Roman Catholicism

Related ethnic groups
- Samoans, Tongans, Fijians, other Pacific peoples

The Rotumans (Rotuman: Rotuạm; Fijian: Ro) are a Polynesian ethnic group native to Rotuma, an island group forming part of Fiji. The island itself is a cultural melting pot at the crossroads of the Micronesian, Melanesian and Polynesian divisions of the Pacific Ocean, and due to the seafaring nature of traditional Pacific cultures, the indigenous Rotuman have adopted or share many aspects of its multifaceted culture with its Melanesian, Micronesian and Polynesian neighbours.

== Ancestors ==
According to records, Rotuma was first inhabited by people from Tahiti Nui, the Marquesas Islands and Rapa Nui. At that time, it was known as 'Siria'. Little is known about the exact years of migration from these far-flung Eastern kingdoms. The only known information was that these three kingdoms used Rotuma as a royal burial ground for their kings and queens. The indigenous peoples of Tahiti Nui and Rapa Nui knew Rotuma as Siria because it was named after the star that lies directly above the island's location. Thus, the people prayed to Tagaroa Siria, meaning 'God of Siria'. To commemorate this ancient royal burial ground, a species of seaweed was adopted as a symbol of the blood ties between Tahiti Nui and Rotuma. This species of seaweed is a delicacy in the region, but only grows in Tahiti and Rotuma. A princess from Bora Bora gave this seaweed species.

== Physical appearance ==
By most accounts, Rotumans are closely related to their neighbours from Tahiti, Samoa and Tonga. Rotumans are generally noted as being of a light olive to medium brown complexion, with generally wavy black hair, although some individuals have naturally copper-ginger colouring to their hair. Traditionally, men kept their hair shoulder length or longer; however, post-colonial Rotumans look unfavorably on this. They are on average shorter than their Tongan or Samoan neighbours, and less prone to obesity.

The appearance of some individuals more clearly indicates Tahitians (French Polynesia) heritage evidenced by darker skin and curlier hair, and some people show decidedly Native American facial characteristics, such as long, oval-shaped eyes and straight hair.

Rotuman people can point to at least one white ancestor (usually from England or the United States) since European arrival. This can be attributed to the high ratio of whites to Rotumans in the early days of exposure to white people, when Rotuma became a haven to mutineers and stow-aways who appreciated the beauty of the island and found prosperity as the trading advisers to local chiefs when dealing with Occidental ships.

== Rotuman society ==
Rotuman society is one based more on democracy than most other Pacific cultures. While somewhat stratified, Rotuman culture maintains no class distinctions such as in Fijian or Tongan systems, no noble caste, and no sense of primogeniture. The strength of Rotuman society is the high communal nature of activities. Every Rotuman person maintains a strong affinity for their community, and this is evidenced through participation in large-scale projects (kato'aga) and communal property, such as for agriculture. Rotuman society can be divided, in the broadest sense, into seven itu'u, or districts, each of which is headed up by a male chief, referred to as "gagaj 'es itu'u". It is his role to guide the community's communal works, and represent his constituents as a member of the Rotuma Island Council (RIC).

== Rotumans as a Pacific people ==
Rotumans are Polynesians by most accounts, most physically resembling the Polynesian people of Tahiti, Samoa, and Tonga (which are commonly attributed in Rotuman mythology as the true parent civilizations). But Rotuman musical tradition, prior to European and Central Polynesian influence, consisted primarily of chanting similar to traditional Tahitian or Maori styles (see Tautoga and Himene), both very distant cultures. In addition, many of characteristics of the Rotuman language distance it from Polynesian neighbours with it aligning it more closely with Melanesian (particularly Western Fijian) languages.
