= Rotuman language =

Language

Rotuman
- Fäeag Rotuạm
- Native to: Fiji
- Region: Rotuma
- Ethnicity: Rotumans
- Native speakers: 7,500 (2002)
- Language family: Austronesian: Malayo-Polynesian; Central–Eastern Malayo-Polynesian?; Eastern Malayo-Polynesian; Oceanic; Central–Eastern Oceanic?; Central Pacific; West Fijian – Rotuman; Rotuman

Official status
- Official language in: Rotuma, Fiji
- Recognised minority language in: Fiji

Language codes
- ISO 639-3: rtm
- Glottolog: rotu1241
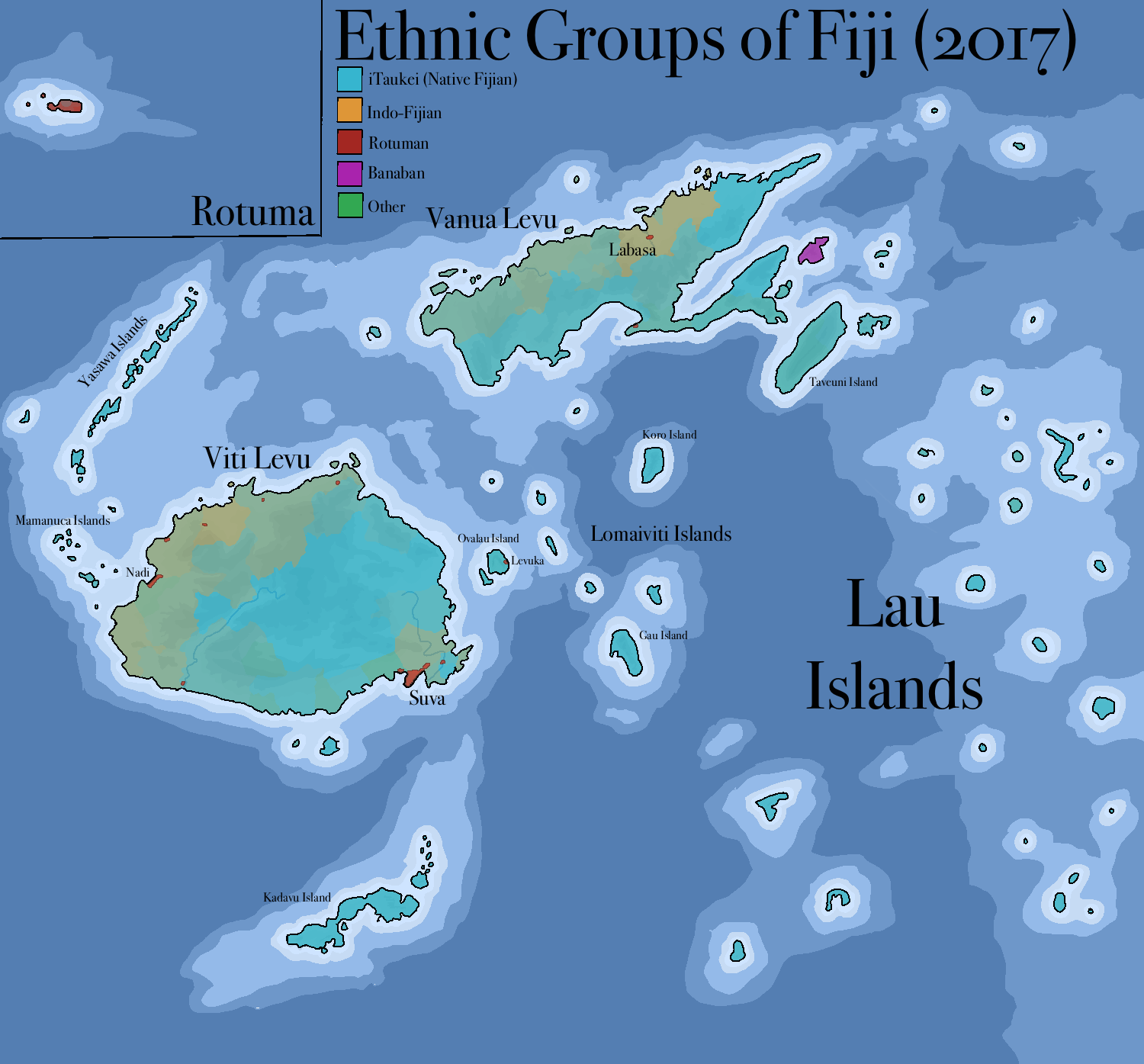
- Rotumans distribution in Fiji (2017 census)

- Rotuman is classified as Vulnerable by the UNESCO Atlas of the World's Languages in Danger.

Rotuman, also referred to as Rotunan, Rutuman or Fäeag Rotuạm (citation form: Faega Rotuma), is an Austronesian language spoken by the Indigenous Rotuman people in the South Pacific. Linguistically, as well as culturally, Rotuma has had a Polynesian influence in its culture and was incorporated as a dependency into the Colony of Fiji in 1881. Contemporary Rotuman is a result of significant Polynesian borrowing, following Samoan and Tongan migrations into Rotuma.

The Rotuman language has sparked much interest with linguists because the language uses metathesis to invert the ultimate vowel in a word with the immediately preceding consonant, resulting in a vowel system characterized by umlaut, vowel shortening or extending and diphthongization.

Unlike its Pacific neighbors, Rotuman is typically considered an AVO (agent–verb–object) language.

== Phonology ==
Consonants
	Labial	Coronal	Post- alveolar	Velar	Glottal
Nasal	m	n		ŋ	
Stop	p	t	tʃ	k	ʔ
Fricative	f v	s			h
Liquid		r l			

Vowels
	Front	Back
Close	i	u
Mid	ɛ	ɔ
Open		a

Rotuman has no phonemic vowel length and is underlyingly a language of open syllables. Thus, only consonant + vowel syllables exist in the underlying syllable structure, although phonological processes provide for more variation. A minimal word constraint that disallows words of less than two moras also alters this underlying representation. Except for words from non-lexical categories, a word like /ka/ ('tomorrow') is realized as [kaa]. That constraint applies before word compounding (including reduplication as well): /fu/ ('coral reef') + /liʔu/ ('deep sea') → [fuuˈliʔu] ('deep sea pool'). Vowels are also lengthened when both final and stressed.

Non-high vowels are raised when they are followed by a syllable with a high vowel.

- /ɛ/ → [e]
- /a/ → [ɔ]
- /ɔ/ → [o]

Generally speaking, when /a/ is followed by /ɛ/ within a metrical foot, it is fronted to [æ].

complete	incomplete	gloss
[tuˈturu]	[tuˈtur]	'post...'
[ˈmosɛ]	[ˈmøs]	'to sleep...'
[ˈpikɔ]	[ˈpiɔk]	'lazy'

An important aspect of Rotuman morphonology is what could be called the "incomplete" and "complete" phases although they have also been referred to as "long" and "short" forms, "primary" and "secondary" forms, "absolute" and "construct" cases, and "proper and original" and "altered or construct" forms. The complete phase applies to semantically-definite or specific terms. Otherwise, in normal conversation (excluding song, poetry and chant), the incomplete phase applies to all but the last morpheme of a word and all but the last word of a phrase. That can lead to syllable-final consonants in the language, which has an underlying all-open syllable system.

- ⫽mafa⫽ ('eyes') + ⫽huhu⫽ ('take off') → /mafhuhu/ → [mɔfhuh] ('minutely')

	i	ɛ	a	ɔ	u
i	iC	jɛC	jɔC	juC	iC
ɛ	eC	ɛC	jaC	ɛC	ɛC
a	æC	æC	aC	aC	ɔC
ɔ	øC	œC	waC	ɔC	oC
u	yC	wɛC	wɔC	wɔC	uC

The above table (C indicates any consonant) shows that metathesis and deletion are important parts of incomplete phase formation. The final vowel and the immediately-preceding consonant metathesize from V_{1}CV_{2}#, to V_{1}V_{2}C# where V_{1} is any underlying penultimate vowel, V_{2} is any underlying ultimate vowel, C is any consonant, and # is the word, phrase, or morpheme boundary.

After metathesis, "V_{2} is deleted if V_{1} is not further back than V_{2} and if V_{2} is not lower than V_{1}" or if the two vowels are identical. Further processes of elision result in coalescence or spreading of features: back vowels are fronted before front vowels of equal or greater height (/ɛ/ and/or /i/ affect /ɔ/ and just /i/ affects /u/) before the latter are deleted.

- /u/ → [y]
- [o] → [ø~œ]

In addition, the /a/ → [æ] rule takes effect again, now outside of the moraic foot, and can occur with a following /i/ and both /ɛ/. Also, /a/ becomes [ɔ] after a syllable with a high vowel (/i/ or /u/). When V_{1} is higher than V_{2}, it is devocalized to the corresponding semivowel; [j] for front vowels and [w] for back vowels.

Word stress is associated with left-dominant bimoraic feet. The penultimate mora of nonderived words carries the stress. Other than the nominalizing suffix ⫽-ŋa⫽ and the causative suffix ⫽-ʔaki⫽, stress is assigned before additional morphemes are affixed and before incomplete phase morphonology.

== Orthography ==
Upon missionary contact, various orthographies were used on the island of Rotuma. The French Catholic missionaries devised an orthography based on their own alphabet, and the primarily-English Wesleyan Methodist preachers developed their own orthography to write in Rotuman. The prevalent one used today is one from the Australian Methodist Reverend C. M. Churchward, whose knowledge of linguistics helped him to devise the Tongan orthography as well. Here is the alphabet, as it appears in Churchward's seminal work, Rotuman Grammar and Dictionary:

- a – /a/

- ȧ or ä – [a] ~ [æ]
- ạ – [ɔ]

- e – /e/
- f – /f/
- g – /ŋ/
- h – /h/
- i – /i/
- j – /tʃ/
- k – /k/
- l – /l/
- m – /m/
- n – /n/
- o – /ɔ/

- ö – [ø]

- p – /p/
- s – /s/
- t – /t/
- u – /u/

- ü – [y]

- v – /v/
- ʻ – /ʔ/ the glottal stop

For the variations to the vowels a, o and i, Churchward's dictionary treats these letters as if no variation between the species occurred within the base letter: the word päega, meaning seat, appears before pạri meaning banana, which, in turn, appears before pau, meaning very much.

In addition, there are instances of all original vowels above appearing with a macron, indicating that they are longer, although vowel length is arguably a phonological process.

Because Churchward's alphabet was created before a sufficient analysis of Rotuman phonology, it is not purely phonemic. George Milner proposed a more phonemic orthography without diacritics, which incorporates the understanding of vowel allophony as having to do with metathesis (see above)

Churchward		IPA	Milner	Gloss
complete	incomplete	IPA	incomplete	Gloss
mose	mös	[møs]	moes	'sleep'
futi	füt	[fyt]	fuit	'pull'
a+su	ạ+s	[ɔs]	aus	'steam'
a+ti	ȧt	[æt]	ait	'gather (shellfish)'

== Samples ==
This is the Rotuman language version of the Lord's Prayer, as found in the translation of the Bible published in 1975 (Matthew 6:9–13). It is written using the diacritics of Churchward's orthography:

ʻOtomis Öʻfaat täe ʻe lạgi,
ʻOu asa la äfʻȧk la maʻmaʻ,
ʻOu pureʻaga la leum, ʻou rere la sok,
fak ma ʻe lạgi, la tapeʻma ʻe rän teʻ.
ʻÄe la naam se ʻạmisa, ʻe terạnit ʻe ʻi,
ta ʻetemis telaʻa la tạumar,
Ma ʻäe la fạuʻạkia teʻ ne ʻotomis sara,
la fak ma ne ʻạmis tapeʻma re vạhia se iris ne sar se ʻạmisag.
Ma ʻäe se hoaʻ ʻạmis se faksara; ʻäe la sạiʻạkia ʻạmis ʻe raksaʻa.
Ko pureʻaga, ma neʻneʻi, ma kolori, mou ma ke se ʻäeag, se av se ʻes gataʻag ne tore. ʻEmen

== Bibliography ==
- Blevins, Juliette (1994), "The Bimoraic Foot in Rotuman Phonology and Morphology", Oceanic Linguistics, 33 (2), University of Hawai'i Press: 491–516, doi:10.2307/3623138, JSTOR 3623138
- Churchward, C.M. (2003), "The History of Rotuma as Reflected in its Language", Oceanic Linguistics, 9 (1), University of Hawai'i Press: 79–88
- Churchward, C.M. (1940), Rotuman Grammar and Dictionary, Sydney: Methodist Church of Australasia
- Milner, George B. (1971), "Fijian and Rotuman", in Thomas A. Sebeok (ed.), Current Trends in Linguistics, vol. 8: The Languages of Oceania, The Hague: Mouton, pp. 397–425
- Saito, Mamoru (1981), A Preliminary Account of the Rotuman Vowel System, Cambridge: MIT Press
- Schmidt, Hans (2003), "Temathesis in Rotuman" (PDF), in John Lynch (ed.), Issues in Austronesian Historical Phonology, Pacific Linguistics Research School of Pacific and Asian Studies, pp. 175–207, ISBN 978-0-85883-503-0
