= Noaʻtau =

District of Rotuma, Fiji

Coordinates: 12°31′13.13″S 177°7′55.15″E

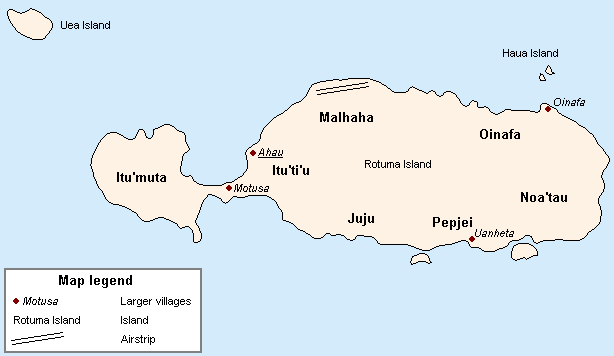
Map showing districts of Rotuma

Noaʻtau is one of the seven districts on the island of Rotuma, a dependency of Fiji. According to the 2017 census, the district had a population of 125 inhabitants.

It includes the villages of Kalvaka, ʻUtʻutu, Matuea, Maragteu, Fafaisina, and Fekeoko.

Noaʻtau is the most-easterly district on the island. Because Rotuma's chiefly system is often (incorrectly) associated with Fijian precepts of chiefdom by Westerners, it is considered the "chiefly" village on the island, because its chiefs are traditionally assigned first service in the Rotuman kava ceremony, ever since their victory for the Wesleyan missionaries' side in the Rotuman Religious Wars of the 19th century.
