= Cinema of Fiji =

- No. of screens: 30

Produced feature films (2009)
- Fictional: 1
- Animated: -
- Documentary: -

Fiji only began producing its own feature films in 2004, and has produced just one to date. Vilsoni Hereniko's The Land Has Eyes (2004) is set in Rotuma and stars indigenous Rotuman actress Sapeta Taito in her début role, alongside New Zealand actress Rena Owen.

2004 was also the year in which the film Reel Paradise (United States) was produced. The film depicts the real-life story of American independent filmmaker John Pierson, who, in 2002, took his wife and two children to the island of Taveuni in Fiji to live for a year, and used a vacant cinema to show films free of charge.

Boot Camp (2007), starring Mila Kunis and Peter Stormare, is partly set in Fiji, but is not a Fiji-made film.

Although Fiji has only ever produced one film, the Fiji Audio Visual Commission aims to attract foreign film-makers and incite them to use the country as a setting. The Commission stated in July 2008 that it hoped Fiji would become known as "Bulawood", the Hollywood of the South Seas.

Fiji has a large ethnic Indian minority, and Bollywood films are popular both among Indo-Fijians and indigenous Fijians, with some being dubbed in Fijian.

== See also ==
- Cinema of the world
- World cinema
- List of Oceania films
