= Marjorie Crocombe =

Cook Islands author and educator (1930–2022)

Dr Marjorie Tuainekore Tere Crocombe OBE
- Born: 19 June 1930; Rarotonga, Cook Islands
- Died: 21 July 2022 (aged 92)
- Education: University of the South Pacific; University of Hawaiʻi; University of Papua New Guinea; University of California, Los Angeles
- Occupations: Academic; author
- Spouse: Ron Crocombe
- Writing career
- Language: English, Cook Islands Māori
- Notable work: If I Live: the story of Ta'unga
- Notable awards: Order of the British Empire (OBE)

Marjorie Tuainekore Tere Crocombe OBE (née Hosking; 19 June 1930 – 21 July 2022) was an author and academic from the Cook Islands. She was the Cook Islands' "most venerated living author".

== Early life and education ==
Marjorie Crocombe was born in 1930 in Rarotonga, in the Cook Islands. Her parents were Dr. Rupert and Vaevae Hosking. Her early education was at Titikaveka Primary School, Rarotonga (1936–44). In 1944 she won a Maui Pomare scholarship to finish her secondary schooling in New Zealand, initially at Epsom Girls Grammar School (1945–6) and later at Whanganui Girls College where she became the first Polynesian Head Prefect (1947–50). She trained as a teacher at Ardmore Teachers Training College (1951–2) and after a year's teaching at Henderson Primary School, Auckland (1953–4), returned to Rarotonga to begin work for the Cook Islands Department of Education.

== Career ==
In 1955, she became the first female lecturer from the Cook Islands at Nikao Teachers College. During this time she also worked on developing primary school readers in the Cook Islands Māori language.

At a dance in 1955 she met her future partner, Ron Crocombe. Ron had come to Rarotonga initially as Clerk of Works in the Public Works Department and was then appointed as Resident Agent on Atiu.They were married in 1959 in Masterton, NZ and a 50-year partnership began.

That same year, Marjorie accompanied Ron to Canberra where he had been offered a PhD scholarship in Pacific History at the Australian National University (ANU). She was initially barred from entering Australia under the “White Australia” policy, but finally, under protest, was allowed entry.

While Ron worked on his thesis, Marjorie commenced work on The Works of Ta’unga; Records of a Polynesian Traveller in the Southern Seas, 1833–1896 (Australian National University Press, 1968). This work, (co-edited with Ron) “combined the two strands of ethnohistory and an Islands-focused historiography” to become one of the foundational texts of Pacific History (Lal and Munro 2006).

In 1962, Ron and Marjorie and their family moved to live and work in Papua New Guinea following Ron's appointment as Executive Officer, and from 1965, Director of Australian National University's New Guinea Research Unit. In Port Moresby, Marjorie became a lecturer at the Teachers College and the Administrative College, as well as conducting a regular ABC radio broadcast “Malanga Moana” covering Pacific music and current affairs (1966–9).

In 1965 during sabbatical, she undertook a part-time Anthropology degree at the University of California, Los Angeles and in 1968, studies in Pacific history at the University of Hawaiʻi.

In 1967 she began a degree at the University of Papua New Guinea (UPNG), studying creative writing under Ulli and Georgina Beier and undertook research into the work of the influential Mangaian missionaries to Papua, Ruatoka and his wife Tungane. All this was achieved in addition to bringing up 2 children without added help, for Ron and Marjorie refused on principle to employ domestic servants.

In 1969 the family moved to Suva, following Ron's appointment as Foundation Professor of Pacific Studies at the newly established University of the South Pacific. At the University of the South Pacific, Marjorie completed her Arts degree majoring in History and Education. Influenced by her creative writing teachers at University of Papua New Guinea, she helped establish and became first President of the South Pacific Creative Arts Society (SPACS), a post she retained for 23 years (1977 – 2000).

SPACS provided a platform for a ‘New Wave of Pacific Writers’ through its journal Mana with Marjorie as Editor. Many of the early writers published in Mana, including Albert Wendt, Konai Thaman, the late Alistair Te Ariki Campbell and the late Grace Molisa, were or became, well-known writers and scholars.

In 1974 Marjorie completed her Master of Arts degree at University of Papua New Guinea with a dissertation entitled - Maretu’s Narrative of Cook Islands History - later published as Cannibals and Converts Radical Change in the Cook Islands (USP Press, 1983).

At USP, both Ron and Marjorie were indefatigable advocates of a decentralized university with Ron writing and teaching the first ever degree level correspondence course offered by USP Extension, An Introduction to Pacific Land Tenure in 1974. At the same time, Marjorie worked as Director of the Fiji Extension Centre, then at the Solomon Islands Extension Service, and finally as Director of the University of the South Pacific Extension Studies (1983–88), with responsibility for delivering extension studies to the university's 12 member countries.

Following her retirement from the University of the South Pacific in 1988, Marjorie was appointed Senior Lecturer and Foundation Director at the Centre for Pacific Studies at the University of Auckland (1990 – 1993).

Returning to the Cook Islands she was appointed Deputy Chair of the Cook Islands Media Council, a member of the Biodiversity Committee, and of the Education Sector Review, the Higher Appointments Committee, the Cultural and Historic Places Trust, and the Cook Islands Research Association while also supporting innumerable non-governmental organizations and lecturing at University of the South Pacific Cook Islands.

Following Ron's death in 2009, she co-edited (with Rod Dixon and Linda Crowl) a book on his life and work, entitled Ron Crocombe: E Toa : Pacific Writings to Celebrate His Life and Work.

Late into retirement, Crocombe continued to champion poetry and literature, and, as Rachel Reeves noted, remained “outspoken about encouraging Pacific writers to analyse contemporary life through poetry, art and stories.” This bore added fruit in 2003 with the publication of the 400 page Akono’anga Māori – Cook Islands Culture featuring 25 local authors writing on aspects of Cook Islands culture, economy and society, followed in 2016 by Art and Architecture of the Cook Islands (co-edited again with Rod Dixon and Linda Crowl).

Among her honours, Crocombe was named by Island Business their 1990 Pacific Islands Woman of the Year, and in 2000 the Cook Islands Business and Professional Women's Association as their Woman of the Year. In the 2009 New Year Honours List, Marjorie was appointed Officer of the Order of the British Empire (OBE) for services to the Cook Islands, the Pacific, education, literature and the community

In 2011, her alma mater University of the South Pacific honoured her with the award of a Doctor of Letters (honoris causa) in recognition of “her exceptional academic, literary and community achievements”. The citation included 6 full pages recording all of Marjorie's published works covering subject areas including Pacific History, Pacific Literature, Education, Current Affairs, Information Technology, and Pacific Women as well as 22 edited publications.

On the university's 50th Anniversary in 2018, USP Cook Islands celebrated Crocombe pivotal role in the development of Pacific Literature with publication of the book Mana – 50 Years of Cook Islands Writing, a tribute to Marjorie Crocombe.

In the same year, Crocombe fulfilled another goal by successfully lobbying the university to develop a full degree programme in the Cook Islands Māori language. The degree was introduced in 2018 and once established, was followed by Tongan and Niuafo'ou, Vagahau Niue, and Rotuman. The first students with a Diploma in Cook Islands Māori graduated in 2021.

In 2025, a book on Crocombe was published, Joan Gragg and Tricia Thompson both noted Marjorie’s significant contributions to Cook Islands Māori language's preservation and education. The book was decorated with paintings by Joan Gragg and Mahiriki Tangaroa.

== Death ==
Crocombe died on 21 July 2022.

She is survived by three children, six grandsons and four great-grandchildren.

== Select Bibliography ==
=== Children's and young adult ===
- If I Live: the story of Ta'unga (1980, University of South Pacific Press)
- Cannibals and Converts: radical change in the Cook Islands (1983, University of South Pacific Press) [read online]
- They Came for Sandalwood (1974, Islands Education Division)
- Te rau maire: poems and stories of the Pacific (1992, Tauranga Vananga, Ministry of Cultural Development)

=== Non-fiction ===
- The Works of Ta’unga; Records of a Polynesian Traveller in the Southern Seas, 1833–1896 (Australian National University Press, 1968) with Ron Crocombe -download from ANU open research
- Post Secondary Education in the South Pacific: Present Patterns and Future Options (1994, Commonwealth Secretariat), with Ron Crocombe
- Ron Crocombe: E Toa: Pacific Writings to Celebrate His Life and Work (2013, University of South Pacific Press), with Rod Dixon and Linda Crowl
- Cook Islands Art and Architecture (2016, University of South Pacific Press), with Rod Dixon and Linda Crowl

Crocombe is also the author of numerous academic journal articles, including in The Contemporary Pacific, The Journal of Pacific History, Comparative Education, and The Journal of the Polynesian Society.

== Recognition ==
In the 2009 New Year Honours, Crocombe was appointed an Officer of the Order of the British Empire (OBE) for services to the Cook Islands, the Pacific, education, literature and the community.

In 2011, the University of the South Pacific honoured her with the award of a Doctor of Letters (honoris causa) in recognition of “her exceptional academic, literary and community achievements”.

Crocombe was named Pacific Islands Woman of the Year by Island Business in 1990 and the Cook Islands Business & Professional Women's Association's Woman of the Year in 2000.
