= Teresia Teaiwa =

American poet (1968–2017)

- Image of Teresia Teaiwa
- Born: Teresia Kieuea Teaiwa; August 12, 1968
- Died: March 21, 2017 (aged 48)
- Occupations: Scholar, poet, activist, mentor

Academic background
- Education: University of California, Santa Cruz University of Hawaii at Manoa Trinity Washington University

Academic work
- Doctoral students: Alice Pollard; Emelihter Kihleng; Mikaela Nyman

Teresia Kieuea Teaiwa (12 August 1968 – 21 March 2017) was an I-Kiribati and African-American scholar, poet, activist and mentor. Teaiwa was well-regarded for her ground-breaking work in Pacific Studies. Her research interests in this area embraced her artistic and political nature, and included contemporary issues in Fiji, feminism and women's activism in the Pacific, contemporary Pacific culture and arts, and pedagogy in Pacific Studies. An "anti-nuclear activist, defender of West Papuan independence, and a critic of militarism", Teaiwa solidified many connections across the Pacific Ocean and was a hugely influential voice on Pacific affairs. Her term "militourism" identified the relationship between military and tourism presence in the Pacific. Her poetry remains widely published.

Of Banaban, Tabiteuean, African American, and Rabi descent, Teaiwa was called a Kiribati "national icon" by The Guardian newspaper in 2009. A bibliography of her published works can be found in the posthumously released book, Sweat and Salt Water, compiled and edited by Katerina Teaiwa, April K. Henderson, and Terence Wesley-Smith .

== Biography ==
Teresia Kieuea Teaiwa was born in Honolulu, Hawaii and raised in Suva, Fiji. Her father was i-Kiribati from Banaba and her mother was African American. She had two sisters, Katerina Teaiwa and Maria Teaiwa-Rutherford. She attended St Joseph's Secondary School where she excelled.

Teaiwa received a Bachelor of Arts from Trinity Washington University in Washington D.C. and a Master of Arts from the University of Hawaii at Manoa. With a thesis committee of James Clifford, Angela Davis and Barbara Epstein, she completed a PhD in History of Consciousness at the University of California, Santa Cruz on, "Militarism, Tourism and the Native: Articulations in Oceania".

Throughout her career, Teaiwa maintained a full teaching schedule. In 1996, she turned down a job with Greenpeace to take up her first lecturer position at the University of the South Pacific in Suva, Fiji, at the request of Pacific Studies and Tongan scholar Epeli Hau'ofa. She taught history and politics for five years. Throughout this time, Teaiwa was part of intellectual communities that stemmed from the university environment, such as the Niu Waves Writers’ Collective, the Nuclear Free and Independent Pacific Movement, and the Citizens’ Constitutional Forum.

In 2000, she moved to New Zealand to teach the first-ever undergraduate major in Pacific studies at Victoria University as programme director. In 2016, she became director of Va’aomanū Pasifika, home to Victoria's Pacific and Samoan Studies programmes. She was also co-editor of the International Feminist Journal of Politics.

In September 2021 Teaiwa's book Sweat and Salt Water, was published in New Zealand by Victoria University of Wellington Press and simultaneously by the University of Hawai'i Press as part of their Pacific Islands Monograph Series. The book is a selection of some of her most notable essays, poems, and scholarly articles regarding her major contributions and commitment to the Pacific region and its peoples. The title of the book is derived from a quote that was requested by Hau'ofa for his 1988 essay The Ocean in Us, in which she stated, "We sweat and cry salt water, so we know the ocean is really in our blood." Teaiwa is profiled in the young readers book titled We are Here.

=== Awards ===
In 2010 Teaiwa received the Macaulay Distinguished Lecture Award from the University of Hawai’i. In 2014 she received the Victoria University of Wellington Teaching Excellence Award and was the first Pasifika woman awarded the national Ako Aotearoa Tertiary Teaching Excellence Award. In 2015 she won the Pacific People's Award for Education.

Teaiwa's legacy at Victoria University of Wellington includes a number of successful teaching initiatives, including ‘Akamai’ for 100-level students, in which students can choose to present their work with a creative interpretation. Teaiwa believed that Akamai helped students to understand that art and performance are part of the intellectual heritage of the Pacific.

== Death and legacy ==
Teaiwa died of cancer on 21 March 2017. She survived by her husband and two children. In 2017, the Victoria University of Wellington established the Teresia Teaiwa Memorial Scholarship for undergraduate and postgraduate students of Pacific Islander descent who are studying Pacific Studies at the University.

== Partial bibliography ==
=== Academic ===
A compendium of Teresia Teaiwa's work available on open access has been compiled by Alex Golub. In addition, a posthumously published collection of her writings, Sweat and Salt Water: Selected Works, was published by University of Hawai'i Press in August 2021.

Sole-Authored Pieces

- 2015. What Makes Fiji Women Soldiers? Context, Context, Context. Intersections: Gender and Sexuality in Asia and the Pacific 37.
- 2014. Porirua market with Susana and Jessie, 2009 and a trip to market with Margaret,
- 2013. “Dyed in Paru”, “Makariri”, and “Draft Manifesto for a Feminist Asthmatic in Aotearoa” (three poems). 4th Floor Literary Journal.
- 2012. disarmed (13 poems, including audio). Queensland Art Gallery for the Asia Pacific Triennial.
- 2012. Good neighbour, big brother, kin? New Zealand's foreign policy in the contemporary pacific. In Tangata o le Moana : New Zealand and the people of the Pacific edited by Sean Mallon, Kolokesa Māhina-Tuai and Damon Salesa. pp. 241–263.
- 2010. The Thing About It Is... (Part of Special Section “Essays in Honor of Epeli Hau‘ofa”). The Contemporary Pacific 22 (1): 105-108.
- 2007. In “Baninnur: A Basket of Food, 2014″. Black Market Press 36.
- 2007. niudity (I-IV). Pacific Studies 30(3&4):103-105.
- 2006. On Analogies: Rethinking the Pacific in a Global Context. The Contemporary Pacific 18 (1): 71-87.
- 2006. The Classroom as Metaphorical Canoe: Co-operative Learning in Pacific Studies. World Indigenous Nations Higher Education Consortium.
- 2005. Articulated Cultures: Militarism and Masculinities in Fiji During the Min 1990s. Fijian Studies 3(2): 201-222
- 2004. Review of The Network Inside Out, by Annelise Riles. The Contemporary Pacific 16 (2): 443-45.
- 2002. Review of Te Rii ni Banaba. Journal of the Polynesian Society 111(4):402-405.
- 2001. An Analysis of The Current Political Crisis in Fiji. In Coup: Reflections on the Political Crisis in Fiji, edited by Brij Lal and Michael Peters, p. 31-34. Canberra: Pandanus Press. (N.B. This link is to the 2008 reissue of this book by ANU Epress).
- 2001. L(o)osing the Edge. Special issue, The Contemporary Pacific 13 (2): 343-57.
- 2001. Review of Compassionate Exile by Bob Madey and Larry Thomas. The Contemporary Pacific 13 (1): 302-06.
- 2000. Review of Gauguin's Skirt, by Stephen F. Eisenman. Pacific Studies 23(1&2):103-111.
- 1997. Review of Speaking to Power: Gender and Politics in the Western Pacific, by Lynn B Wilson. The Contemporary Pacific 9 (1): 290-94.
- 1997. Learning...to Love it: Some thoughts on Teaching History. The History Teacher: Magazine of the Queensland History Teachers’ Association 35(1):1-7.
- 1996. Review of A New Oceania: Rediscovering Our Sea of Islands, edited by Eric Waddell, Vijay Naidu, and Epeli Hau’ofa. The Contemporary Pacific 8 (1): 214-17.
- 1994. bikinis and other s/pacific n/oceans. The Contemporary Pacific 6 (1): 87-109.

Co-Authored

- 2016. Dvorak, Greg, Delihna Ehmes, Evile Feleti, James Perez Viernes, and Teresia Teaiwa. Gender in the Pacific. Volume 2 of Teaching Oceania Series, edited by Monica LaBriola. Honolulu: Center for Pacific Islands Studies, University of Hawai‘i–Mānoa.
- 2013. Teaiwa, T. and Slatter, Claire. Samting nating: Pacific waves at the margins of feminist security studies. International Studies Perspectives, 14(4):447-450.
- 2012. Kihleng, E. and Teaiwa, T. Review of The Orator/O Le Tulafale [feature film]. The Contemporary Pacific 24 (2): 434-438.
- 2010. Teaiwa, T., and Marsh, S. T. Albert Wendt's Critical and Creative Legacy in Oceania: An Introduction. The Contemporary Pacific 22 (2): 233-248.
- 2006. Fairbairn-Dunlop, Peggy; Asmar, Christine; Teaiwa, Teresia; Davidson-Toumu’a, Ruth. Inventory of Pacific Research at Victoria University of Wellington 1999-2005. Faculty of Humanities and Social Sciences: Victoria University of Wellington.
- 2006. Teaiwa, Teresia and Malakai Koloamatangi. Democracy and Its Prospects in the Pacific. In Pacific Futures, edited by Michael Powles, 20-35. Canberra: Pandanus Books.
- 2005. Teaiwa, Teresia and Sean Mallon. Ambivalent Kinships? Pacific People in New Zealand. In New Zealand Identities: Departures and Destinations, edited by James H. Liu et al., 207-229.
- 1994. Ochoa, María and Teresia Teaiwa. Introduction to “Enunciating our Terms: Women of Color in Collaboration and Conflict”. Inscriptions 7.
- James Liu, Tim McCreanor, Tracey McIntosh and Teresia Teaiwa (eds), New Zealand Identities: Departures and Destinations. Wellington: Victoria University Press, 2005.

=== Literary ===
- Teaiwa, Teresia. Searching for Nei Nim'anoa (poetry), Suva: Mana Publications, 1995
- Teaiwa, Teresia. I can see Fiji: poetry and sound (CD of poetry), featuring Des Mallon, sound design by Hinemoana Baker, 2008
- Teaiwa, Teresia and Siga Figiel. Terenesia: Amplified poetry and songs (CD of poetry and music), 2000
- Vilsoni Hereniko and Teresia Teaiwa, Last virgin in paradise: a serious comedy, 2001, ISBN 982-02-0317-1
- Teaiwa, Teresia. "Real Natives Talk about Love" (creative non-fiction), in Niu Voices: Contemporary Pacific Fiction 1. Wellington: Huia, 2006: 35–40. ISBN 1-86969-254-3
- Teaiwa, Teresia. Sweat and Salt Water (Book), 2021 ISBN 9781776564347
