= List of Fijian submissions for the Academy Award for Best International Feature Film =

Best International Feature Film submissions from Fiji

Highlights
- Debut: 2005
- Submissions: 1
- Nominations: none
- Oscar winners: none

Fiji is one of the one hundred countries that has submitted films for the Academy Award for Best International Feature Film, (Note: The category was previously named the Academy Award for Best Foreign Language Film, but this was changed to the Academy Award for Best International Feature Film in April 2019, after the Academy deemed the word "Foreign" to be outdated.) with their first and only submission made in 2005. The award is handed out annually by the United States Academy of Motion Picture Arts and Sciences to a feature-length motion picture produced outside the United States that contains primarily non-English dialogue. It was not created until the 1956 Academy Awards, in which a competitive Academy Award of Merit, known as the Best Foreign Language Film Award, was created for non-English speaking films, and has been given annually since.

As of 2026, Fiji has submitted only one film, The Land Has Eyes (2004), but it was not nominated.

The country is also the only Pacific Island nation to ever submit a film to the category.

== Submissions ==
The Academy of Motion Picture Arts and Sciences has invited the film industries of various countries to submit their best film for the Academy Award for Best International Feature Film since 1956. The International Feature Film Committee oversees the process and reviews all the submitted films. Following this, they vote via secret ballot to determine the five nominees for the award.

Below is a list of the films that have been submitted by Fiji for review by the Academy for the award by year and the respective Academy Awards ceremony.

Year (Ceremony)	Film title used in nomination	Original title	Language	Director	Result
2005 (78th)	The Land Has Eyes	Pear ta ma 'on maf	Rotuman	Vilsoni Hereniko	Not nominated

== See also ==
- List of Academy Award winners and nominees for Best International Feature Film
- List of Academy Award-winning foreign language films
- Cinema of Fiji
