= List of submissions to the 78th Academy Awards for Best Foreign Language Film =

2005 Best Foreign Language Film submissions
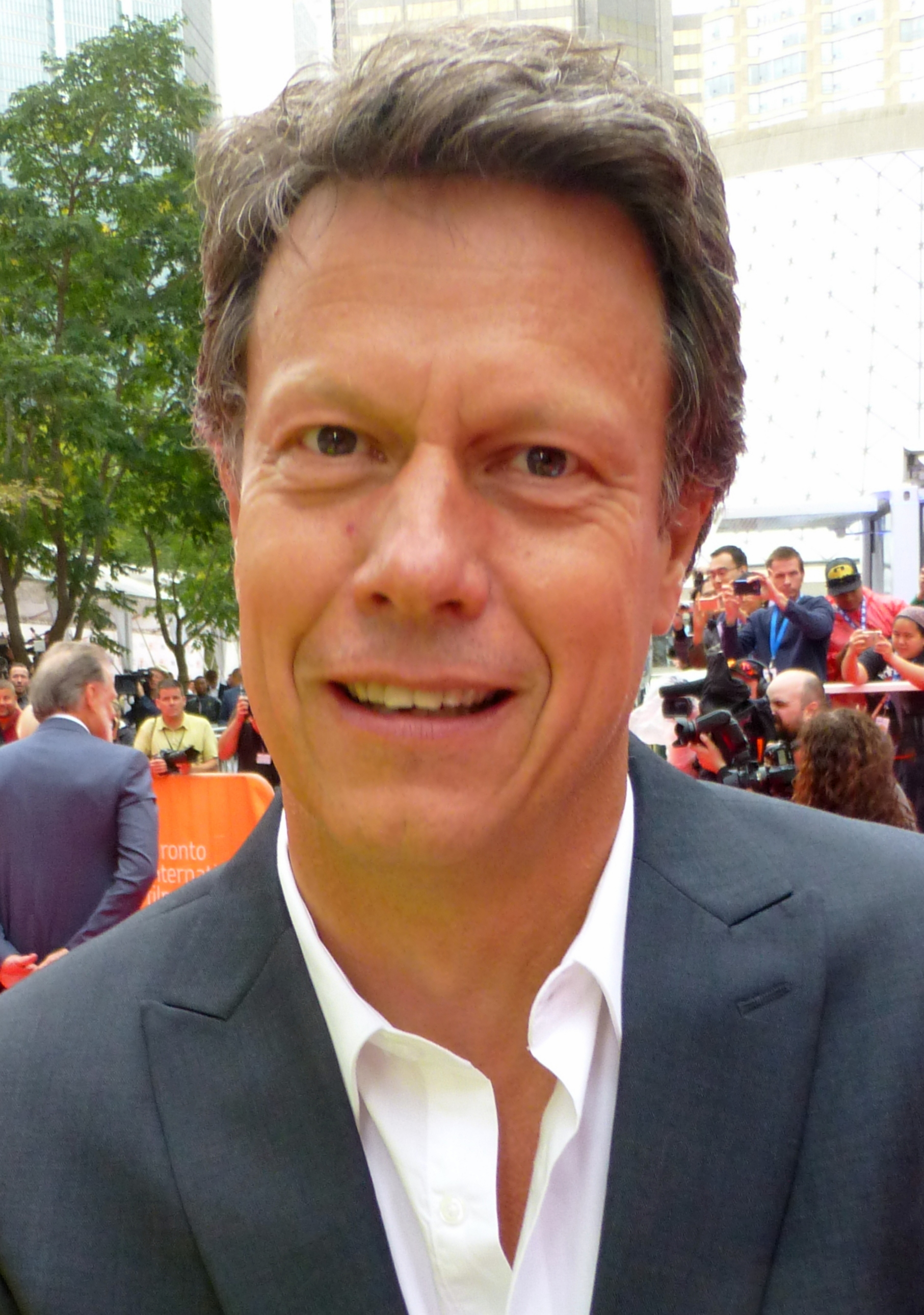
- Gavin Hood directed Tsotsi, which won the year's award.

Highlights
- Oscar winner: (South Africa) Tsotsi
- Submissions: 62
- Debuts: 3
- Total eligible: 58

This is a list of submissions to the 78th Academy Awards for the Best Foreign Language Film. The Academy of Motion Picture Arts and Sciences (AMPAS) has invited the film industries of various countries to submit their best film for the Academy Award for Best Foreign Language Film every year since the award was created in 1956. The award is presented annually by the Academy to a feature-length motion picture produced outside the United States that contains primarily non-English dialogue. The Foreign Language Film Award Committee oversees the process and reviews all the submitted films.

For the 78th Academy Awards, the submitted motion pictures must have first been released theatrically in their respective countries between 1 October 2004 and 30 September 2005. The deadline for submissions to the Academy was 3 October 2005. 62 countries submitted films, and 58 were found to be eligible by AMPAS and screened for voters. Costa Rica, Fiji, and Iraq submitted films for the first time.. Bolivia, the Netherlands, Singapore and Tajikistan were later disqualified by the Academy, leaving 54 eligible entries. The five nominees were announced on 31 January 2006.

South Africa won the award for the first time with Tsotsi by Gavin Hood.

== Submissions ==
Submitting country	Film title used in nomination	Original title	Language(s)	Director(s)	Result
Argentina	The Aura	El aura	Spanish	Fabián Bielinsky	Not nominated
Austria	Caché		French	Michael Haneke	Disqualified
Bangladesh	Shyamol Chhaya	শ্যামল ছায়া	Bengali	Humayun Ahmed	Not nominated
Belgium	The Child	L'enfant	French	Jean-Pierre and Luc Dardenne	Not nominated
Bolivia	Say Good Morning to Dad	Di buen día a papá	Spanish, English, French	Fernando Vargas	Disqualified
Bosnia and Herzegovina	Totally Personal	Sasvim lično	Bosnian, English, Serbian	Nedžad Begović	Not nominated
Brazil	Two Sons of Francisco	Dois Filhos de Francisco	Brazilian Portuguese	Breno Silveira	Not nominated
Bulgaria	Stolen Eyes	Откраднати очи	Bulgarian, Turkish	Radoslav Spassov	Not nominated
Canada	C.R.A.Z.Y.		French, English	Jean-Marc Vallée	Not nominated
Chile	Play		Spanish, Mapudungun	Alicia Scherson	Not nominated
China	The Promise	无极	Mandarin	Chen Kaige	Not nominated
Colombia	Wandering Shadows	La sombra del caminante	Spanish	Ciro Guerra	Not nominated
Costa Rica	Caribe		Spanish, Limonese Creole	Esteban Ramírez	Not nominated
Croatia	A Wonderful Night in Split	Ta divna splitska noć	Croatian, Serbian, English	Arsen Anton Ostojić	Not nominated
Cuba	Viva Cuba		Spanish	Juan Carlos Cremata Malberti	Not nominated
Czech Republic	Something Like Happiness	Štěstí	Czech	Bohdan Sláma	Not nominated
Denmark	Adam's Apples	Adams æbler	Danish, German	Anders Thomas Jensen	Not nominated
Estonia	Shop of Dreams	Stiilipidu	Estonian	Peeter Urbla	Not nominated
Fiji	The Land Has Eyes	Pear ta ma ʻon maf	Rotuman, English	Vilsoni Hereniko	Not nominated
Finland	Mother of Mine	Äideistä parhain / Den bästa av mödrar	Finnish, Swedish, Scanian	Klaus Härö	Not nominated
France	Joyeux Noël		French, German, English	Christian Carion	Nominated
Georgia	Tbilisi-Tbilisi	თბილისი-თბილისი	Georgian	Levan Zakareishvili	Not nominated
Germany	Sophie Scholl – The Final Days	Sophie Scholl – Die letzten Tage	German	Marc Rothemund	Nominated
Greece	Brides	Νύφες	English, Greek, Russian, Turkish, Italian	Pantelis Voulgaris	Disqualified
Hong Kong	Perhaps Love	如果·愛	Cantonese, Mandarin	Peter Chan	Not nominated
Hungary	Fateless	Sorstalanság	Hungarian, German, Yiddish, Hebrew, Polish	Lajos Koltai	Not nominated
Iceland	Ahead of Time	Í takt við tímann	Icelandic	Ágúst Guðmundsson	Not nominated
India	Paheli	पहेली	Hindi, Marwari	Amol Palekar	Not nominated
Indonesia	Gie		Indonesian, English, Mandarin	Riri Riza	Not nominated
Iran	So Close, So Far	خیلی دور، خیلی نزدیک	Persian	Reza Mir Karimi	Not nominated
Iraq	Requiem of Snow	شیوەنی بەفر	Central Kurdish	Jamil Rostami	Not nominated
Israel	What a Wonderful Place	איזה מקום נפלא	Hebrew, Russian, Filipino, English, Thai	Eyal Halfon	Not nominated
Italy	Don't Tell	La bestia nel cuore	Italian, English	Cristina Comencini	Nominated
Japan	Blood and Bones	血と骨	Japanese, Korean	Yoichi Sai	Not nominated
Luxembourg	Renart the Fox	Le Roman de Renart	French	Thierry Schiel	Not nominated
Mexico	To the Other Side	Al otro lado	Spanish, Arabic	Gustavo Loza	Not nominated
Mongolia	The Cave of the Yellow Dog	Шар нохойн там / Die Höhle des gelben Hundes	Mongolian	Byambasuren Davaa	Not nominated
Netherlands	Bluebird		Dutch, English, French	Mijke de Jong	Disqualified
Norway	Kissed by Winter	Vinterkyss	Norwegian, Swedish, English	Sara Johnsen	Not nominated
Palestine	Paradise Now	الجنّة الآن	Arabic, English	Hany Abu Assad	Nominated
Peru	Days of Santiago	Días de Santiago	Spanish	Josué Méndez	Not nominated
Poland	The Collector	Komornik	Polish	Feliks Falk	Not nominated
Portugal	In the Darkness of the Night	Noite Escura	Portuguese, Russian	João Canijo	Not nominated
Puerto Rico	Cayo		Spanish	Vicente Juarbe	Not nominated
Romania	The Death of Mr. Lazarescu	Moartea domnului Lăzărescu	Romanian	Cristi Puiu	Not nominated
Russia	The Italian	Итальянец	Russian, Italian, English	Andrei Kravchuk	Not nominated
Serbia and Montenegro	Midwinter Night's Dream	Сан зимске ноћи	Serbian	Goran Paskaljević	Not nominated
Singapore	Be with Me		English, Singaporean Hokkien, Mandarin, Cantonese	Eric Khoo	Disqualified
Slovakia	The City of the Sun	Slnečný štát / Sluneční stát	Czech, Lach, Slovak	Martin Šulík	Not nominated
Slovenia	Ruins	Ruševine	Slovene	Janez Burger	Not nominated
South Africa	Tsotsi		Tsotsitaal, Setswana, Zulu, Sotho, Xhosa, Afrikaans, English	Gavin Hood	Won Academy Award
South Korea	Welcome to Dongmakgol	웰컴 투 동막골	Gangwon Korean	Park Kwang-hyun	Not nominated
Spain	Obaba		Spanish, Basque, German	Montxo Armendáriz	Not nominated
Sweden	Zozo		Arabic, Swedish	Josef Fares	Not nominated
Switzerland	One Long Winter Without Fire	Tout un hiver sans feu	French, Albanian	Greg Zglinski	Not nominated
Taiwan	The Wayward Cloud	天邊一朵雲	Mandarin, Japanese	Tsai Ming-liang	Not nominated
Tajikistan	Sex & Philosophy	Ҷинс ва фалсафа / سکس و فلسفه	Russian, Tajik	Mohsen Makhmalbaf	Disqualified
Thailand	The Tin Mine	มหา'ลัย เหมืองแร่	Thai, English, Malay	Jira Maligool	Not nominated
Turkey	Lovelorn	Gönül Yarası	Turkish, Northern Kurdish	Yavuz Turgul	Not nominated
Uruguay	Alma mater		Spanish	Álvaro Buela	Not on the final list
Venezuela	1888: The Extraordinary Voyage of the Santa Isabel	1888: El extraordinario viaje de la Santa Isabel	Spanish	Alfredo Anzola	Disqualified
Vietnam	The Buffalo Boy	Mùa len trâu	Vietnamese	Nguyễn Võ Nghiêm Minh	Not nominated

== Notes ==
- Austria submitted Caché by Michael Haneke, but it was disqualified because the film was completely in French and not in a language indigenous to Austria, even after it submitted a German-dubbed print of the film. However, the Academy changed the rules removing the requirement that the films be in an official language of the submitting country.
- Bolivia submitted Say Good Morning to Dad by Fernando Vargas, but it was disqualified because a 35-mm print of the film did not arrive at the Academy in time.
- Greece submitted Brides by Pantelis Voulgaris, but it was disqualified after its official screening for being mostly in English and not in a foreign fanguage.
- Italy originally submitted Private by Saverio Costanzo, but it was disqualified because the film was completely in Arabic and Hebrew, and not in a language indigenous to Italy. The Italian Academy appealed the decision, but the committee submitted a second film, Don't Tell by Cristina Comencini.
- Nepal initially selected Basain by Subash Gajurel, but due to its release date, it was submitted the following year instead.
- The Netherlands submitted Bluebird by Mijke de Jong, but it was disqualified because it was too similar to a version previously aired on Dutch television; it was too late to select another Dutch film.
- Palestine submitted Paradise Now by Hany Abu-Assad, and it was referred to as such at the Golden Globes. However, Israeli officials, including Consul General Ehud Danoch and Consul for Media and Public Affairs Gilad Millo, tried to extract a guarantee from the Academy of Motion Picture Arts and Sciences that Paradise Now would not be presented in the ceremony as representing the State of Palestine, despite the fact it was introduced as such in the Academy Awards' official website. The Academy Awards began to refer to the film's country instead as "the Palestinian Authority", a decision that angered Abu-Assad, who said it represented a slap in the face for the Palestinian people and their national identity. The academy subsequently referred to it as a submission from the "Palestinian Territories".
- The Philippines failed to send a film for the first time in ten years after their Film Academy claimed they thought they hadn't been invited after the official invitation failed to reach their new address.
- Singapore submitted Be with Me by Eric Khoo, but it was disqualified after its official screening for being mostly in English and not in a foreign language.
- Tajikistan submitted Sex & Philosophy by Mohsen Makhmalbaf, but it was disqualified because a 35-mm print of the film did not arrive at the Academy in time.
- Uruguay reportedly submitted Alma mater by Álvaro Buela, but it did not appear on the final list of films sent to Academy voters.
- Venezuela submitted 1888: The Extraordinary Voyage of the Santa Isabel by Alfredo Anzola, but their entry was delayed by two lawsuits: one against rival film Secuestro express by Jonathan Jakubowicz, that called for pulling it from circulation to delete a specific scene culled from news footage during a public rebellion against the Chavez regime, and a second lawsuit targetting Jakubowicz of fomenting illegal drug use and vilifying the nation's armed forces and its president. Secuestro express was eventually rejected as its entry. This led the Venezuelan Film Board to miss the deadline when the required entry forms didn’t arrive at AMPAS offices in time.
