= Dogaru =

Dogaru, meaning "cooper", is a Romanian surname. Notable people with the surname include:

- Anastasia and Tatiana Dogaru
- Dana Dogaru, Romanian actress
- Vlad Dogaru, Romanian basketball player
