= Hereniko =

Hereniko is a surname. Notable people with the surname include:

- Jeannette Paulson Hereniko (born 1940), American film producer, television writer, and film festival founder
- Vilsoni Hereniko (born 1954), Fijian playwright, film director, and academic
