= Emelihter Kihleng =

Micronesian poet

Emelihter S. Kihleng
- Born: Guam
- Education: University Hawaiʻi at Mānoa, B.A., M.A., Victoria University of Wellington, PhD
- Occupations: Poet, academic
- Writing career
- Language: Pohnpeian, English
- Genres: Postcolonialism, poetry, ethnography
- Notable work: My Urohs

Emelihter Kihleng is a Micronesian (and more specifically Pohnpeian) poet. She is the first ever Micronesian to publish a collection of poetry in the English language, and is one of few published Micronesian poets.

== Biography ==
Born in Guam, she obtained a master's degree in creative writing at the University of Hawaiʻi at Mānoa in 2003, and subsequently taught English as a second language at the College of Micronesia in Pohnpei. She later received a PhD in Pacific studies from the Victoria University of Wellington in 2015. Her PhD Thesis was titled "Menginpehn Lien Pohnpei: a poetic ethnography of urohs (Pohnpeian skirts)", and was supervised by Teresia Teaiwa and Brian Diettrich.

In May 2008, she published her first collection of poems, My Urohs. Samoan writer Albert Wendt described her poetry as "refreshingly innovative and compelling, a new way of seeing ourselves in our islands, an important and influential addition to our literature" – meaning Pacific Islander literature. I-Kiribati poet Teresia Teaiwa described it as "ethnographic poetry", "lush with the languages and imagery of Pohnpei and Micronesia", "an exciting new contribution to Pacific literature". Samoan writer Sia Figiel described her poetry as "disturbing and haunting, illuminating and tender", "woven from the violent threads of postcolonialism, laced with patches of Island humour", "a powerful addition to Pacific Literature". American poet Mark Nowak also praised her work.

Kihleng explained that the urohs is "the quintessential dress of a Pohnpeian woman as a symbol of Pohnpeian women and Pohnpeian culture. I chose to title the collection My Urohs [...] because [...] the essence of the collection as a whole [is] colorful, tragic, beautiful, colonized and indigenous all at the same time".

In February 2009, Kihleng and University of Guam professor of English Dr. Evelyn Flores announced their intention to publish the first ever anthology of Micronesian literature, calling for contributions from writers from Guam, Palau, the Northern Mariana Islands, Nauru, Kiribati, the Marshall Islands, and the Federated States of Micronesia. Kihleng noted that, while Polynesia and Melanesia had made a notable impact on Pacific literature, Micronesia still appeared to be "invisible".

According to the University of Hawaiʻi at Mānoa, "[m]uch of her work is about Pohnpeian identity and diaspora". The Office of Insular Affairs, a branch of the United States government's Department of the Interior, describes her as "one of the most gifted young writers in the Pacific".

As of 2008, Kihleng was working in Guam, and, according to the United States government, "working at the University of Guam's Violence Against Women Prevention Program".

In 2023, Kihleng was appointed Curator Pacific Cultures at the Museum of New Zealand Te Papa Tongarewa.

== Published works ==
- My Urohs (poetry collection), Kahuaomanoa, 2008, ISBN 978-0-9793788-3-6

=== Edited ===
- with Evelyn Flores: Indigenous Literatures from Micronesia, University of Hawai'i Press, 2019, ISBN 978-0-8248-7541-1
