= Stupini =

Stupini may refer to several villages in Romania:

- Stupini, a village in Sânmihaiu de Câmpie Commune, Bistrița-Năsăud County
- Stupini, a village in Hida Commune, Sălaj County
- Stupinii Prejmerului, a village in Prejmer Commune, Brașov County
