= BBC Four World Cinema Awards =

BBC Four World Cinema Award
- Awarded for: Best in foreign language film
- Sponsored by: Pioneer
- Venue: BFI Southbank, London
- Country: United Kingdom
- Presented by: BBC Scotland
- First award: 2004
- Final award: 2011
- Currently held by: Nader and Simin: A Separation
- Website: BBC Four World Cinema Awards

Television/radio coverage
- Network: BBC Four

The BBC Four World Cinema Award is an annual prize given out to celebrate the best in world cinema. A shortlist of up to six films is made by the UK's leading critics, film-school heads and festival directors from the foreign language films released in that year in the UK. The winner is selected by a panel of judges whose decision making process is screened as part of the award ceremony, screened live on BBC Four, and since the beginning hosted by Jonathan Ross.

== History ==
2008 was its seventh year, with the BBC Four World Cinema Award ceremony hosted by Jonathan Ross from the BFI Southbank in London. The winner of the 2008 award was announced on 30 January 2008, and the event was broadcast on BBC Four on 2 February 2008.

In 2009, a new Achievement award for an international film-maker of great distinction was added to the ceremony in addition to the existing best film award., which was awarded was given to Werner Herzog. The 2009 award ceremony took place on 27 January 2009, again at the BFI Southbank.

The seventh annual ceremony took place in October 2010.

As the BBC needed to make budgetary cut backs, 2011 was the last BBC Four World Cinema Awards was held.

== Award winners ==
=== BBC Four World Cinema Award ===
| Year | Winning film | Director | Country |
|---|---|---|---|
| 2011 | Nader and Simin: A Separation (Jodái-e Náder az Simin) | Asghar Farhadi | Iran |
| 2011 | Nominees: The Skin I Live In (La piel que habito), Pedro Almodóvar, Spain; Uncle Boonmee Who Can Recall His Past Lives (Lung Bunmi Raluek Chat), Apichatpong Weerasethakul, Thailand; Of Gods and Men (Des hommes et des dieux), Xavier Beauvois, France; Le Quattro Volte (Le Quattro Volte), Michelangelo Frammartino, Italy | | |
| 2010 | The White Ribbon (Das weiße Band, Eine deutsche Kindergeschichte) | Michael Haneke | Austria |
| 2010 | Nominees: I Am Love (Io sono l'amore), Luca Guadagnino, Italy; Let the Right One In (Låt den rätte komma in), Tomas Alfredson, Sweden; A Prophet (Un prophète), Jacques Audiard, France; Waltz with Bashir (Vals Im Bashir), Ari Folman, Israel | | |
| 2009 | 4 Months, 3 Weeks and 2 Days (4 luni, 3 săptămâni şi 2 zile) | Cristian Mungiu | Romania |
| 2009 | Nominees: Gomorrah (Gomorra), Matteo Garrone, Italy; Persepolis, Vincent Paronnaud and Marjane Satrapi, France; The Diving Bell and the Butterfly, Julian Schnabel, France/USA; The Orphanage (El Orfanato), Juan Antonio Bayona, Spain/Mexico | | |
| 2008 | Pan's Labyrinth (El Laberinto del Fauno) | Guillermo del Toro | Mexico/Spain/USA |
| 2008 | Nominees: The Lives of Others (Das Leben Der Anderen), Florian Henckel von Donnersmarck, Germany; The Science of Sleep (La Science Des Rêves), Michel Gondry, France/Italy/USA; Climates (Iklimler), Nuri Bilge Ceylan, Turkey/France; Syndromes and a Century (Sang Sattawat), Apichatpong Weerasethakul, Thailand/France/Austria | | |
| 2007 | The Death of Mr. Lazarescu (Moartea Domnului Lazarescu) | Cristi Puiu | Romania |
| 2007 | Nominees: The Beat That My Heart Skipped (De Battre Mon Coeur S'est Arrêté), Jacques Audiard, France; The Child (L'Enfant), Jean-Pierre & Luc Dardenne, Belgium/France; Hidden (Caché), Michael Haneke, France/Germany/Austria/Italy; Lady Vengeance (Chinjeolhan Geumjassi), Chan-Wook Park, South Korea; Volver, Pedro Almodóvar, Spain | | |
| 2006 | Downfall (Der Untergang) | Oliver Hirschbiegel | Germany/Italy/Austria |
| 2006 | Nominees: 2046, Wong Kar-Wai, China/France/Germany/Hong Kong; House of Flying Daggers, Zhang Yimou, China/Hong Kong; Look at Me, Agnès Jaoui, France/Italy; The Sea Inside, Alejandro Amenábar, Spain; Tropical Malady, Apichatpong Weerasethakul, Thailand | | |
| 2005 | The Return (Vozvrashcheniye) | Andrey Zvyagintsev | Russia |
| 2005 | Nominees: Bad Education, Pedro Almodóvar, Spain; Hero, Zhang Yimou, China/Hong Kong; The Motorcycle Diaries, Walter Salles, USA/UK/Argentina/Chile/Peru; Uzak, Nuri Bilge Ceylan, Turkey; Zatōichi, Takeshi Kitano, Japan | | |
| 2004 | Belleville Rendez-vous (Les Triplettes de Belleville) | Sylvain Chomet | France/Belgium/Canada |
| 2004 | Nominees: City of God (Cidade de Deus), Fernando Meirelles and co-director Katia Lund, Brazil/France/USA; Être et Avoir, Nicolas Philibert, France; Good Bye, Lenin!, Wolfgang Becker, Germany; The Man Without a Past (Mies vailla menneisyyttä), Aki Kaurismaki, Finland/Germany/France; Spirited Away (Sen to Chihiro no Kamikakushi), Hayao Miyazaki, USA/Japan | | |

=== BBC Four World Cinema Achievement Award ===
- 2009 – Werner Herzog
- 2010 – Bernardo Bertolucci
- 2011 – Isabelle Huppert
