= John Fatiaki =

Medical practitioner (born 1947 or 1948)

Dr John Charles Fatiaki (born 1947 or 1948) is a career medical practitioner who was chosen by the Rotuma Island Council to be their representative in the Fijian Senate. He is the younger brother of former Chief Justice of Fiji Daniel Fatiaki.

== Education and early career ==
For the first six years of his life John Fatiaki was raised in Rotuma by his grandparents (in the style of traditional Rotuman adoption practices), where his maternal grandfather's family (Benjamin Morris clan) owned the one and only movie theater on the island. At the age of six, John moved to Suva to live with his biological parents, and it is here that he learned English. His father, a renowned Rotuman author and educator, Aselemo Fatiaki, assigned each of his six sons an occupation to achieve at the age of twelve. Dr Fatiaki attended high school in Suva and Lautoka before moving to Tasmania, Australia to study medicine at the University of Tasmania. Upon return he operated a medical practice in Suva, as well as spending time working on the island of Rotuma, at the small local hospital. In addition to this he cooperated with the local court and interpreted the proceedings into English for the presiding district officer.

In 2015 he submitted an entry to a competition to decide a new Fijian flag.

== Political career ==
In 2006, he was selected by the Council of Rotuma to represent the 2000-odd inhabitants of the Polynesian dependency of Fiji in the Senate of Fiji. Since his selection he has been active in lobbying, together with George Konrote for the removal of the Bulou ni Ceva, a Fijian sea vessel that was stranded on the reef in Rotuma, putting the local environment at risk. In addition, he has been pushing for improvements to the Rotuman airstrip which is in a serious state of disrepair. He lost his seat in the 2006 Fijian coup d'état.

He contested the 2022 Fijian general election as a candidate for the National Federation Party, winning 1800 votes.

== The Land has Eyes ==
Dr Fatiaki also played a role in the award-winning Rotuman language film Pear ta ma 'on mafa (The Land has Eyes), which was directed by Vilsoni Hereniko. The film made its world premiere at the Sundance Film Festival in 2004. Dr Fatiaki played the role of Poto, a corrupt court interpreter.
