= Raun Raun Theatre =

Theater in Goroka, Eastern Highlands, Papua New Guinea

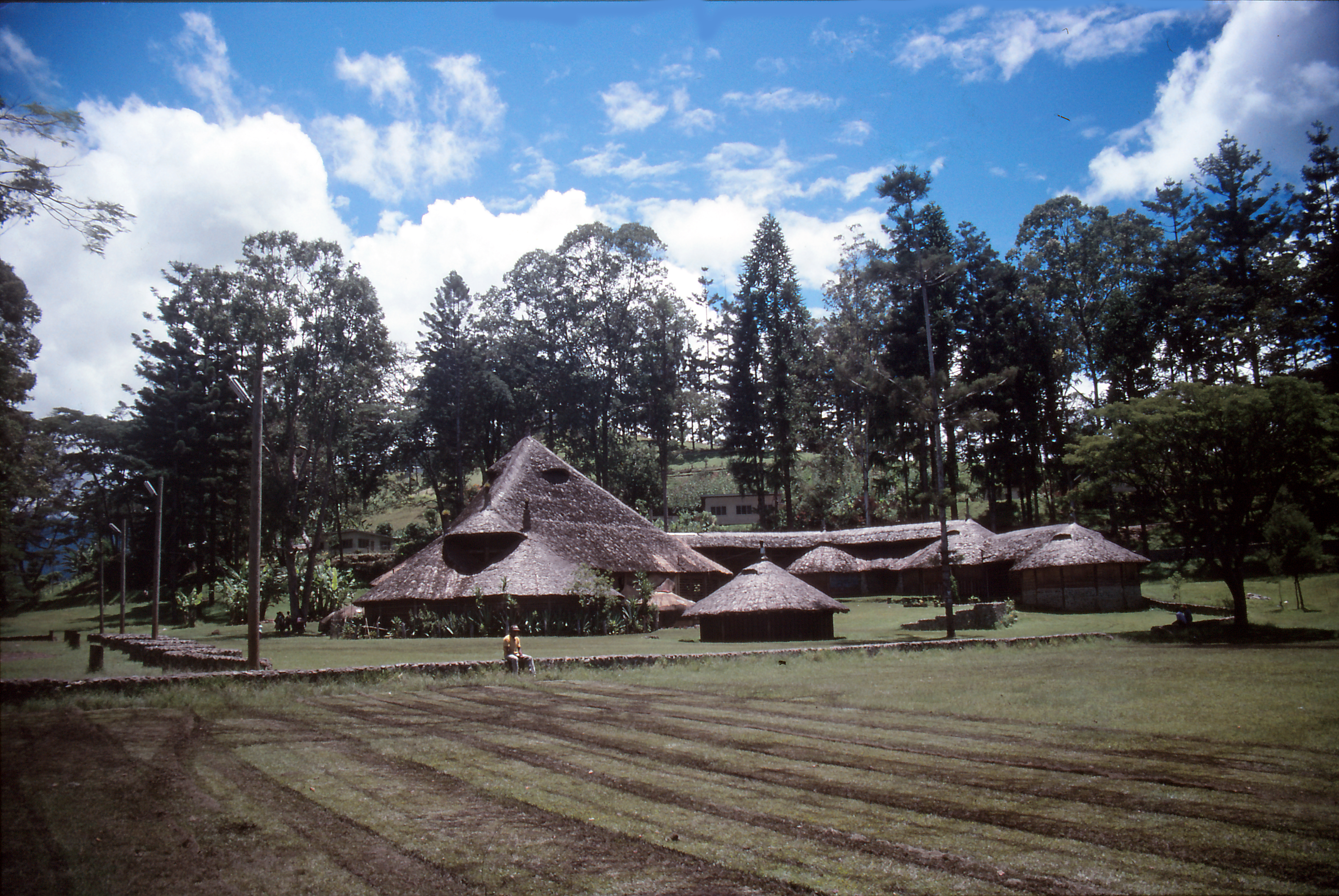

- Location within Papua New Guinea
- Location: Goroka, Eastern Highlands, Papua New Guinea
- Coordinates: 6°4′12.4″S 145°23′29.8″E
- Operator: John Doa (Director)
- Type: movie theater

Construction
- Groundbreaking: 1980
- Built: 1981
- Opened: 1982
- Renovated: 2010s

The Raun Raun Theatre is a movie theater in Goroka, Eastern Highlands, Papua New Guinea.

== History ==
The theatre was originally constructed in 1980 and completed in 1981. It was then officially opened in 1982. However, since 2017 the theatre had not shown any movie due to the rotting condition of the building. In July 2019, the Tourism Promotion Authority through the Ministry of Tourism Arts and Culture made a statement to renovate the theatre. In late 2010s, it underwent renovation and was reopened again on 16 October 2019 in a ceremony attended by acting Executive Director of National Cultural Commission Steven Kilanda and First Secretary of Department of Tourism, Arts and Culture Andrew Yamai. On 8 October 2020, heavy rain and wind brought down two trees which damaged the fencing sections of the theatre.

== Architecture ==
The theatre was constructed with traditional material and modern architecture. Its roof was constructed from savanna.

== Activities ==
The theatre shows both traditional and contemporary movies as well as singing and dancing. It is also the home for Raun Raun Theatre performing group which was formed in April 1975.

== See also ==
- List of Oceanian films
