= Esther Tumama Cowley-Malcolm =

Samoan-New Zealand health researcher and practitioner

- Education: Victoria University of Wellington
- Awards: Loxley Award 2015
- Scientific career
- Thesis: Perceptions of Samoan Parents from a Small Town in New Zealand on Parenting, Childhood Aggression, and the CD-ROM 'Play Nicely' (2013)
- Doctoral advisor: Peggy Fairbairn-Dunlop, Stephanie Doyle

Esther Tumama Cowley-Malcolm MNZM is a Samoan–New Zealand health researcher and practitioner. She was the first doctoral student of the Pacific studies programme at the Victoria University of Wellington. Cowley-Malcolm has held a number of offices, including as a board member of the Health Research Council of New Zealand, and a director of Te Whare Wānanga o Awanuiārangi. In 2015 she was awarded the Loxley Award by Quaker Peace and Service Aotearoa New Zealand, and in 2005 she was appointed a member of the New Zealand Order of Merit, for services to Pacific Island families.

== Career ==
Cowley-Malcolm is a Quaker. Her parents immigrated to New Zealand in 1950s, settling in Tokoroa. She worked initially as a nurse, and then as a teacher and in prison education. She then worked as a researcher, and became involved in a longitudinal study on Pacific health.

Cowley-Malcolm completed a Masters degree at Auckland University of Technology in 2005. Her masters thesis was titled Some Samoans' perceptions, values and beliefs on the role of parents and children within the context of aiga/family and the influence of fa'asamoa and the church on Samoan parenting. She did her PhD in Pacific Cultural Studies at the Victoria University of Wellington, she was the first women graduate of the Pacific studies programme. Her doctoral thesis, which she completed at the age of sixty, was titled Perceptions of Samoan Parents from a Small Town in New Zealand on Parenting, Childhood Aggression, and the CD-ROM 'Play Nicely' .

== Offices ==
- Board member of the Health Research Council of New Zealand
- Chair of the Health Research Council of New Zealand Pacific Research Advisory Committee
- Director at Te Whare Wānanga o Awanuiārangi
- Member of the Parenting Council of New Zealand
- Member of the New Zealand Medical Laboratory Science Board
- Chairperson of Pacific Development and conservation Trust (formerly the Rainbow Warrior Trust)
- National secretary of PACIFICA Inco
- Member of the Quaker Education Trust
- Inaugural Chair of Newmarket School Board of Trustees
- Member of The Wesley College Board of Trustees
- Member secretary of Allen Nixon Trust
- Member of Consultative Committee on Community Relations (Brisbane, Australia).

== Awards ==
- Loxley Award 2015, Quaker Peace and Service Aotearoa New Zealand
- HRC PhD Pacific scholarship
- Member of NZ Order of Merit (MNZM) 2005, for services to Pacific Island families
