= Ron Crocombe =

Cook Islands academic (1929–2009)

Ronald Gordon (Ron) Crocombe (8 October 1929 – 19 June 2009) was a Professor of Pacific Studies at the University of the South Pacific. His reputation was such that he was described as the "father of Pacific Studies".

== Biography ==
Crocombe was born in Auckland, New Zealand, and was raised in Piopio in the King Country, before attending Otahuhu College in Auckland. He later completed a degree from Auckland University. In 1950 he went to Rarotonga in the Cook Islands as Clerk of Works for the New Zealand colonial Government's Public Works Department. In 1957 he became the Resident Agent "Akavanui" or head of local government on the island of Atiu. There he formed a lifelong association with the people of Atiu including the high chief Rongomatane who named one of his sons in honour of their friendship.

He started university studies by extension in Rarotonga and went on to complete a bachelor's degree from Auckland University, then completed an MA from Victoria University of Wellington, and a PhD in history at the Australian National University (ANU) in 1961. His work on land use and tenure in Cook Island society was considered groundbreaking at the time and is still used as a standard text in South Pacific land tenure studies.

Crocombe lived in Papua New Guinea between 1962 and 1969, as Director of the ANU's New Guinea Research Unit based in Port Moresby, and then went to the newly established University of the South Pacific where he was Professor of Pacific Studies for 20 years. He was made Emeritus Professor in 1989.

During his tenure as the Director of the Institute of Pacific Studies at the University of the South Pacific, Crocombe prioritized publishing the works of Pacific Islanders by actively promoting and supporting their efforts. He pioneered a strategy of compiling books on significant subjects with contributions from up to twenty different authors, aimed at fostering the burgeoning confidence and scholarly output of Pacific Island authors. The Institute of Pacific Studies published the works of over 1,700 Pacific Island authors during this period.

In the week before his death he had been inducted as a fellow of the Atenisi University in Tonga. His reputation was such that he was described as the "father of Pacific Studies". He mentored many students and academics, and was warmly regarded.

=== Death ===
He died in Auckland of a heart attack on 19 June 2009 while returning to his home in Rarotonga. His wife and lifetime academic collaborator was Marjorie Tuainekore Crocombe, who had been Director of Extension Services at the University of the South Pacific and lately Director of the Centre for Pacific Studies at the University of Auckland. Crocombe was also survived by four children, 14 grandchildren and eight great-grandchildren. The Cook Islands Parliament was adjourned for his funeral in Rarotonga.

=== Posthumous honours ===
In August 2010, a Festschrift conference was held at the University of the South Pacific in Rarotonga to commemorate Crocombe's lifetime work. Speakers included family and colleagues of Crocombe, including the poet Albert Wendt.

On 13 February 2014, a book was launched as a tribute to Crocombe's life, work and academic impact. It contains contributions from academics he worked with, taught, and influenced. The book was edited by his wife, Marjorie Crocombe, and colleagues Rod Dixon and Linda Crowl.

== Books ==
- Crocombe R.G. 1958. The Cook Islands. Wellington: Government Printer.
- Crocombe R.G., M.T. Crocombe (eds.). 1968. The Works of Ta'unga: Records of a Polynesian Traveller in the Southern Seas, 1833–1896. Canberra: Australian National University Press; Honolulu: University of Hawaii Press.
- Crocombe R.G. 1968. Improving land tenure: a survey of the problems of adapting customary land tenure systems to modern economic conditions in the region served by the South Pacific Commission. Nouméa: South Pacific Commission.
- Crocombe R.G. 1971. Land tenure in the Pacific. Oxford: Oxford University Press. ISBN 0-19-550316-3.
- Crocombe R.G., A. Ali (eds.). 1983. Foreign forces in Pacific politics. Suva: University of the South Pacific.
- Patel K., R.G. Crocombe, P. Hereniko (eds.). 1985. Tahiti: The Other Side. Suva: University of the South Pacific.
- Crocombe R.G. (ed.) 1988. Pacific universities: achievements, problems, prospects. Suva: University of the South Pacific.
- Bartlett A., P. Larmour, R.G. Crocombe. 1981. Land, People and Government: Public Lands Policy in the South Pacific. Suva: University of South Pacific.
- Acquaye B., R.G. Crocombe (eds.). 1984. Land tenure and rural productivity in the Pacific Islands. Suva: University of the South Pacific.
- Pollock N.J., R.G. Crocombe (eds.). 1988. French Polynesia: a book of selected readings. Suva: University of the South Pacific. ISBN 982-02-0032-6.
- Crocombe R.G. 1990. Voluntary service and development in the Cook Islands. Rarotonga: University of the South Pacific. ISBN 982-02-0023-7.
- Crocombe M.T., R.G Crocombe, K. Kauraka, M. Tongia (eds.). 1992. Te rau maire: poems and stories of the Pacific. Rarotonga: Tauranga Vananga. ISBN 982-220-005-6.
- Crocombe R.G. and E. Tuza. 1992. Independence, dependence, interdependence: the first 10 years of Solomon Islands independence. Honiara: University of the South Pacific Honiara Centre. ISBN 982-02-0194-2.
- Crocombe R.G. 1992. Pacific Neighbours: New Zealand's Relations With Other Pacific Islands. Christchurch: University of Canterbury; Suva: University of the South Pacific. ISBN 982-02-0078-4.
- Crocombe R.G., M.T. Crocombe. 1994. Post secondary education in the South Pacific: present patterns and future options. London: Commonwealth Secretariat. ISBN 0-85092-399-9.
- Crocombe R.G. 1995. The Pacific Islands and the USA. Rarotonga: University of the South Pacific; Honolulu: East-West Center. ISBN 982-02-0116-0.
- Crocombe R.G., M.T. Crocombe (eds.). 2002. Akono'anga Maori: Cook Islands culture. Suva: University of the South Pacific. ISBN 982-02-0348-1.
- Nedeljkovic M., R.G. Crocombe. 2003. Terre et territoires: défis et évolutions dans les pays du Pacifique. Paris: Harmattan. ISBN 2-7475-4422-2.
- Crocombe R.G. 2007. Asia in the Pacific Islands: Replacing the West. Suva: University of the South Pacific. ISBN 982-02-0388-0.
- Crocombe R.G. 2008. The South Pacific. 7th edition. Suva: University of the South Pacific. ISBN 982-02-0154-3.
