= Sieranevada =

- Theatrical release poster
- Directed by: Cristi Puiu
- Written by: Cristi Puiu
- Produced by: Anca Puiu
- Starring: Mimi Brănescu; Dana Dogaru; Sorin Medeleni; Ana Ciontea; Bogdan Dumitrache
- Cinematography: Barbu Bălășoiu
- Edited by: Letiția Ștefănescu; Ciprian Cimpoi; Iulia Mureșan
- Music by: Bojan Gagić
- Production companies: Mandragora; Produkcija 2006 Sarajevo; Studioul de Creație Cinematografică; Sisters and Brother Mitevski; Spiritus Movens; Alcatraz Films; Iadasarecasa; Arte France Cinéma
- Release date: 12 May 2016 (Cannes)
- Running time: 173 minutes
- Countries: Romania; Bosnia and Herzegovina; Croatia; North Macedonia; France
- Language: Romanian
- Budget: €1.4 million
- Box office: $243,033

Sieranevada is a 2016 Romanian black comedy-drama film written and directed by Cristi Puiu and starring Mimi Brănescu. The plot follows a successful neurologist who attends a family meal supposed to commemorate his deceased father. It was selected to compete for the Palme d'Or at the 2016 Cannes Film Festival. It was selected as the Romanian entry for the Best Foreign Language Film at the 89th Academy Awards, but it was not nominated.

== Cast ==
- Mimi Brănescu – Lary
- Judith State – Sandra
- Bogdan Dumitrache – Relu
- Dana Dogaru – Nușa
- Sorin Medeleni – Toni
- Ana Ciontea – Ofelia
- Rolando Matsangos – Gabi

== Production ==
The film was produced through Mandragora SRL in collaboration with Studioul de Creație Cinematografică Romania, Bosnia and Herzegovina's 2006 d.o.o., Croatia's Spiritus Movens, Macedonia's Sisters and Brother Mitevski Production and France's Alcatraz Films. It received 1,639,000 RON (equivalent to about 360,000 EUR exchange rate in early 2015 - when filming took place) in support from the Romanian National Film Centre, 200,000 Euro from Eurimages, 91,500 EUR from the Croatian Audiovisual Centre and 84,000 EUR from the Macedonian Film Fund.

Filming took place in Bucharest from January to March 2015.

== Reception ==
=== Critical reception ===
On review aggregator website Rotten Tomatoes, the film holds an approval rating of 92% based on 49 reviews, and an average rating of 7.5/10. The website's critical consensus reads, "Sieranevada targets a narrow viewing demographic, but hits its targets with intelligence, humor, and patient craft." On Metacritic, the film has a weighted average score of 82 out of 100, based on 10 critics, indicating "universal acclaim".

=== Awards ===
At the 2017 Gopo Awards, Sieranevada won the following:

- Best Film
- Best Director (Puiu)
- Best Screenplay (Puiu)
- Best Lead Actress (Dogaru)
- Best Supporting Actress (Ciontea)
- Best Editing (Letiția Ștefănescu, Ciprian Cimpoi)

== See also ==
- List of submissions to the 89th Academy Awards for Best Foreign Language Film
- List of Romanian submissions for the Academy Award for Best Foreign Language Film
