= Ake Lianga =

Solomon Islands screen printer and painter

- Born: 1975 (age 50–51); Guadalcanal, Solomon Islands
- Education: North Island College, Canada
- Awards: Commonwealth Arts and Crafts award for painting, 1996

Ake Lianga (born 1975 on Guadalcanal) is a Solomon Islands screen printer and painter, who has "gained recognition for paintings and murals throughout Oceania".

After schooling, Lianga became self-employed as a sign painter and mural artist. In 1995, he won the South Pacific Contemporary Art Competition.

In 1996, he won the Commonwealth Arts and Crafts award for painting, and began studying at North Island College in Canada. He graduated in Fine Arts in 1999. During his final semester, he was hired by the College to teach printmaking to first year students. He married in 2001 and, as of 2007, lives in Canada.

His work was exhibited at the Comox Valley Art Gallery in 1998, at the Alcheringa Gallery in 2001, and at the Washington State University's Department of Fine Arts in 2007. Lianga's art has also been featured on the cover of the autumn 2004 edition of The Contemporary Pacific. In 2010, Alcheringa Gallery set up "Pacific Connections, a cross-cultural collaboration featuring Ake Lianga [...] and John Marston, a Coast Salish carver from the Chemainus First Nation".

Carol Ivory, chair of the Department of Fine Arts at Washington State University, has described Lianga's work as follows:

Lianga looks both backwards and forwards, bringing mythology, history and the contemporary world together in riveting works of art. [...] Lianga's artwork often engages with significant issues arising from post-colonial situations, creating works that can be described as both visually appealing and emotionally powerful.

Lianga was a guest speaker at Washington State University in 2007.
