= Ioan Fiscuteanu =

Romanian actor (1937–2007)

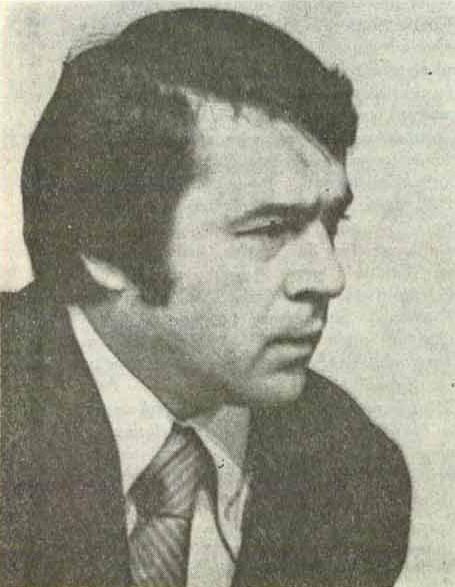
- Ion Fiscuteanu, Teatrul magazine, 1977
- Born: November 19, 1937; Sânmihaiu de Câmpie, Bistrița-Năsăud County, Kingdom of Romania
- Died: 8 December 2007 (aged 70); Târgu Mureș, Romania
- Resting place: Central Cemetery, Târgu Mureș
- Education: I.L. Caragiale Institute of Theatre and Film Arts
- Occupation: Actor
- Employer: National Theater Târgu Mureș
- Awards: National Order of Faithful Service, Knight rank

Ioan Fiscuteanu (Romanian pronunciation: [iˈo̯an fiskuˈte̯anu]; 19 November 1937 – 8 December 2007) was a Romanian theater and film actor. He last worked at the National Theater in Târgu Mureș.

Fiscuteanu was born in Sânmihaiu de Câmpie, Bistrița-Năsăud County. He graduated from the I.L. Caragiale Institute of Theatre and Film Arts in Bucharest in 1962.

The role of Dante Remus Lăzărescu in the 2005 film The Death of Mr. Lazarescu brought Fiscuteanu critical acclaim, as well as the Golden Swan award for best actor at the Copenhagen International Film Festival. He also played supporting roles in notable Romanian films such as Nae Caranfil's Asphalt Tango (1993), Șerban Marinescu's The Earth's Most Beloved Son (1993), and Lucian Pintilie's The Oak (1992).

Fiscutaneu died in Târgu Mureș, aged 70, from colorectal cancer. He was buried in the city's Central Cemetery.

In 2011 he was posthumously awarded the National Order of Faithful Service, Knight rank.
