= List of Oceanian films =

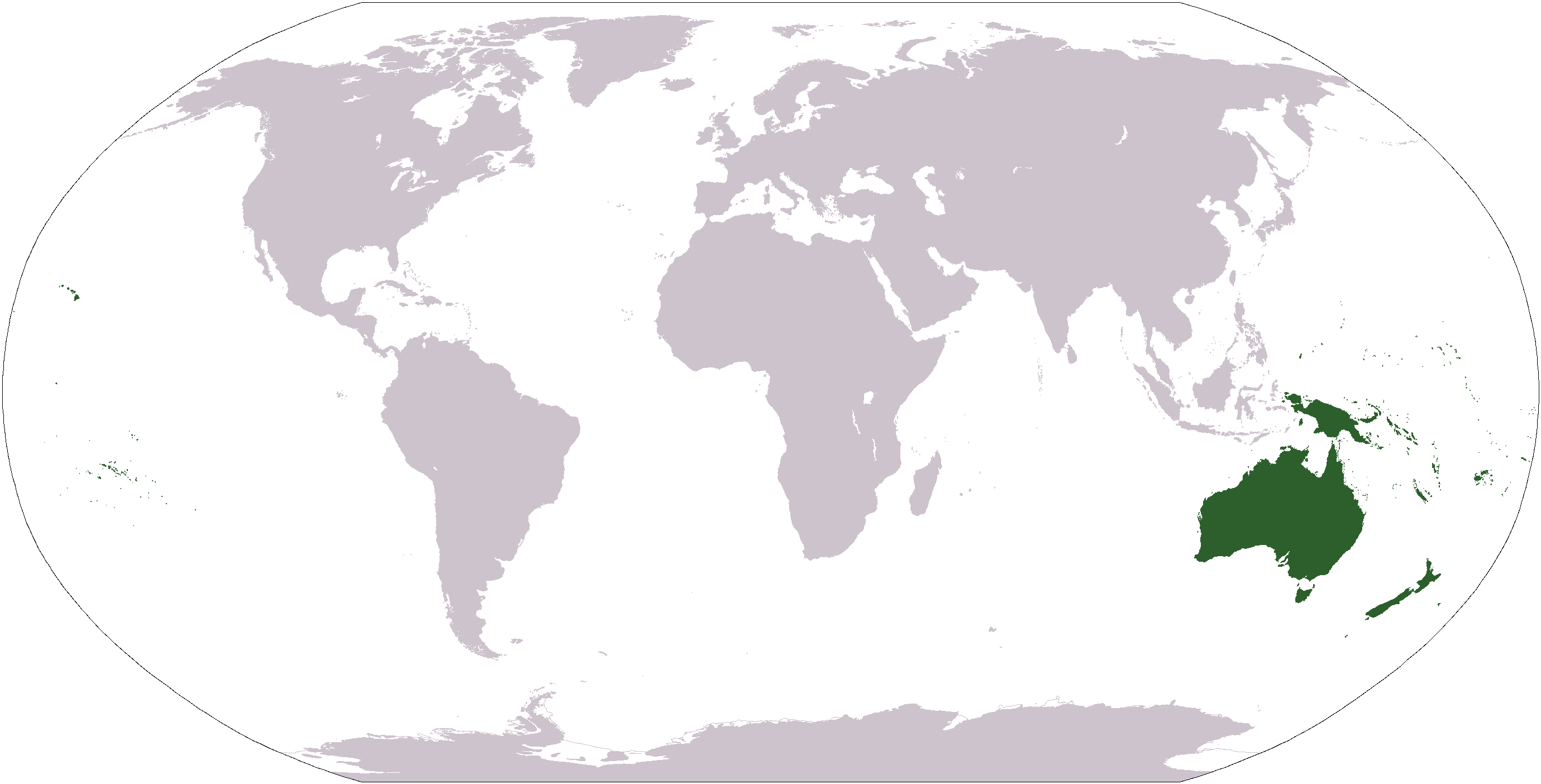

This is a list of films produced in Oceania by country of origin.

== Fiji ==
- Flynn (1996)
- Pear ta ma 'on maf (2004)

== Kiribati ==
- Te Maraia (2014)

== Niue ==
- Niue: People of the Reef (2003)
- Niue: Snake Island (2009)
- Niue: Sons from Afar (2011)
- Niue: This Is Your Land (2005)

== Papua New Guinea ==
- Black Harvest (1992)
- Bridewealth for a Goddess (2000)
- Ileksen (1979)
- Papa Bilong Chimbu (2007)
- Sanctum (2011)
- Tinpis Run (1991)
- Tukana - husat i asua (1983)
- Wokabaut Bilong Tonten (1974), a.k.a. Tonten's Travels

== Samoa ==
- O Le Tulafale (The Orator) (2011 feature film)
- Va Tapuia (Sacred Spaces) (2009 short film)

== Tonga ==
- Tavake (2006)

== Tuvalu ==
- Return to Paradise: A Peace Corps Story (2020 documentary film)

== Vanuatu ==
- Tanna (2015 feature film)
