= Sălcuța serial killer =

Unsolved serial murders in Romania

Details
- Victims: 5–11
- Span of crimes: 1992–1999
- Country: Romania
- State: Bistrița-Năsăud County

The Sălcuța serial killer is the name given to an unidentified Romanian serial killer believed to be responsible for at least five murders committed in the village of Sălcuța from 1992 to 1999.

A shepherd named Francisc Trombițaș was prosecuted for these crimes but was exonerated of all charges in 2009. The statute of limitations on all murders has since passed, meaning that even if the culprit is found, he cannot be prosecuted.

== Murders ==
=== Confirmed ===
The first confirmed murders date back to the night of March 24 to 25, 1992, when 64-year-old Domnița Macarie was raped and strangled in Sălcuța. This crime was witnessed by a neighbor named Ioan Frătean, who was subsequently hit on the head by the perpetrator, crushing his temple. Frătean was still alive when found, but died from his injuries in the hospital, unable to provide any details. The double murder quickly drew the attention of the local police, and even though a list of suspects was formed, all of them were eventually ruled out.

Two years later, on the evening of February 27, 1994, 58-year-old Anica Rus lost one of her sows and went out looking for it near the village's Cultural Home, where it usually hid. At that time, a man cornered her, tore the kerchief off her head and strangled her with it. This was accidentally witnessed by 68-year-old Elena Conț, who was out to deliver a glass of milk to her sister. She attempted to run away, but the killer caught up to her, raped her, and then strangled her with her kerchief. Both women's bodies were later found thrown down a dry well.

The final confirmed murder took place in the neighboring village of Vermeș on October 17, 1999. On that day, a curious neighbor went to the house of Viorică Trombițaș, as they were concerned that the talkative old lady had not left her house all day. Finding nobody in the front yard, he peeked through a window which had been partially covered with a blanket, only to see her body on the floor. The man ran to the house of another neighbor, and both then called the police. An examination of the crime scene uncovered that Trombițaș had been sexually assaulted and strangled with a nylon stocking.

=== Alleged ===
Aside from these killings, villagers have claimed that up to six additional deaths dating back to 1989 were also the doing of the serial killer. Some of these differed significantly in modus operandi, such as an elderly man being supposedly poisoned. However, authorities have attributed these deaths to natural causes and accidents, and are not officially included in the case.

== Suspects ==
=== Francisc Trombițaș ===
Shortly after Viorică's murder, police arrested her 63-year-old brother-in-law Francisc Trombițaș, an illiterate shepherd from the village of Jimbor who suffered from facial nerve paralysis on one side of the face. He became a suspect once authorities learned that he had proposed to Viorică once and had been rejected, after which he supposedly told her to undress. According to a neighbor, however, that was an in-joke that the pair made with one another.

This announcement was met with disbelief and protests from his family and fellow villagers, most of whom believed that he was a scapegoat for the police. Trombițaș himself would later recant his confessions, claiming that the police had promised to give him sheep. Iosif Mureșan, the chief prosecutor for this case, described him as a "cunning criminal", but during an interview with a newspaper, he admitted that Trombițaș had "forgotten" how he had killed the victims so he had to guide him on how they killed.

==== Prosecution and acquittal ====
Despite the lack of any evidence and a questionable confession, prosecutors still decided to prosecute Francisc Trombițaș for the five murders. He was found not guilty by a regional court in 2004, but prosecutors appealed to the Court of Appeal in Cluj-Napoca. Trombițaș' health significantly worsened during this ordeal, and had to be placed in his family's care.

On May 29, 2009, the Court of Appeal found him not guilty on all charges, officially exonerating Trombițaș. Five months later, the 73-year-old died at his cottage in Jimbor from an undisclosed illness. A lawsuit was filed against the Romanian state for the false accusations and imprisonment was terminated due to his death.

=== Other suspects ===
During the investigation into the murders, two alternative suspects were proposed. One of them was a young man named Viorel Salvan, who allegedly said that he was going to kill Macarie after she had exposed him for several thefts. Additionally, Macarie was found to be holding streaks of blond hair at the crime scene, which is the exact same hair color as Salvan's. However, police attributed this to her pulling her own hair out, despite the fact it had already gone white.

The other suspect was a man named Marton Blaj, who allegedly had attempted to rape several elderly women around Sălcuța. No evidence supporting their claims ever surfaced, and Blaj was never charged. He then moved to work abroad.

== Status ==
Since Trombițaș' death, nobody else has been charged with any of the murders. The statute of limitations for the final murder passed in 2014, meaning that even if the real perpetrator is located, he cannot be prosecuted.

== See also ==
- List of serial killers by country
- List of miscarriage of justice cases
