= Peggy Fairbairn-Dunlop =

Samoan-New Zealand academic

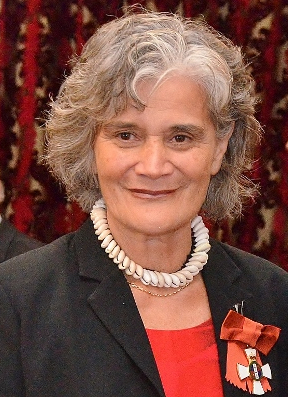
- Fairbairn-Dunlop in 2015
- Education: Macquarie University
- Scientific career
- Fields: Pacific Studies
- Workplaces: University of the South Pacific, Auckland University of Technology, UNDP, UNIFEM and UNESCO
- Thesis: "E au le inailau a tamaitai" : women, education and development, Western Samoa (1991)
- Doctoral students: Esther Tumama Cowley-Malcolm; Karanina Sumeo

Margaret Ellen Fairbairn-Dunlop CNZM is a Samoan-New Zealand academic. She is the first person in New Zealand to hold a chair in Pacific studies.

== Education ==
Fairbairn-Dunlop studied at Victoria University of Wellington, graduating with a Master of Arts degree. She completed a PhD at Macquarie University in Australia.

== Career ==
Fairbairn-Dunlop lived in Samoa from 1981 to 2005, where she worked for aid organisations based in the Pacific such as UNDP, UNIFEM and UNESCO.

On her return to New Zealand, she was appointed the inaugural director of Va’aomanu Pasifika, the Pacific Studies department at Victoria University of Wellington.

Fairbairn-Dunlop was the founding Professor of Pacific Studies at Auckland University of Technology. She is also chair of the Health Research Council Pacific team and sits on a number of Ministry of Education and Ministry of Health committees, the Social Sciences committee of the Royal Society Te Apārangi and the UNESCO Social Sciences Committee.

In 2013 she was appointed president of PACIFICA, an organisation that aims to help Pacific Island women to participate in and contribute to public life in New Zealand.

=== Recognition ===
In the 2008 New Year Honours, Fairbairn-Dunlop was appointed an Officer of the New Zealand Order of Merit, for services to research on families. In the 2015 Queen's Birthday Honours, she was promoted to Companion of the New Zealand Order of Merit, for services to education and the Pacific community.

Fairbairn-Dunlop won the Ministry of Education (New Zealand) Pacific Education Award at the SunPix Awards 2022. She said, "“I hope the young people coming through have watched and learned from our generation and seen what they can do and what they should do for our people.”
