= Wairoa Māori Film Festival =

The Wairoa Māori Film Festival is New Zealand's premiere Māori and indigenous film festival.

The festival is held annually in the small coastal town of Nūhaka, Hawke's Bay, during the Matariki celebration period.

The festival first occurred in 2005 and is now an annual event. In 2008, the festival travelled to other centres in New Zealand, including Auckland and Wellington, and now travels each year, including to international locations.

The Wairoa Māori Film Festival is held at the historic Kahungunu Marae in New Zealand, and is supported by the New Zealand Film Commission.

== Festival Awards ==
Each year the festival presents a range of awards for best Māori and indigenous films. Short films are judged by the attending audience, with other awards decided by a panel of guest judges.

2005

- Short Film Drama (Aotearoa) Award: Two Cars, One Night (director, Taika Waititi)
- International Indigenous Entry Award: Te Toa Āniwaniwa (director and producer, Robert Pouwhare)
- Short Documentary (Aotearoa) Award: Buy Culturalism (director Mark Sweeney)
- Feature Documentary (Aotearoa) Award: Tuhoe: A History of Resistance (director, Robert Pouwhare)
- Feature Drama (Aotearoa) Award: Whale Rider (director, Niki Caro)
- Festival Prize: Pear Ta Ma'On Maf / The Land Has Eyes, Feature Drama, (director, Vilsoni Hereniko, Rotuma, Fiji)

2006

- Short Film Drama (Aotearoa) Award: The Speaker (director, Tearepa Kahi)
- International Indigenous Entry Award: The Gathering Return of the Whale Dreamers (director, Kim Kindersley)
- Short Documentary (Aotearoa) Award: So Far, Yet So Close (director, Sophie Zhang)
- Feature Documentary (Aotearoa) Award: Squeegee Bandit (director, Sandor Lau)
- Best Te Reo Maori Entry: Nga Kaitiaki O Te Mauri (director, Phil England)
- Festival Prize: The Waimate Conspiracy (director, Stefen Lewis)

2009

- Short Film Drama (Aotearoa) Audience Award: Warbrick (directors, Pere Durie and Meihana Durie)
- International Indigenous Entry Award: Tnorala Baby Falling (director, Warwick Thornton)
- Feature Drama/Documentary (Aotearoa) Award: Taking the Waewae Express (directors, Andrea Bosshard and Shane Loader)
- Festival Prize: Rain of the Children (director, Vincent Ward)
