= Copenhagen International Film Festival =

Former Danish film festival

Coordinates: 55°40′34″N 12°34′06″E

Copenhagen International Film Festival (CIFF) was a film festival held annually in Copenhagen, Denmark, from 2003 to 2008. The main prize, the Golden Swan, was awarded for Best Film, Best Director, Best Actress, Best Actor, Best Script and Best Cinematography. In 2009, CIFF merged with the NatFilm Festival to become the CPH PIX film festival.

== Regular award winners ==
Year	Best Film	Best Director	Best Actress	Best Actor	Best Script	Best Cinema- tographer	Best Female Director	Politiken Audience Award	Lifetime Achievement Awards
2003	Song For a Raggy Boy (Aisling Walsh)	Bent Hamer (Kitchen Stories)	Stephanie Léon (Bagland)	Kristoffer Joner (Himmelfald)				Afgrunden (Torben Skjødt Jensen)	Vera Gebuhr; Gabriel Axel
2004	The Granny (Lidija Bobrova)	Nimród Antal (Kontroll)	Anna Maria Mühe (Love in Thoughts)	Luis Tosar (Te doy mis ojos)	Lidija Bobrova (The Granny)	Gyula Pados (Kontroll)	Guka Omarova (Shiza)	Kongekabale (Nicolaj Arcel)	István Szabó
2005	Live and Become (Radu Mihaileanu)	Bent Hamer (Factotum)	Lili Taylor (Factotum)	Ion Fiscuteanu (The Death of Mr. Lazarescu)	Radu Mihaileanu (Live and Become)	Gyula Pados (Fateless)	Yasmine Kassari (The Sleeping Child)	Harry's Daughters (Richard Hobert)	Costa-Gavras; Nicolas Roeg
2006	12:08 East of Bucharest (Corneliu Porumboiu)	Kim Rossi Stuart (Along the Ridge)	Heidrun Bartholomäus (Happy as One)	Ulrich Mühe (Das leben der Anderen)	Corneliu Porumboiu (12:08 East of Bucharest)	Stefano Falivene (Along the Ridge)	Valeska Grisebach (Sehnsucht)	Das Leben der Anderen (Florian Henckel von Donnersmarck)	Henning Carlsen

== Other awards ==
=== 2003 ===
Special Grand Prize of the Jury
Rithy Panh (S21: The Khmer Rouge Killing Machine)
The Special Jury Award
Sylvain Chomet (The Triplets of Belleville (Les Triplettes de Belleville))

=== 2004 ===
Grand Jury Special Prize
Nina Choubina and Anna Ovsiannikova (The Granny)
Special Lifetime Achievement Award
Abbas Kiarostami
The Hans Morten prize (70.000 Euro)
Mette Heeno

=== 2005 ===
Grand Prix du Jury
The Death of Mr. Lazarescu (Cristi Puiu)
Honorary Award
Nils Malmros
Emir Kusturica
