= Larry Santana =

Papua New Guinean painter (born 1962)

Larry Santana (born 1962 in Ramu Valley, Papua New Guinea) is a Papua New Guinean painter.

Larry's original surname was 'Mike' i.e. Larry Mike and he studied under that name at the Goroka School of Art and Design in 1979. One of his painting tutors at that time was New Zealander Roger Smith. Another was Willi Stevens, who designed the Papua New Guinean currency.

Santana's paintings often depicts topics related to modernity, tradition and social alienation. His 1988 self-portrait was entitled Struggle and Pain at the Six Mile Dump. Among his other works, Santana was commissioned to embellish Port Moresby Airport. In 1996, he painted the murals of the ANZAC Memorial in Port Moresby, where he currently lives. His work has been displayed in international exhibitions in Belgium and the United States.

Santana's art was featured on the cover of the eighteenth edition of The Contemporary Pacific, in autumn 2006.
