= Malmkrog =

2020 film

- Film poster
- Directed by: Cristi Puiu
- Written by: Cristi Puiu
- Produced by: Anca Puiu
- Starring: Frédéric Schulz-Richard
- Cinematography: Tudor Vladimir Panduru
- Production companies: Bord Cadre Films; Centre National du Cinéma; Cinnamon Films
- Release date: 20 February 2020 (Berlin)
- Running time: 201 minutes
- Country: Romania
- Languages: Hungarian; French; Russian; German

Malmkrog is a 2020 internationally co-produced drama film directed by Cristi Puiu.

Set in turn-of-the-20th-century Transylvania, at the snowy hillside manor of a blithe aristocrat named Nikolai (Frédéric Schulz-Richard), the film follows for nearly the entirety of its 200 minutes a series of winding conversations between a group of bourgeois elite—among them a Russian general's wife (Diana Sakalauskaité), a devout young Christian girl (Marina Palii), a Franco-Russian nobleman (Ugo Broussot), and a middle-aged woman (Agathe Bosch) whose pessimistic worldview seems to embody the essence of Solovyov's book.

The conversations always return to a central topic: whether one should adopt a non-violent approach to the organisation of society (Tolstoy's attitude, which Solovyov abhorred), or approach the duty of fighting war in a fervently committed, Christian spirit.

It was shown in the Encounters section at the 70th Berlin International Film Festival, where it also won the Best Director Award.

== Cast ==
- Frédéric Schulz-Richard as Nikolai
- Agathe Bosch as Madeleine
- Marina Palii as Olga
- Diana Sakalauskaité as Ingrida
- Ugo Broussot as Edouard
- István Téglás as István
- Zoe Puiu as Zoechka
