= Jeannette Paulson Hereniko =

American film producer

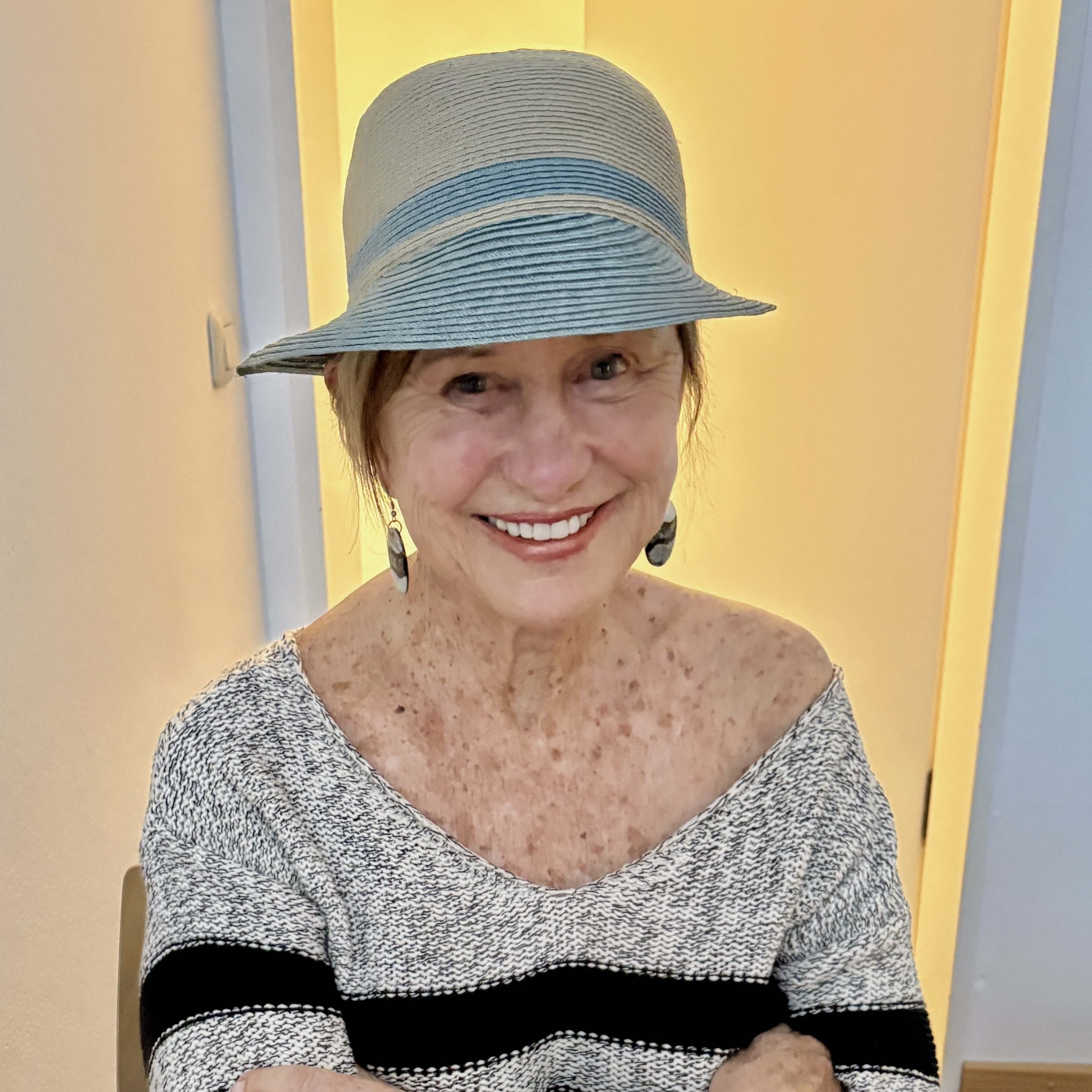
- Born: Jeannette Lee Butts; May 23, 1940 (age 86); Portland, Oregon, United States
- Citizenship: United States
- Education: Chaminade University (B.Ed.), University of Hawaiʻi at Mānoa (M.A., American Studies, 1984)
- Occupation: Film festival director and founder, filmmaker
- Spouses: G. William Paulson (m. 1960–1979) Vilsoni Hereniko (m. 1997)
- Children: Brad William Paulson, Kelly Colleen Paulson, Holly Paulson Sereni
- Writing career
- Subjects: Asia-Pacific and Cultural
- Notable work: The Land Has Eyes (producer)
- Notable awards: Korean Cinema Award for lifetime promotion of Korean cinema, Busan International Film Festival, 2009; HIFF Legacy Award, HIFF, 2022
- Website: wildwisdomthepodcast.com

Jeannette Paulson Hereniko (born 1940) is an American storyteller, film producer, community organizer, and cultural advocate. She is best known for founding the Hawaii International Film Festival (HIFF), and for her promotion of Asia-Pacific and Indigenous cinema. She is also known for her award-winning films including The Land Has Eyes.

== Early life and education ==
Jeannette Lee Butts was born on May 23, 1940 and was raised in Portland, Oregon. In 1958, she graduated from Jefferson High School. She earned a Bachelor of General Studies (BGS) with a major in education from Chaminade University in Honolulu, and a Master's degree (MA) in American Studies from the University of Hawaiʻi at Mānoa in 1984, with a focus on the American reception of Asian cinema.

== Career ==
From 1970 to 1975, Hereniko served as "Storyteller in the Schools" for the Southern Oregon Regional Educational District. After relocating to Hawai'i in 1975, she held a similar position as a Storyteller in the Schools with the State of Hawai'i Department of Education from 1975 to 1978.

In 1976, she joined Hawai'i's Department of Education's Educational Television (ETV) program as a production assistant and later became a producer/writer. While there, she wrote and directed the documentary Taro Tales, with cultural guidance from Eddie Kamae and music by the Sons of Hawai'i.

Separately from her work at ETV, she co-produced and co-wrote The 'Āina Remains, an independent, community-based video created in collaboration with the Nuʻuanu-Punchbowl Neighborhood Board and funded by the Hawai'i Committee for the Humanities. One notable scene reenacts Queen Lili'uokalani's garden club gathering flowers in Uluhaimalama, the queen's garden.

Raising local financing and gathering a volunteer staff, Hereniko launched the first Hawaii International film Festival on November 1, 1981. She directed HIFF from 1981 to 1996, and in 1990, the festival became an independent nonprofit organization separate from the East-West Center. Under her leadership, HIFF developed into a major platform for cross-cultural dialogue and a showcase for films from Asia and the Pacific.

In 1990, she was named the inaugural director of the Palm Springs International Film Festival (PSIFF). That same year, she became a founding board member of the international nonprofit organization, Network for the Promotion of Asian Cinema (NETPAC) and later established NETPAC/USA, where she compiled packages of Asian films for educational institutions across the United States.

In 1996, she was appointed by Dr. Elizabeth Daley of the University of Southern California's Annenberg Center for Communication to incubate a digital database of Asia-Pacific films. That project became the foundation for AsiaPacificFilms.com, which launched in 2009 as a subscription-based streaming service for universities. The platform was later acquired by Alexander Street Press, where she continued as a film curator until 2018.

In 1997, she and her husband, Vilsoni Tausie Hereniko, established Te Maka Productions. Their first collaboration, Fine Dancing , a stage production performed on a beach in Honolulu, premiered in August 1997. They later produced the short films Just Dancing, Salisi, and Woven, followed by the narrative feature film The Land Has Eyes, which was written and directed by Vilsoni and produced by Jeannette.

The Land Has Eyes was filmed in 2000 on the island of Rotuma, where Vilsoni Hereniko was born and raised. With the exception of Māori actress Rena Owen and one other actor, the cast was composed entirely of first-time Rotuman performers, most of whom had never seen a film. The film premiered at the Sundance Film Festival, won Best Feature Film at the imagineNATIVE Film + Media Arts Festival, screened in film festivals and commercial theaters around the world and was Fiji's official 2004 Academy Awards submission for Best International Feature Film.

Hereniko has served on juries at international film festivals including Berlin, Pusan, Singapore, Mumbai, Brisbane, and New Delhi. In 2007, she was named to the nomination council for the inaugural Asia Pacific Screen Awards in Brisbane, Australia.

In 2022, HIFF created the Jeannette Paulson Hereniko HIFF Legacy Award, named in her honor as founder, and made her the inaugural recipient.

== Personal life ==
Hereniko was previously married to G. William Paulson with whom she has three children. In 1997, she married playwright and professor Vilsoni Hereniko. Together they have a blended family that includes seven grandsons.

While raising her children in southern Oregon, Hereniko (then Paulson) began storytelling at the Jackson County Library. In 1963, she co-founded the Storytelling Guild and served as its first president. Under her leadership, the guild established the Children's Festival in 1964 at the Peter Britt Gardens in Jacksonville, Oregon. Both the festival, which she directed from 1967 to 1972, and the guild continue to operate as of 2026.

She also wrote and performed two autobiographical one-woman shows, Wild Wisdom, a two-act stage play about events in her life, and When Strangers Meet, which she performed in Hawai'i, California, and Oregon.

== Awards and recognition ==
- Zonta Southern Oregon Woman of the Year (1973)
- Honolulu YWCA Most Outstanding Woman in Arts and Humanities (1984)
- Busan International Film Festival Korean Cinema Award for lifetime promotion of Korean cinema (2009)
- Hawaii Venture Capital Association Entrepreneur of the Year Award for Digital Media (2009)
- Hawai'i International Film Festival Legacy Award (2022)
