= Center for Pacific Islands Studies =

Coordinates: 21.30092°N 157.81508°W

The Center for Pacific Islands Studies, in the University of Hawaiʻi at Mānoa School of Pacific and Asian Studies, is both an academic department and a research center on the Pacific Islands and issues of concern to Pacific Islanders. Its instructional program is regional, comparative, and interdisciplinary in nature.

The university's Pacific Collection is a comprehensive collections of Pacific materials. The center provides international conferences, Web-based resources, its Pacific Islands Monograph Series, and its journal, The Contemporary Pacific.
