= Vlad Dogaru =

Romanian basketball player

No. 14 – CSU Asesoft Ploiești
- Position: Guard
- League: Liga Națională

Personal information
- Born: February 21, 1985 (age 41) Ploiești, Romania
- Listed height: 6 ft 1 in (1.85 m)
- Listed weight: 176 lb (80 kg)

Career information
- Playing career: 2006–present

Career history
- 2006–2007: CSU Asesoft Ploiești
- 2007–2008: BC Târgoviște
- 2008–2012: CSU Asesoft Ploiești
- 2012–2013: BC Miercurea Ciuc
- 2013–2014: BC Argeș Pitești
- 2014–present: CSU Asesoft Ploiești

Vlad Dogaru (born February 21, 1985) is a Romanian professional basketball player for CSU Asesoft Ploiești of the Romanian League. He has won 3 titles with Asesoft between the years 2009 and 2012 and 3 times the Romanian National Cup.
