= Răzvan Rădulescu =

Romanian novelist and screenwriter (born 1969)

Răzvan Rădulescu (Romanian pronunciation: [rəzˈvan rəduˈlesku]; born October 23, 1969) is a Romanian novelist and screenwriter. His first novel, The Life and Deeds of Elijah Cazane, won the Romanian Writers' Union prize for best debut novel. His second novel, Theodosius the Small, received the EU Prize for Literature.

Rădulescu was born in Bucharest. As a screenwriter, he has collaborated with numerous Romanian directors including Cristi Puiu, Cristian Mungiu, Alexandru Baciu, Radu Muntean and Constantin Popescu. He has written numerous screenplays, including Goods and Money (2001) and Niki Ardelean, Colonel in Reserve (2001), Feed for Small Fry (2004), Offset (2004), The Death of Mr Lazarescu (2005), which were co-written with Puiu, and The Paper Will Be Blue (2005), written in collaboration with Baicu and Muntean.

Rădulescu studied at the Faculty of Foreign Languages and the Music Academy in Bucharest. His literary debut was a in a group anthology entitled Family Portrait (1995).
