= Sapeta Taito =

Fijian actress (born 1986)

- Born: Sapeta Sokag‘aitu Taito; 1986 (age 38–39); Suva, Fiji

Sapeta Sokag‘aitu Taito (born 1986) is a Fijian actress. She played the lead role in Fiji's first feature film, The Land Has Eyes, in 2004.

== Biography ==
Born in Suva, Fiji, Taito moved to Rotuma at a young age. She studied at the Lelean Memorial School in Suva, and then studied science at the University of the South Pacific, majoring in biology and chemistry, with the aim of later studying medicine and becoming a surgeon.

== The Land Has Eyes ==
She auditioned successfully for the lead role, that of a young Rotuman woman, in the Rotuman-language film The Land Has Eyes, despite never having seen a film before. She attended the film's world premiere at the 2004 Sundance Film Festival, travelling outside Fiji for the first time to do so.
