= Wokabaut Bilong Tonten =

1979 Australian / Papua New Guinean film

- Directed by: Oliver Howes
- Written by: Oliver Howes
- Produced by: Don Murray
- Starring: Turuk Wabei
- Release date: October 1974
- Running time: 87 minutes
- Countries: Papua New Guinea; Australia
- Language: Tok Pisin
- Budget: $80,000

Wokabaut Bilong Tonten, also known as Tonten's Travels, is a 1974 Australian film filmed in Papua New Guinea with an indigenous cast. It was created for the Papua New Guinean government as a film promoting unity in the recently independent country. It was shot in Pidgin with English subtitles.

== Plot ==
After his wife dies Tonten travels across the country in search of his missing brother in law.

== Cast ==
- Turuk Wabei as Tonten
- Anton Sil as Aki
- Elmis Nugur
- Pearson Vetuna
- Idau Rei
- John Nilkare
- Dorcas Thomas

== Reception ==
Colin Bennett in the Age said "By the end I knew more of PNG than most non-fiction cinema has told me ... and had learned it painlessly, the easy way. Wokabaut, despite some understandable unevenness in the acting, contains a good deal more than novelty value. An achievement for both countries - one hopes the first of many."
