= Katerina Teaiwa =

Pacific scholar, artist and activist

Katerina Teaiwa (born Katerina Martina Teaiwa), is a Pacific scholar, artist and teacher of Banaban, I-Kiribati and African American heritage. Teaiwa is well known for her scholarly and artistic work that focuses on the history of British Phosphate Commissioners mining activity in the Pacific during the 1900s and the consequent displacement of Banabans. In 2022, she became the first Indigenous woman from the Pacific to win the Australian University Teacher of the Year award and be promoted to full professor at the Australia National University.

== Biography ==
Katerina Teaiwa has paternal links to Banaba and Tabiteuea in Kiribati and maternal links to Washington D.C in the United States. Teaiwa was born in Savusavu, Fiji and raised in Lautoka and Suva, Fiji. Her father, John Tabakitoa Teaiwa, is from Tabiang and Tabwewa villages on Banaba and Rabi in Fiji, and Eita and Utiroa villages on Tabiteuea. He is a former Chairman of the Rabi Council of Leaders and the first Banaban to attend university. Her mother, Joan Martin Teaiwa is from Washington D.C. Katerina has two sisters, Teresia Teaiwa and Maria Teaiwa-Rutherford. She attended St Joseph's Secondary School and Yat-Sen Primary School in Suva.

Teaiwa received a Bachelor of Science from Santa Clara University in California and a Master of Arts in Pacific Islands Studies from University of Hawaiʻi. She completed her PhD in anthropology from Australian National University

== Career ==
Teaiwa spent three years at University of Hawaiʻi at Mānoa as an assistant professor. Teaiwa then returned to Australian National University where she founded and was convenor of the Pacific Studies teaching program. Furthermore, she was Head of Gender, Media and Cultural Studies program, School of Culture, History and Language, College of Asia and the Pacific at the Australian National University. In 2008 she founded the Pasifika Australia Outreach Program. Teaiwa is the President of the Australian Association for Pacific Studies having previously served in that role 2012 - 2017 and as Vice-president 2017-2025.

Through her background in contemporary Pacific dance, Teaiwa and the late Seiuli Allan Alo, co-founded the Oceania Dance Theatre at University of the South Pacific in Fiji, 1999.

She was elected a Fellow of the Australian Academy of the Humanities in 2025.

=== Project Banaba l ===
Following on from her research work for her book 'Consuming Ocean Island: Stories of People and Phosphate from Banaba', Teaiwa presented a solo multimedia exhibition that commemorated the history of Banaba Island. Project Banaba was commissioned by Carriageworks Cultural Precinct in Sydney and curated by internationally acclaimed Pacific artist Yuki Kihara.

Project Banaba was then on show at MTG Hawke's Bay Tai Ahuriri in New Zealand in 2019.

== Publications ==
- Teaiwa K. 'Consuming Ocean Island: Stories of People and Phosphate from Banaba'. Indiana University Press. 2014.
- Stupples P & Teaiwa K. 'Contemporary Perspectives on Art and International Development'. Routledge. 2016.
