= The Contemporary Pacific =

- Discipline: Pacific studies
- Language: English

Publication details
- History: 1989–present
- Publisher: University of Hawaii Press (USA)
- Frequency: semiannual

Standard abbreviations
- ISO 4: Contemp. Pac.

Indexing
- ISSN: 1043-898X (print); 1527-9464 (web)

Links
- Journal homepage

The Contemporary Pacific: An Interdisciplinary Journal is an academic journal covering a wide range of disciplines with the aim of providing comprehensive coverage of contemporary issues in the Pacific Islands region and diaspora, including Melanesia, Micronesia, and Polynesia. It features refereed, readable articles that examine social, economic, political, ecological, arts and cultural topics, along with political reviews, book and media reviews, resource reviews, and a dialogue section with interviews and short essays. Each recent issue highlights the work of a Pacific Islander artist.

== History ==
The journal was founded at the University of Hawaiʻi Center for Pacific Islands Studies under the directorship of Robert C. Kiste, with then-CPIS faculty member Brij Lal serving as editor of volumes 1–4. The historian David Hanlon edited volumes 5–10, the anthropologist Geoffrey M. White edited volumes 11–13, the playwright Vilsoni Hereniko edited volumes 14–20, the political scientist Terence Wesley-Smith and anthropologist Alexander Mawyer. Katerina Teaiwa from the Australian National University currently edits volumes and is the first woman to lead the journal. The journal continues to be based at the UH Center for Pacific Islands Studies and published by the University of Hawaiʻi Press. CPIS also edits and UH Press publishes the related Pacific Islands Monograph Series.

From volume 15 (2003), the journal began featuring the work of a different Pacific Islander artist on the cover and inside each issue. Among the artists featured so far are John Pule of Niue, Kapulani Landgraf of Hawaiʻi, Rongotai Lomas of New Zealand, Ake Lianga of the Solomon Islands, Meleanna Aluli Meyer of Hawaiʻi, Ric R Castro of Guam, Albert Wendt of Samoa, Larry Santana of Papua New Guinea, Shigeyuki Kihara of New Zealand, Ralph Regenvanu of Vanuatu, Carl Franklin Kaʻailāʻau Pao of Hawaiʻi, Jewel Castro of Samoa, Lingikoni Vaka'uta of Tonga, Daniel Waswas of Papua New Guinea, Sue Pearson of Norfolk Island, Michael Tuffery of New Zealand, Niki Hastings-McFall of New Zealand, Solomon Enos of Hawaiʻi, Andy Leileisi'uao of Samoa, Ani O'Neill of New Zealand, and the Jaki-Ed Collective in the Marshall Islands.

== Access ==
The Contemporary Pacific appears semiannually. Its first electronic edition appeared in 2000 on Project MUSE. Back issues are being added to an open-access archive in the University of Hawaii at Mānoa's ScholarSpace institutional repository.
