= Dana Dogaru =

Romanian actress

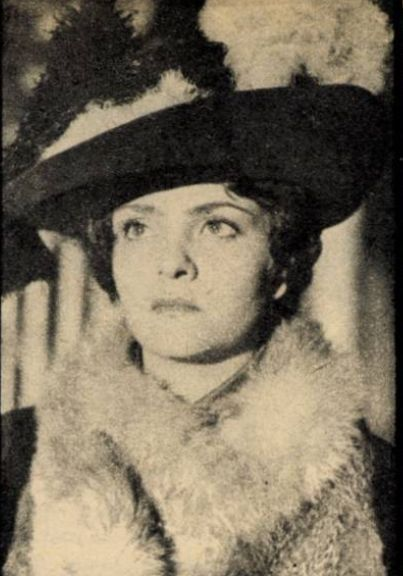
- Born: Dana Mihale; 1 August 1953 (age 73); Bucharest, Romania
- Education: Caragiale National University of Theatre and Film
- Occupation: Actress
- Years active: 1977–present
- Employer: Nottara Theater
- Spouses: Mihai Dogaru (died) Gelu Colceag (divorced) Sorin Puia (m. 1987; died 2022)
- Awards: National Order of Faithful Service, Knight rank (2002); Gopo Awards for best actress for role in Sieranevada (2017)

Dana Dogaru (born Dana Mihale, 1 August 1953) is a Romanian actress. She appeared in more than twenty films since 1977 and played at the Nottara Theater in Bucharest. In 2017 she received the Gopo Awards for best actress for her role in Sieranevada.

Born in Bucharest, she graduated in 1976 from the Caragiale National University of Theatre and Film, where she studied under Beate Fredanov. She married actor Mihai Dogaru, with whom she had a daughter, Irina; three years later, her husband died of lung cancer, at age 39.

Dogaru made her film debut in 1977 in E atât de aproape fericirea, directed by Andrei Cătălin Băleanu. She made her theater debut the same year as Eva in The Broken Jug by Heinrich von Kleist. In 2002, she was awarded the National Order of Faithful Service, Knight rank.

== Selected filmography ==
Year	Title	Role	Notes
1977	E atât de aproape fericirea	Eugenia	
1977	Iarba verde de acasă		
1978	Eu, tu, și... Ovidiu	Dana	
1981	Întoarce-te și mai privește o dată	Vasineta	
1982	Rămân cu tine	Saveta	
1982	Calculatorul mărturisește		
1984	Încrederea		
1984	Acasă		
1987	Vulcanul stins	Maria	
1988	Expediția	Forester's wife	
1988	Hanul dintre dealuri	Innkeeper's widow	
1994	Conferință la nivel înalt	Eva Braun	
2005	The Death of Mr. Lazarescu	neighbor Mihaela	
2006	The Paper Will Be Blue	Doamna Andronescu	
2009	Francesca	Doamna Elena	
2009	Cealaltă Irina		
2016	Sieranevada	Doamna Mirică	
2017	O grămadă de caramele	Tuța Găleată	
2018	Moromeții 2	Catrina Moromete	
2024	Moromeții 3	Catrina Moromete	
2024	Scara B	D-na Henter	
