= Sânmihaiu de Câmpie =

- Commune
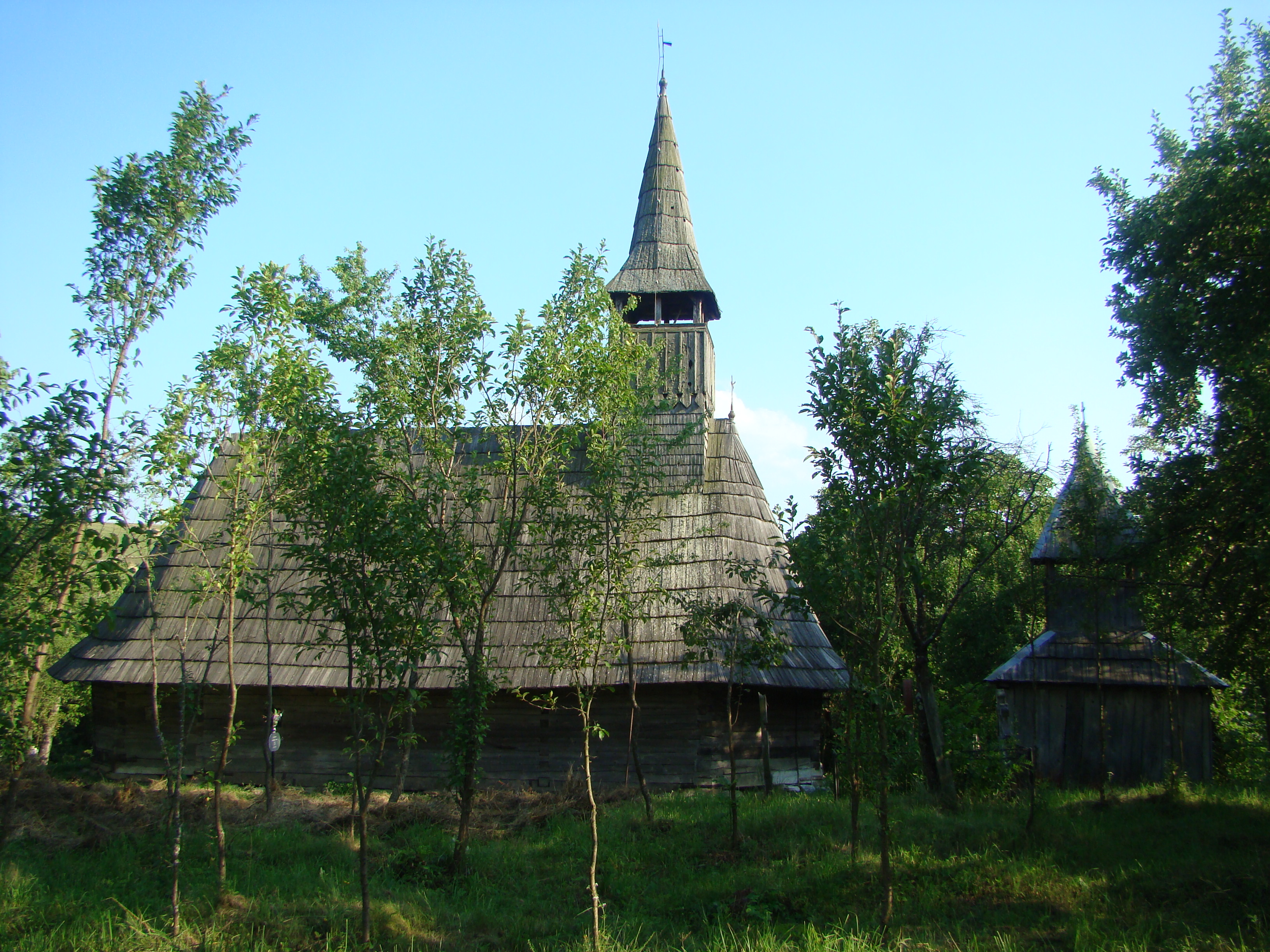
- Wooden church from Sălcuța

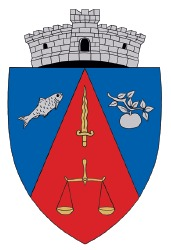
- Coat of arms

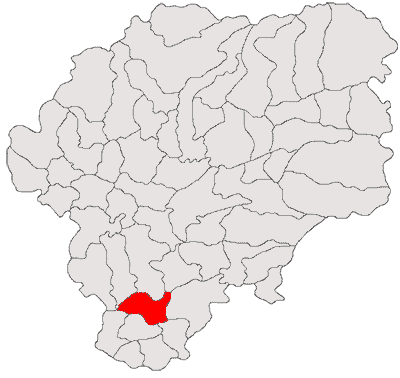
- Location in Bistrița-Năsăud County

- Location in Romania
- Coordinates: 46°54′N 24°20′E
- Country: Romania
- County: Bistrița-Năsăud

Government
  - Mayor (2020–2024): Ioan Mate (PSD)
- Area: 64.25 km^{2} (24.81 sq mi)
- Elevation: 352 m (1,155 ft)
- Population (2021-12-01): 1,167
  - Density: 18.16/km^{2} (47.04/sq mi)
- Time zone: UTC+02:00 (EET)
  - Summer (DST): UTC+03:00 (EEST)
- Postal code: 427260
- Vehicle reg.: BN
- Website: www.sinmihaiudecimpie.ro

Sânmihaiu de Câmpie (formerly Zentmyhaltelke, later Szent Mihály Telke; Hungarian: Mezőszentmihály; German: Michelsdorf auf der Heide) is a commune in Bistrița-Năsăud County, Transylvania, Romania.

It is composed of six villages: Brăteni (Mezőbarátfalva), La Curte (Köbölkútitanyák), Sălcuța (formerly Fiscut; Fűzkút; German: Feiskut), Sânmihaiu de Câmpie, Stupini (Mezősolymos) and Zoreni (formerly Lumperd; Lompérd; German: Lompert).

The commune is located in the southern part of the county, on the Transylvanian Plateau. It lies 43 km (27 mi) from the county seat, Bistrița, close to the borders with Mureș and Cluj counties; Târgu Mureș is 62 km (39 mi) to the south, while Cluj-Napoca is 78 km (48 mi) to the west.

Sânmihaiu de Câmpie is traversed by county roads DJ151 and DJ162. The commune has a train station that serves the Căile Ferate Române Line 406, which comes from Bistrița Bârgăului and Bistrița North and leads to the town of Luduș in Mureș County.

Sights include the wooden church from Sălcuța and the wooden church from Zoreni.

At the 2011 census, Sânmihaiu de Câmpie had a population of 1,459. According to the census, 85.74% of inhabitants are Romanians, 8.7% Roma, and 2.26% Hungarians.

== Natives ==
- Ioan Fiscuteanu (1937–2007), theater and film actor
- Todor Stanca (1884–?), farmer and delegate at the Great National Assembly of Alba Iulia of December 1, 1918

== See also ==
- Sălcuța serial killer
