= Papua New Guinea National Research Institute =

Papua New Guinea research institute

Coordinates: 9.40995°S 147.16411°E

The Papua New Guinea National Research Institute (PNG NRI) is a public policy and development research institute in Papua New Guinea. After independence it was established as an independent statutory authority by Act of Parliament. It absorbing other institutes in 1988, and took its current name in 1993.

== History ==
In 1961 the New Guinea Research Unit (NGRU) was established in Port Moresby as part of the Australian National University. When PNG gained independence in 1975, the NGRU became the Institute for Applied Social and Economic Research (IASER), established by legislative act. IASER began functioning formally on 1 January 1976, expanding its scope to publish monographs, discussion papers and bibliographies.

In 1988 IASER absorbed both the Educational Research Unit (originally part of the University of Papua New Guinea) and the Institute of Papua New Guinea Studies (IPNGS). The IPNGS had existed from 1974 to 1988, with a mandate to preserve and research "traditional indigenous culture" in Papua New Guinea. Ulli Beier was director from 1974 to 1978; subsequent directors were John Kolia, Kumalau Tawali and Andrew Strathern.

In 1993 the name of the institute changed to be the National Research Institute.
