= Cristi Puiu =

Romanian filmmaker (born 1967)

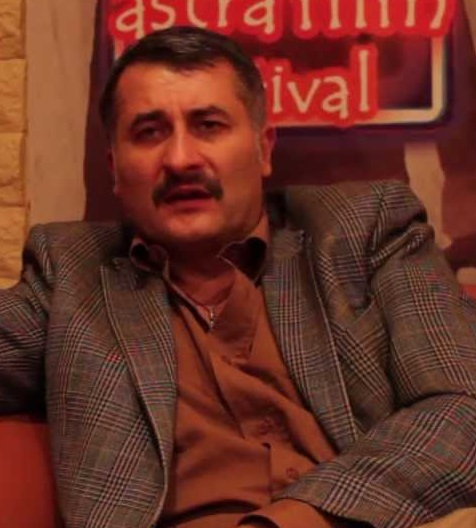
- Born: Cristian Emilian Puiu; 3 April 1967 (age 59); Bucharest, Romania
- Occupations: Film director, screenwriter
- Spouse: Anca Puiu

Cristi Puiu (Romanian pronunciation: [ˈkristi ˈpuju]; born 3 April 1967) is a Romanian film director and screenwriter. With Anca Puiu and Alex Munteanu, he founded the cinema production company Mandragora in 2004.

== Early life, education and career ==
Cristian Emilian Puiu was born to Iuliana and Emilian Puiu in Bucharest, Romania. Puiu's first interest in art was painting. In 1992, he was admitted as a student to the Painting Department of École Supérieure d'Arts Visuels in Geneva. After the first year he switched to film studies at the same school, where he graduated in 1996. He started working in film after his return to Romania.

He is married to Anca Puiu. He and Anca have three children: Smaranda, Ileana and Zoe.

== Career ==
=== Director ===
Cristi Puiu's debut as a director was in 2001 with the low-budget road movie Stuff and Dough (Marfa și banii), starring Alexandru Papadopol and Dragoș Bucur. The film received several awards in international film festivals and competed in the Quinzaines des Realisateurs section of the Cannes Film Festival. Some critics say that this is the film that started the Romanian New Wave in cinema. He continued with a short film, Cigarettes and Coffee (Un cartuş de Kent și un pachet de cafea) (2004), which was awarded the Golden Bear for best short film at the 2004 Berlin International Film Festival.

His second feature film, The Death of Mr. Lazarescu (Moartea domnului Lăzărescu) (2005), was a dark comedy about an ailing old man who is carried by an ambulance from hospital to hospital all night long, as doctors refuse to treat him and send him away. The film was a critical success, being awarded the Prix Un Certain Regard at the Cannes Film Festival and numerous awards at other international film festivals.

In 2006 this film gained 47 prizes, several nominations in the American Critics' Top 10 lists and in French magazines such as Telerama and Les Inrockuptibles.

=== Screenwriter ===
Cristi Puiu co-wrote the screenplays of both his feature films, Stuff and Dough (2001) and The Death of Mr. Lazarescu (2005), with Romanian writer Răzvan Rădulescu. Puiu independently wrote the screenplay for his short film Cigarettes and Coffee (2004).

In collaboration with Răzvan Rădulescu, Puiu wrote the screenplay for Niki and Flo, commissioned by Lucian Pintilie, one of the most important Romanian directors. In 2005 German director Didi Danquart based the movie Offset on a script written by Puiu.

==== Six Stories from the Outskirts of Bucharest ====
Puiu intends to make a series of six movies entitled Six Stories from the Outskirts of Bucharest. In part he has envisioned them in response to the French director Éric Rohmer's Six Moral Tales series, which influenced filmmaking in the late 20th century. Puiu intends the series to explore six types of love stories, The Death of Mr. Lazarescu being about love for one's fellow man.

He plans the next five films to study love between a man and a woman, love for one's children, love of success, love between friends, and carnal love. Cristi Puiu says that he has completed a synopsis for each of these films. The second film, Aurora, was screened in the Un Certain Regard section at the 2010 Cannes Film Festival. His film Sieranevada took part in competition in 2016 Cannes Film Festival.

== Filmography ==
=== Feature films ===
| Year | English Title | Original Title | Notes |
|---|---|---|---|
| 2001 | Stuff and Dough | Marfa și banii | World premiere at the Directors Fortnight section of the 2001 Cannes Film Festival |
| 2005 | The Death of Mr. Lazarescu | Moartea domnului Lăzărescu | Un Certain Regard prize at the 2005 Cannes Film Festival |
| 2010 | Aurora | | World premiere at the Un Certain Regard section of the 2010 Cannes Film Festival |
| 2016 | Sieranevada | | World premiere at the main competition of the 2016 Cannes Film Festival |
| 2020 | Malmkrog | | World premiere at the Encounters section of the 70th Berlin International Film Festival |
| 2023 | MMXX | | World premiere at the main competition of the 71st San Sebastián International Film Festival |
| TBA | Saint Andrew of the Wolves | La Saint-André des loups | Post-production |

=== Short films ===
- 2004: Cigarettes and Coffee (Un cartuș de Kent și un pachet de cafea)
- 2014: Bridges of Sarajevo (segment, documentary)

== Awards ==
- 2005 Cannes Film Festival – Un Certain Regard Award for The Death of Mr. Lazarescu
- 2005 Chicago International Film Festival – Silver Hugo Special Jury Prize for The Death of Mr. Lazarescu
- 2005 Copenhagen International Film Festival – Grand Prix du Jury for The Death of Mr. Lazarescu
- 2005 Reykjavik International Film Festival – Discovery of the Year Award for The Death of Mr. Lazarescu
- 2004 Berlin International Film Festival
  - Golden Bear for Best Short Film for Cigarettes and Coffee
  - UIP Berlin Award (European Short Film) for Cigarettes and Coffee
- 2002 Angers European First Film Festival – Procirep Award for Stuff and Dough
- 2002 Buenos Aires International Festival of Independent Cinema – Abasto Award for Stuff and Dough
- 2001 Cottbus Film Festival of Young East European Cinema
  - Findling Award for Stuff and Dough
  - Special Prize in Feature Film Competition for Stuff and Dough
- 2001 Thessaloniki Film Festival – FIPRESCI Prize for Stuff and Dough
