= Pacific studies =

Study of the Pacific region

Pacific studies is the study of the Pacific region (Oceania) across academic disciplines such as anthropology, archeology, art, economics, geography, history, linguistics, literature, music, politics, or sociology.

In the fields of anthropology and linguistics, Oceania is often subdivided into Melanesia, Micronesia, and Polynesia, while also including Australasia. In archeology and prehistory, Oceania extends into the southern Pacific Rim of Asia, especially the islands now comprising Indonesia, Malaysia, the Philippines, and Taiwan. Study of the history, economics, and politics from the colonial period on is inextricably bound to that of the major colonial powers: Britain, France, Germany, Japan, the Netherlands, Spain, Russia, the United States, and later Australia, New Zealand, and Indonesia. The field is sometimes seen as including Hawaiian studies and Māori studies.

For many Pacific Islanders, Pacific studies involves projects of cultural renaissance, the reclamation and reassertion of cultural identity, while for many others, Pacific studies tends to focus more on modernization and development, on how to understand the region in ways that will improve people's lives. Wesley-Smith observed that a third rationale for Pacific Studies, particularly amongst outsiders to the Pacific, was driven by geopolitical considerations evident in Area Studies.

== History ==
The Australian National University established its Research School of Pacific Studies in 1946. The University of Hawaii at Manoa in 1950 began offering the first graduate-level course in Pacific Studies in 1950. Both of these early establishments were driven by a desire of their funding countries for better understanding of the Pacific region, with ANU having a particular focus on Papua New Guinea. In 1976 the newly formed University of the South Pacific established the Institute of Pacific Studies under Professor Ron Crocombe. Unlike its Australian and American counterparts, this was driven by a desire to deepen students' awareness of Pacific identity and the region. A foundation course in Pacific studies is still included in every USP undergraduate programme. In New Zealand, the University of Auckland's Pacific Studies programme was established in the 1990s and driven by the needs and concerns of New Zealand Pacific islanders.

== Institutions ==
- Australian National University
- Brigham Young University–Hawaii
- CNRS
- EHESS
- National Museum of Ethnology, Japan
- SOAS
- San Diego State University
- San Francisco State University
- Tokyo University of Foreign Studies
- University of Auckland
- University of Canterbury
- University of California, San Diego
- University of Hawaii at Manoa
- University of Oregon
- University of Otago
- University of the South Pacific
- Victoria University of Wellington
- University of Victoria, Canada
- City College of San Francisco
- College of San Mateo

== Journals and associations ==
The Association for Social Anthropology in Oceania (ASAO) was established in 1967 and focuses on comparative studies of Pacific topics. The European Society for Oceanists (ESFO) was established in 1992. The Australian Association for Pacific Studies (AAPS) was formed in 2004.

Journals include:

- Pacific Affairs
- The Pacific Review
- Asian Perspectives
- Oceanic Linguistics
- Manoa
- Pacific Science
- Pacific Studies (journal)
- The Contemporary Pacific
- The Journal of Pacific History
- MATAMAI: An Anthology of Poems, Short stories, songs, and art by students of Pacific Islands Studies
