= Vilsoni Hereniko =

Fijian filmmaker

- Born: October 13, 1954 (age 72); Hapmak, Itu'ti'u, Rotuma
- Education: University of the South Pacific; University of Newcastle-upon-Tyne
- Occupation: Professor at University of Hawaiʻi
- Known for: Writer & Director of The Land Has Eyes

Vilsoni Hereniko (born 13 October 1954) is a Rotuman playwright, screenwriter, film director, academic, author, actor, poet, and master weaver. He is best known as the writer-director of The Land Has Eyes (Rotuman: Pear ta ma ʻon maf), the first feature film shot on Rotuma, and for a long academic career as a scholar of Pacific literature, theatre and film. Hereniko has served as director of Pacific studies centres, edited the academic journal The Contemporary Pacific, lectured widely, and in recent years has produced short films, documentaries, and scholarly essays that foreground Indigenous aesthetics and cultural practice.

He is a professor at the School of Cinematic Arts at the University of Hawaiʻi.

== Biography ==
Vilsoni Hereniko was born in Mea village, Hapmak, Itu'ti'u District, Rotuma, Fiji, on 13 October 1954 and is the youngest of eleven children. He won a scholarship to Queen Victoria School in Fiji and later studied at the University of the South Pacific (USP). Hereniko received a Master of Education from the University of Newcastle-upon-Tyne and a Ph.D. in literature and language from the University of the South Pacific. His early experience of Rotuman oral storytelling strongly influenced his later creative and scholarly work.

== Career ==
=== Literary and theatre work ===
Hereniko began publishing plays in the mid-1970s. His stage works—many of which have been produced throughout the Pacific and are taught in schools—include Don't Cry, Mama, A Child for Iva, Sera's Choice, The Monster, Last Virgin in Paradise (co-written with Teresia Teaiwa), Sina & Tinilau (a children’s book and stage adaptation), Fine Dancing, Love 3 Times (commissioned by Kumu Kahua Theatre) and Moana: The Rising of the Sea (a musical about climate change that toured Bergen, Copenhagen, Brussels and St. Andrews in 2015 and adapted into a film under the title of Moana Rua: The Rising of the Sea).

His books include Woven Gods: Female Clowns and Power in Rotuma and the edited volume Inside Out: Literature, Cultural Politics, and Identity in the New Pacific (co-edited with Rob Wilson). In 1997 Hereniko received the Elliot Cades Writing Award for his body of creative work.

=== Film ===
Hereniko wrote and directed the feature film The Land Has Eyes (Pear ta ma ʻon maf), filmed on Rotuma and premiered at the Sundance Film Festival in 2004; the film also screened at numerous international festivals and was Fiji’s official submission for the Academy Awards. It received the "Best Overall Entry" award at the 2005 Wairoa Maori Film Festival, and the "Best Dramatic Feature" award at the 2004 ImagineNATIVE Film and Media Arts Festival.

The film tells the story of Viki (Sapeta Taito), a young Rotuman woman shamed as the daughter of a man wrongly accused of theft who finds inspiration in the legend of a “Warrior Woman” from Rotuman oral tradition.

Hereniko’s earlier film work includes short films and documentaries such as The Han Maneak Su in a Rotuman Wedding (The Rotuman Clown) and Just Dancing. In recent years he has directed an animated short Sina Ma Tinirau (2022) and a narrative Woven, a story about an indigenous basket weaver who struggles to complete a coconut leaf basket in a city of high rises.

Hereniko has served on the jury and selection committee of the Hawai‘i International Film Festival. The Land Has Eyes, set in his native Rotuma, was his first feature film, in 2004. It was presented at the Sundance Film Festival in 2004, and was Rotuma's official submission to the 2006 Academy Awards.

=== Academic appointments and editorial work ===
Hereniko joined the University of Hawaiʻi at Mānoa in 1991 and has held the position of Director at the Center for Pacific Islands Studies (CPIS) at the University of Hawaiʻi and Acting Chair at the School of Cinematic Arts (formerly a part of Hawaiʻi’s statewide Academy for Creative Media). He has also served as Director of the Oceania Centre for Arts, Culture and Pacific Studies at the University of the South Pacific in Fiji.

Hereniko edited the journal The Contemporary Pacific from 2002 to 2008 and 2022 and has been active in developing Pacific Islands scholarship and creative practice at the university level. Multiple institutional profiles describe him as Rotuma’s first full professor and as his island’s principal playwright and filmmaker.

Hereniko wrote the first major academic study of indigenous Polynesian theatre for his Ph.D. titled Polynesian Clowns and Satirical Comedies. Later he revised this work for a book monograph published by the University of Hawaiʻi Press titled Female Clowns and Power in Rotuma. After teaching at the University of the South Pacific in Fiji for nearly ten years, the Center for Pacific Islands Studies at the University of Hawaiʻi hired him as an assistant professor in 1991. He became a full professor and the Director of CPIS for two years before taking a two-year stint as the Director of the Oceania Center for Arts and Culture at the University of the South Pacific (2010-2012). When he returned to Hawaiʻi, he moved his academic position to what is now called the School of Cinematic Arts at the University of Hawaiʻi where he remained until the end of his academic career.

=== Activism and other works ===
Hereniko has served as a cultural consultant on major projects that engage Pacific cultural traditions and practices for example, he is listed among cultural consultants credited on Disney’s animated feature Moana. He has been active in Pacific cultural networks, film festival juries and programming, and public scholarship about indigenous storytelling, filmmaking as well as climate and cultural sustainability. He has delivered keynote addresses and distinguished lectures for the Association of Social Anthropology (ASAO), the Oceania Comparative and International Education Society (OCIES), European Society for Oceanists (ESFO) and the Australian Association for the Advancement of Pacific Studies.

He was President of NETPAC/USA, a chapter of the international organization of NETPAC which exists to foster and promote films from Asia and the Pacific, from 2015 to 2025.

Since the COVID-19 pandemic Hereniko has developed a practice as a master weaver of coconut-leaf baskets. Several of his woven baskets have been exhibited in curated shows in Hawaiʻi, including at the Festival of Pacific Arts (2024); one of his coconut-leaf baskets was selected for acquisition by Hawaiʻi's State Foundation on Culture and the Arts (SFCA) for its Art in Public Places Collection. Hereniko’s film Woven foregrounds this art practice by featuring a weaver as central protagonist and by making the director an on-screen performer.

== Awards and honors ==
Hereniko's honours include the Elliot Cades Writing Award (1997) for "a significant body of work of exceptional quality," a Presidential Citation for teaching from the University of Hawaiʻi (2000), a visiting fellowship at Corpus Christi College, Cambridge (2005), a fellowship at LMU Munich (2025), and selection as a visiting academic and artist (Taiwan, 2025), and in 2022 a "Star of Oceania" award in film, media and the arts. His films and stage works have won awards including recognition at ImagineNATIVE Film + Media Arts Festival in Canada ("Best Dramatic Feature” in 2004) and the inaugural Wairoa Maori Film Festival in New Zealand ("Best Overall Entry, 2005).

His short films especially Sina ma Tinirau and Woven also won several awards and screened at many international and indigenous film festivals.

== Filmography ==
- The han maneʻak su in a Rotuman Wedding , a short documentary on the Rotuman ritual clown, shot on his home island of Rotuma, submitted as a part of his Ph.D. titled Polynesian Clowns and Satirical Comedies.
- Just Dancing – a narrative short adapted from his play Fine Dancing. Screened at a number of film festivals including the Palm Springs Short Film Festival and the Busan International Film Festival.
- The Land Has Eyes – Narrative feature film; premiered at the Sundance Film Festival (2004); Fiji's first Academy Awards submission (2005); Winner, Best Dramatic Feature at the Toronto ImagineNative Film + Media Arts Festival (2004) and the Festival Prize (“Best Overall Entry”) at the Wairoa Maori Film Festival in New Zealand (2005).
- Sina ma Tinirau – Animated short; Winner of five awards, including Best Short at the Berlin Independent Film Festival (2023), the Los Angeles International Film Festival (2023), and Made in Hawaiʻi Film Festival (2022).
- Woven – Live action short film; Hereniko's screen acting debut, portraying a master weaver and indigenous artist. Nominated for "Best Short" at the Hawaiʻi International Film Festival and Winner at the Nature Without Borders International Film Festival (2024).

== Bibliography ==
=== Books ===
- Two Plays, 1987, ISBN 982-02-0015-6
- The monster and other plays, 1989, ISBN 982-02-0028-8
- The wicked cat, 1991, ISBN 982-01-0073-9
- Last virgin in paradise: A serious comedy, 1993, ISBN 982-02-0084-9
- Woven Gods: Female Clowns and Power in Rotuma, 1995, ISBN 0-8248-1655-2
- Sina & Tinilau, 1997 (children's book), ISBN 982-02-0127-6
- Inside Out: Literature, Cultural Politics, and Identity in the New Pacific, 1999 (as co-editor), ISBN 0-8476-9142-X
- Hereniko, Vilsoni (1987). South Pacific Islanders. Rourke Publishing, LLC. ISBN 978-0-86625-259-1.
- TEAIWA, Teresia; HERENIKO, Vilsoni; GOPE, Pierre; THOMAS, Larry; KURTOVITCH, Nicolas; GOBRAIT, Valérie; APIO, Alain (2013-10-27). Théâtre Océanien: Anthologie (in French). Au vent des îles. ISBN 978-2-36734-031-9.
- Hereniko, Vilsoni (2019-01-01), "Virtual museums and new directions?", Curatopia, Manchester University Press, pp. 327–335, ISBN 978-1-5261-1819-6

=== Articles/essays (Selected) ===
- Hereniko, Vilsoni (2024). "Activating the Vā: Performance, Academia and the Sublime — Association for Social Anthropology in Oceania (ASAO) 2023 Distinguished Lecture". Oceania. 94 (2): 138–150. doi:10.1002/ocea.5405. ISSN 0029-8077.
- Hereniko, Vilsoni (2022). "Editor's Note: Interdisciplinarity Reimagined". The Contemporary Pacific. 34 (2): ix–xvii. doi:10.1353/cp.2022.0058. ISSN 1527-9464.
- Hereniko, Vilsoni (2019-07-15). "Authenticity in Cinema: Notes from the Pacific Islands". Journal de la société des océanistes (1): 65–72. doi:10.4000/jso.10633. ISSN 0300-953X.
- "The Canoe, The Wind, And The Mountain: Shunting the "Rashomon Effect" of Mauna Kea". hilo.hawaii.edu.

== Plays ==
- 2010/2015. Moana: The Rising of the Sea (Writer/Producer/Co-Director), Premiered at the Japan Center, University of the South Pacific, Fiji, in 2010 and revised for the European tour in 2015. Tour of Europe included Bergen (Norway), Copenhagen (Denmark), Brussels (Belgium), and St. Andrews (Scotland). Also adapted for the screen under the title Moana Rua: The Rising of the Sea. Unpublished Play.
- 2012. Drua: The Wave of Fire (Executive Producer/Writer/Co-Director). Premiered at the Japan Center. Also represented the University of the South Pacific at the Festival of Pacific Arts held in the Solomon Islands. Unpublished Play.
- 2012. Vaka: The Birth of a Seer (Executive Producer). Premiered at the Japan Center, University of the South Pacific. Unpublished Play.
- 1999 Fine Dancing, Premiered at the beach of Magic Island Honolulu. Unpublished play.
- 1993 Last Virgin in Paradise. with Teresia Teaiwa. Suva: South Pacific Creative Arts Society.
- 1992 Sambo Meets the Goddess Devi on a Moonless Night in Mana. Volume 1. Number 2, 75–77.
- 1989 The Monster and Other Plays. Suva: South Pacific Creative Arts Society. (A collection of six one-act plays.)
- 1987 Two Plays: A Child for Iva/Sera's Choice. Suva: South Pacific Creative Arts Society. (A Child for Iva was first published by Heinemann, New Zealand.)
- 1977 Don't Cry, Mama. Suva: South Pacific Creative Arts Society. Reprinted in Chinese Journal of Oceanic Literature, Number 2, 1981. Excerpts of this play are reprinted in Creative Writing From Fiji, edited by Nandan and Atherton. Suva: Fiji Writers' Association, 1985.
