= Punjabi New Zealanders =

Panjābī Nīyūzīlaenḍar

Total population
- 34,227 (2018); 0.73% of the population

Languages
- Punjabi · Maori · English

Religion
- 79.7% Sikhism; 5.2% No religion 4.6% Hinduism; 3.9% Islam; 3.3% Christianity

Related ethnic groups
- Indian New Zealanders · Pakistani New Zealanders
- Include other religions

Punjabi New Zealanders are New Zealanders who are of Punjabi descent. Their ancestry originates wholly or partially in the Punjab region of South Asia, constituting a subgroup of Indian New Zealanders and Pakistani New Zealanders.

According to the 2018 New Zealand census, there were 34,227 Punjabi-speaking individuals in the country. Punjabi was the second most commonly spoken South Asian language in New Zealand after Hindi, and the 14th most common overall.

New Zealand has a historical and growing Sikh community, most of whom originate from Punjab. Punjabis were amongst the earliest immigrants from South Asia to arrive in New Zealand alongside the Gujaratis, during what was then the British Raj in the 1890s, and some of them married local Māori women, whose offspring became known as Māori Indians.

== Notable Punjabi New Zealanders ==
- Kanwaljit Singh Bakshi, National Party politician and former MP.
- Ashraf Choudhary, Labour Party politician and former MP.
- Billy Ibadulla, a Punjabi Christian and former Test cricketer for Pakistan, who emigrated to New Zealand in 1976.
- Abraham Salaman, a Punjabi Muslim merchant and herbalist who arrived in New Zealand in 1903.
- Amandeep Singh, first-class cricketer.
- Bhupinder Singh, first-class cricketer.
- Phomen Singh, confectioner who arrived in New Zealand in c. 1890.
- Ish Sodhi, New Zealand Test cricketer.
- Sukhi Turner, politician and former mayor of Dunedin.
- Jagt Singh, Indian New Zealand WWI soldier.

== See also ==
- Indian New Zealanders
- Pakistani New Zealanders
- Sikhism in New Zealand
