= Indian New Zealanders =

New Zealander citizens with Indian origin or descent

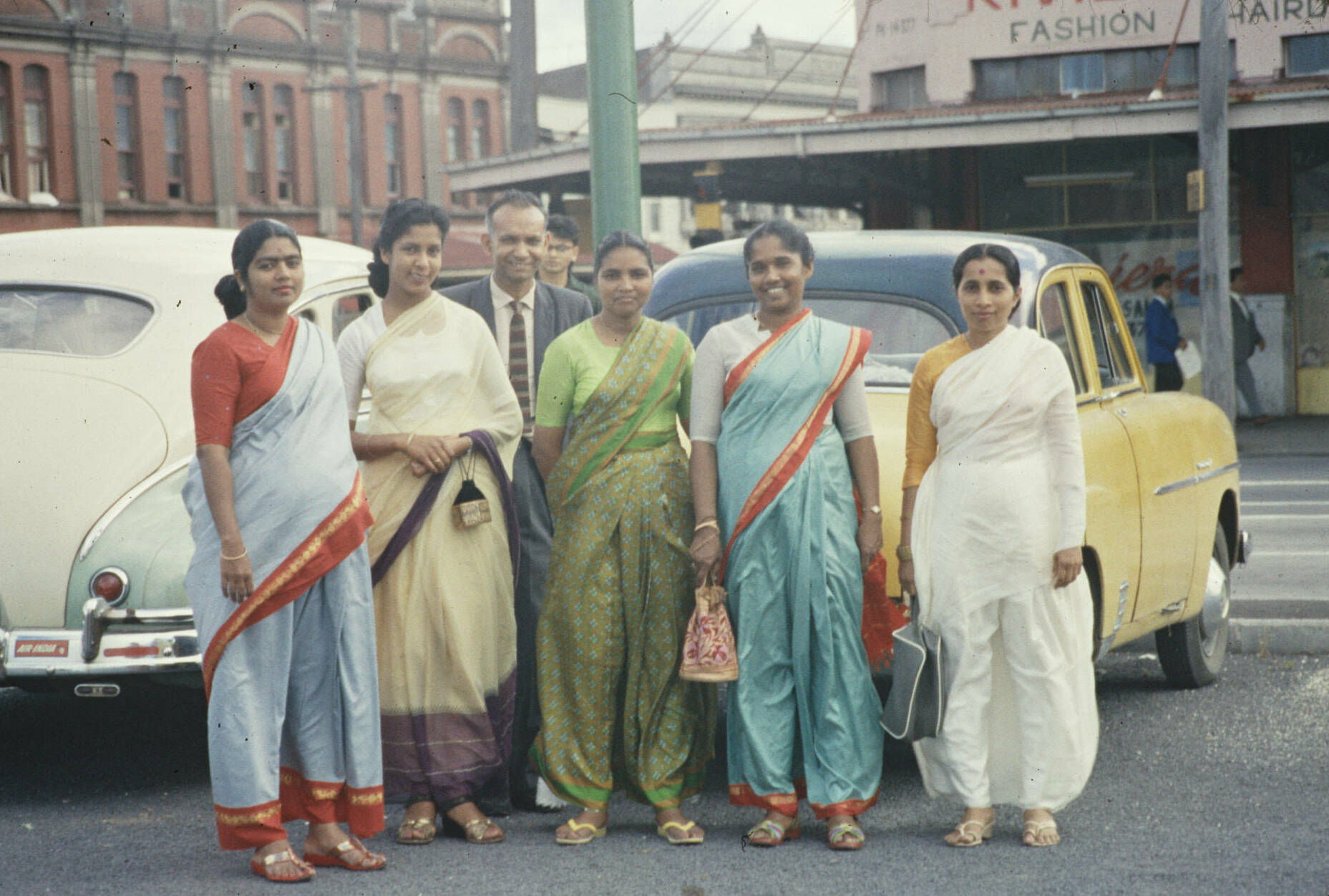
- Indian women in Grey Lynn, Auckland, in 1962

Total population
- 292,092 142,920 (born in India) 5.8% of the population of New Zealand (2023)

Regions with significant populations
- Auckland: 154,824
- Wellington: 22,227
- Waikato: 17,295
- Canterbury: 14,763
- Bay of Plenty: 10,335
- Manawatū-Whanganui region: 4,374

Languages
- English (Indian English • New Zealand English) • Hindi (Fijian Hindi) • Gujarati • Malayalam • Odia • Bengali • Punjabi • Marathi • Tamil • Telugu • Kannada

Religion
- Hinduism (Hinduism in New Zealand) (46.6%), Sikhism (21.4%), Christianity (15.1%), Islam (8.7%), no religion (8.1%), other religions (including Buddhism and Jainism) (0.1%)

Related ethnic groups
- Indian Australians • Māori Indians • Indo-Fijians • Fijian New Zealanders • Non-Resident Indians (NRIs)

Indian New Zealanders, informally known as Kiwi Indians, are people of Indian origin or descent who live in New Zealand. The term includes Indians born in New Zealand, as well as immigrants from India, Fiji, and parts of Africa, such as South Africa, Mauritius and Seychelles, as well as from other parts of the world. The term Indian New Zealander applies to any New Zealander with one or both parents of Indian heritage. Although sometimes the Indo-Kiwi definition has been expanded to people with mixed racial parentage with one Indian parent or grandparent, this can be controversial as it generally tends to remove the ethnic heritage or identity of the foreign parent or grandparent, which may be seen as insensitive to those with mixed parentage, who tend to value both their Indian and non-Indian parents and grandparents.

Indian New Zealanders are the largest group of New Zealand Asians. The largest number of Indians living in New Zealand are from Fiji. The fifth largest language in New Zealand is Hindi, shown in the 2018 census. According to ENZ.org (a New Zealand Government affiliate), since 2011, 18,000 Indians have migrated to New Zealand. In 2011, the Indian population in New Zealand was 155,000, so there are 174,000 Indians in New Zealand (2014) due to the additional immigration of 18,000. Most early New Zealand Indians were of Punjabi or Gujarati descent.

== History ==
Indians had been employed for a long time on the European ships trading in Colonial India and the East Indies. Many of the early voyages to the Pacific either started or terminated in India and many of these ships were wrecked in the uncharted waters of the South Pacific. Indians began to arrive in New Zealand in the late eighteenth century, mostly as crews on British ships. The earliest known Indians to set foot in New Zealand were Muslim lascars who arrived in Dec 1769 on the French East India Company's ship Saint Jean Baptiste captained by Frenchman Jean François Marie de Surville sailing from Pondicherry a union territory town bounded by the southeastern Tamil Nadu state, India. Their arrival marks the beginning of Indian presence in New Zealand, in which hundreds of unnamed Indian lascars visited New Zealand on European ships in order to procure timber and seal skins.

After establishment of first European colony in Sydney in Australia in 1788 by the colonial British Indian Empire under the British East India Company, the company had exclusive right on control of all trade to and from the penal colony. These colonies multiplied and expanded to include whole Australia, various Islands in Oceania, initially colonies were established under the British Indian Empire including New Zealand which was administered as part of New South Wales until 1841.

The period of Indian settlement begins with the earliest known Indian resident of New Zealand, a lascar of Bengali descent from the visiting ship City of Edinburgh who jumped ship in 1809 in the Bay of Islands to live with a Māori wife. Another took up residence on Stewart Island around the same time.

Possibly the earliest non-Māori settlers of the Otago region of South Island were three Indian lascars who deserted ship to live among the Māori in 1813. There, they assisted the Ngāi Tahu by passing on new skills and technologies, including how to attack colonial European vessels in the rain when their guns could not be fired. They integrated into Māori culture completely, receiving tā moko and taking on Māori names. An Indian whaler, Edward (Black) Peter, has found gold in the Otago region in 1858, but was not credited or rewarded for it until 1885.

There were a number of Indian soldiers who served New Zealand, 17 are recorded to have served in WWI and WWII. The most well documented of these soldiers being Jagt Singh who served in Gallipoli during WWI.

The late 1800s and early 1900s saw the first wave of migration of Indians arriving in the country. A number of them came directly to New Zealand but some came via Fiji and others via other British colonies such as Burma. A large number of these early migrants were Indian teenagers, mainly from Punjab and Gujarat. They were generally looked after by the Māori community, and tended to have unions with Māori women.

Official policy in New Zealand to restrict non-European immigration resulted in difficulties for Indians to enter the country in the 1920s. Groups like The White New Zealand League, established in 1926, was opposed to both Chinese and Indian immigration because it was seen as a threat to the economic prosperity of European New Zealanders. In the beginning of the 20the century, Indians were classified as "race aliens", which legally barred from any public service occupation such as police or the army, and also were not receiving any pensions. Early Indian migrants consciously chose jobs in remote areas that did not interest Pākehā: cutting grass, processing flax and digging drains. The shared experience of discrimination facilitated solidarity between members of different castes. On the other hand, The Shop and Office Act of 1921 allowed all British subjects to own shops and businesses, so many Indians struggling to find other employment became business owners, especially in dairies.

Racial tensions between local Indians and Pākehā lasted for decades in Pukekohe. Until the late 1950s, Indians there were excluded from barbershops, hair salons, bars, and balcony seats in cinemas, and could not join the local growers' association. At this time, a large number of Punjabi Sikhs, who often had farming experience, settled in the Waikato district and took up dairy farming.

Before the 1970s it remained difficult for Indians not related to the earlier immigrants to enter New Zealand. However, a small number of Fijian Indians and Indian-descent refugees from Uganda arrived in the country. By the 1980s, the official attitude towards Asian immigration relaxed and an increased number of Indians arrived in New Zealand.

=== Early cultural contact theory ===
In 1885, Edward Tregear published the controversial book The Aryan Maori (1885), in which he placed the Māori language in the ranks of the Indo-European language family. He further claimed, that Māori were descended from Hindu Brahmins who spread south from India.

The Tamil bell may indicate contact between Māori and South India going back to the 14th or 15th century. A 1954 report by V Lakshmi Pathy, published in the Journal of Polynesian Studies, hinted at similarities between the South Indian Kannada language and various Polynesian languages including Māori.

== Socioeconomics ==
=== Demographics ===
According to the 2023 New Zealand census, there were 292,092 ethnic Indians in New Zealand making up 5.8% of New Zealand's population. This is an increase of 52,899 people (22.1%) since the 2018 census, and an increase of 136,914 people (88.2%) since the 2013 census. In 2024, 12.6% of births in New Zealand were to ethnically Indian mothers.

There were 153,015 males, 138,513 females, and 561 people of another gender. The median age was 32.4 years, compared with 38.1 years for all New Zealanders; 63,015 people (21.6%) were aged under 15 years, 61,650 (21.1%) were 15 to 29, 148,704 (50.9%) were 30 to 64, and 18,720 (6.4%) were 65 or older.

In terms of population distribution, 60.2% of Indian New Zealanders lived in the Auckland region, 29.1% lived in the North Island outside the Auckland region, and 10.7% lived in the South Island. The Ōtara-Papatoetoe local board area of Auckland had the highest concentration of Indian people at 25.2%, with Papatoetoe in Auckland considered to be New Zealand's little India. The next highest concentrations are in the Puketāpapa local board area (22.6%) and the Papakura local board area (21.5%). Hamilton City has the highest concentration of Indian peoples outside of Auckland at 9.9%. The Chatham Islands had the lowest concentration, recording no Indian people in its area.

The proportion of Indian New Zealanders born overseas at the 2018 census was 76.2%, compared with 27.1% for all ethnicities. Nearly two-thirds (65.7%) of those born in New Zealand were aged under 15.

At the 2013 census, 72.0 percent of Indian New Zealanders aged 15 and over were in the labour force, of which 8.3 percent were unemployed. The large employment industries of Indians were retail trade (16.3 percent), health care and social assistance (11.7 percent), and accommodation and food services (9.7 percent).

=== Religion ===
Religion
Religion	Percent
Hinduism	46.6%
Sikhism	21.4%
Christian	15.1%
Muslim	8.7%
No Religion	8.1%

According to the 2018 New Zealand census, 46.6% of Indian New Zealanders identified as Hindus, 21.4% as Sikhs, 15.1% as Christians (where 6.4% as Catholic, 1.3% as Pentecostal, 0.5% as Anglican and 6.9% as other Christian), 8.7% as Muslims, while 8.1% identified themselves as having no religion.

== Notable individuals ==
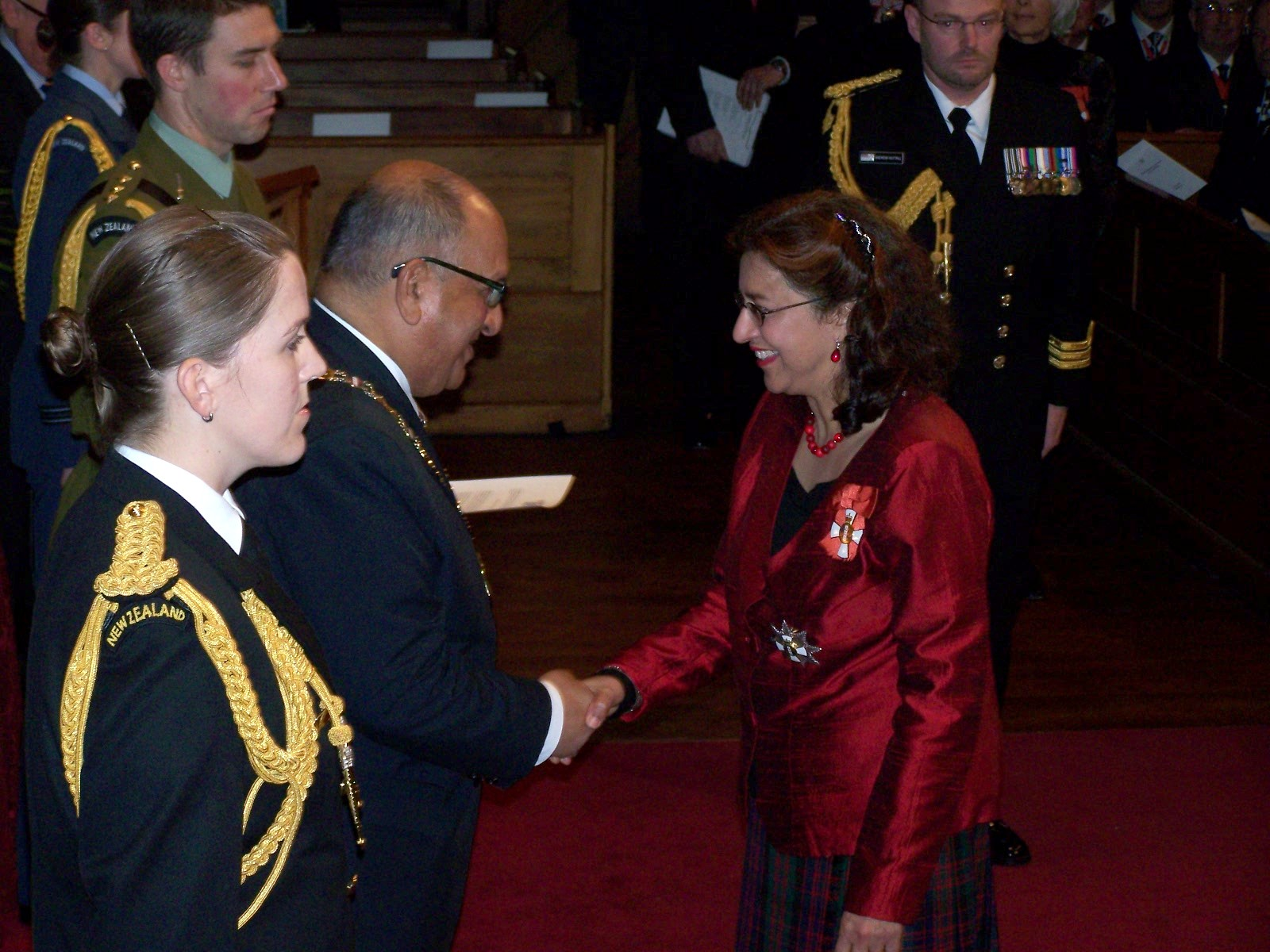
Anand Satyanand (centre left) served as the 19th Governor-General of New Zealand from (2006–2011), meeting Dame Sukhi Turner (right), Mayor of Dunedin (1995–2004)

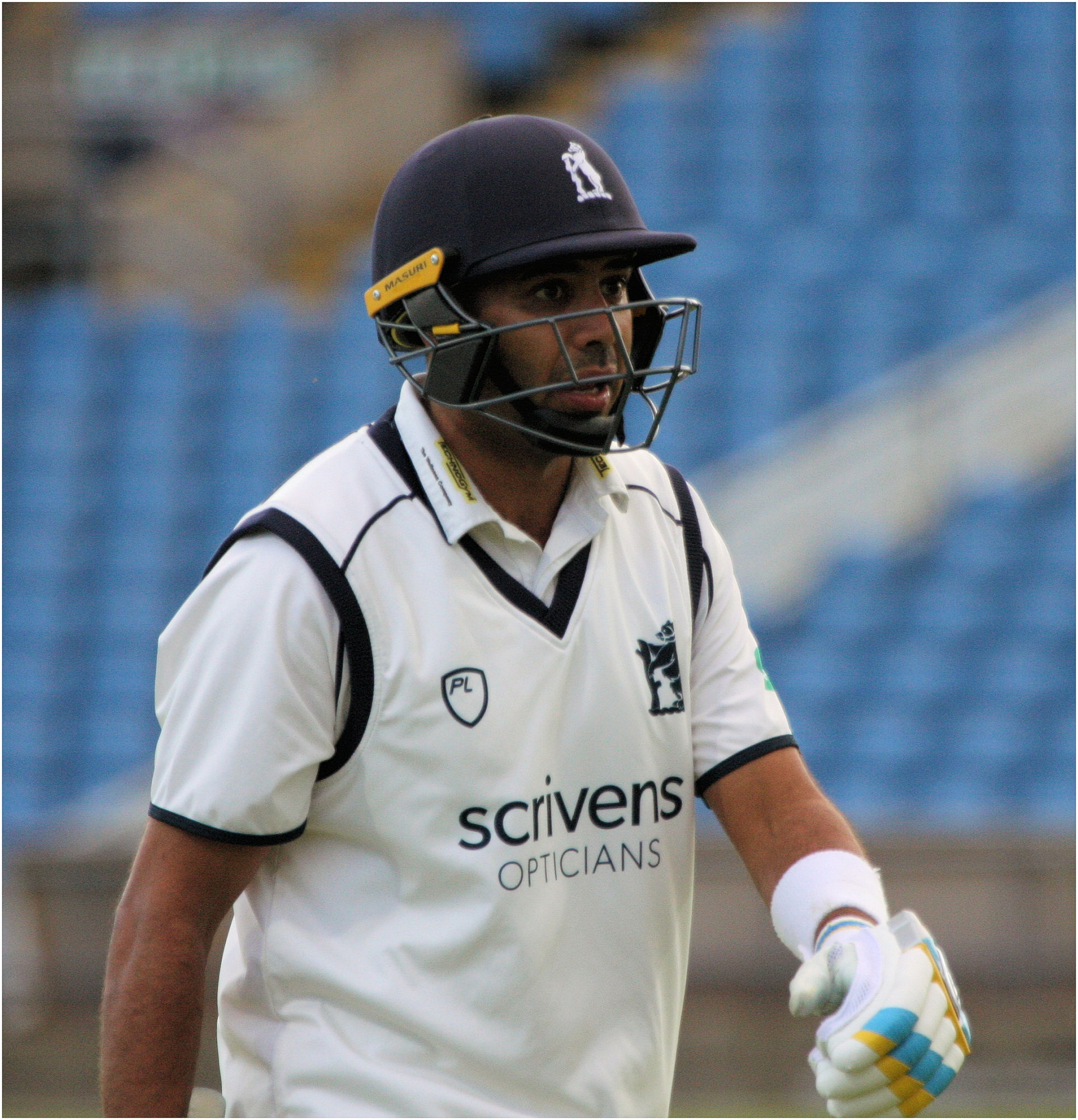
Cricketer Jeetan Patel

=== Business ===
- Ranjna Patel, businesswoman
- Nikhil Ravishankar, CEO of Air New Zealand

=== Entertainment ===
- Aaradhna Patel, R&B artist
- Shailesh Prajapati, New Zealand actor, best known for his role as Ernie in Power Rangers MegaForce
- Lesley-Ann Brandt, South African born actress
- Shirley Setia, New Zealand singer and actress
- Jacob Rajan, playwright and actor, whose most notable work is Krishnan's Dairy
- Madeleine Sami, New Zealand actor of Irish and Fiji Indian heritage, best known for her role as Tania in Sione's Wedding

=== Media ===
- Rohit Kumar Happy, editor of Bharat-Darshan, Hindi literary magazine
- Rebecca Singh, news presenter on the New Zealand television station TV3

=== Politics ===
- Gaurav Sharma, Member of Parliament (2020–2022)
- Priyanca Radhakrishnan, Member of Parliament since 2017 served as the 10th Minister for the Community and Voluntary Sector, 15th Minister for Youth and Minister for Diversity, Inclusion and Ethnic Communities in the Sixth Labour Government
- Kanwal Bakshi, Member of Parliament (2008–2020)
- Parmjeet Parmar, Member of Parliament (2014–2020) (2023 – present)
- Mahesh Bindra, Member of Parliament (2014–2017)
- Rajen Prasad, former Race Relations Commissioner and Families Commissioner, and Member of Parliament (2008–2014)
- Anand Satyanand, former Governor-General of New Zealand, appointed on 23 August 2006
- Ajit Swaran Singh, District Judge
- Dame Sukhi Turner, Mayor of Dunedin (1995–2004)

=== Sport ===
- Sarpreet Singh, football player currently playing as a midfielder for Bayern Munich II in Germany.
- Rocky Khan, rugby union player
- Dipak Narshibhai Patel, cricket player who has played 37 Tests and 75 one-day internationals for the New Zealand cricket team
- Jeetan Patel, former spin bowler for the New Zealand cricket team
- Ish Sodhi, current spin bowler for the New Zealand cricket team
- Jeet Raval, current test batsman for the New Zealand cricket team
- Ajaz Patel, current spin bowler for the New Zealand cricket team
- Jakob Bhula, New Zealand domestic cricketer
- Jacob Fonseca, New Zealand 2023 Fishing Champion
- Roneel Hira, New Zealand domestic cricketer
- Tarun Nethula, New Zealand domestic cricketer
- Rachin Ravindra, New Zealand cricketer
- Adithya Ashok, India-born New Zealand cricketer
- Ajeet Rai, tennis player

== Media ==
=== TV ===
APNA Television

=== Newspapers ===
- The Indian news
- Indian Weekender
- Indianz x-press
- Indian Newslink
- Multicultural Times
- Kuk Hindi samachar

Te Papa's third community exhibition to be held in the Community Gallery was about the Indian communities in New Zealand, called AAINAA - Reflections through Indian Weddings. It ran 21 Sep 2002 – 26 Sep 2004.

== See also ==
- India–New Zealand relations
- Indian Australians
- Māori Indians
- Punjabi New Zealanders
- Indian diaspora
- Indianisation
- Greater India
