= Fijian New Zealanders =

Total population
- 62,310, or 1.34% of the population of New Zealand (2018)

Regions with significant populations
- Auckland • Christchurch • Wellington • Hamilton • Lower Hutt

Languages
- New Zealand English • Fijian language • Fiji Hindi • Rotuman language

Religion
- Christianity • Hinduism • Islam • Sikhism • Irreligion

Related ethnic groups
- Fijians • iTaukei • Indo-Fijians • Rotumans • Pasifika New Zealanders • Indian New Zealanders • Rotuman New Zealanders • Pakistani New Zealanders

Fijian New Zealanders are persons of Fijian descent or ancestry who reside in New Zealand. Fijians are one of the largest immigrant groups in New Zealand. Most Fijian New Zealanders, regardless of ancestry, identify as Pasifika, due to their origins in Oceania and the Indo-Fijian New Zealanders are identified as Asian New Zealanders. Fiji is the seventh-most common country of birth of immigrants to New Zealand, and in 2023, Fiji was the fifth-most common country of origin of those who immigrated to New Zealand that year.

== Demographics ==
As of 2018, Fijian New Zealanders numbered 62,310, or 1.34% of the population of New Zealand.

In 2018, Fijian was the most spoken immigrant language in New Zealand; Fijian was spoken by 7,143 people, or 0.15% of the population of New Zealand. Other languages spoken by Fijian New Zealanders include Rotuman, & Fiji Hindi by the Indo-Fijian such as Gujarati, Punjabi, Telugu, and Tamil, and other immigrant-origin languages spoken in Fiji such as Chinese.

== Notable people ==
- Arthur Jennings (rugby union)
- Bernie Fraser (rugby union)
- Ron Williams (rugby union)
- Walter Little (rugby union)
- Amasio Valence
- Junior Tomasi Cama
- Tabai Matson
- Joeli Vidiri
- Parma Nand
- Joe Rokocoko
- Alex Hodgman
- Jono Gibbes
- Deacon Manu
- Paula Bale
- Seta Tamanivalu
- Sitiveni Sivivatu
- Waisake Naholo
- Lote Raikabula
- Savenaca Tokula
- Sevu Reece
- Hoskins Sotutu
- Isaia Walker-Leawere
- Jahream Bula
- Greg Smith (rugby union, born 1974)
- Nina Nawalowalo
- Erikana Pedersen
- Marc Hunter
- Taane Milne
- Jacob Ratumaitavuki-Kneepkens
- Emoni Narawa
- Grace Jale
- Jane Yonge
- Rocky Khan
- Jacob Ratumaitavuki-Kneepkens
- George Bower (rugby union)
- Joe Daymond
- Luke Willis Thompson
- Gina Cole
