= Sikhism in New Zealand =

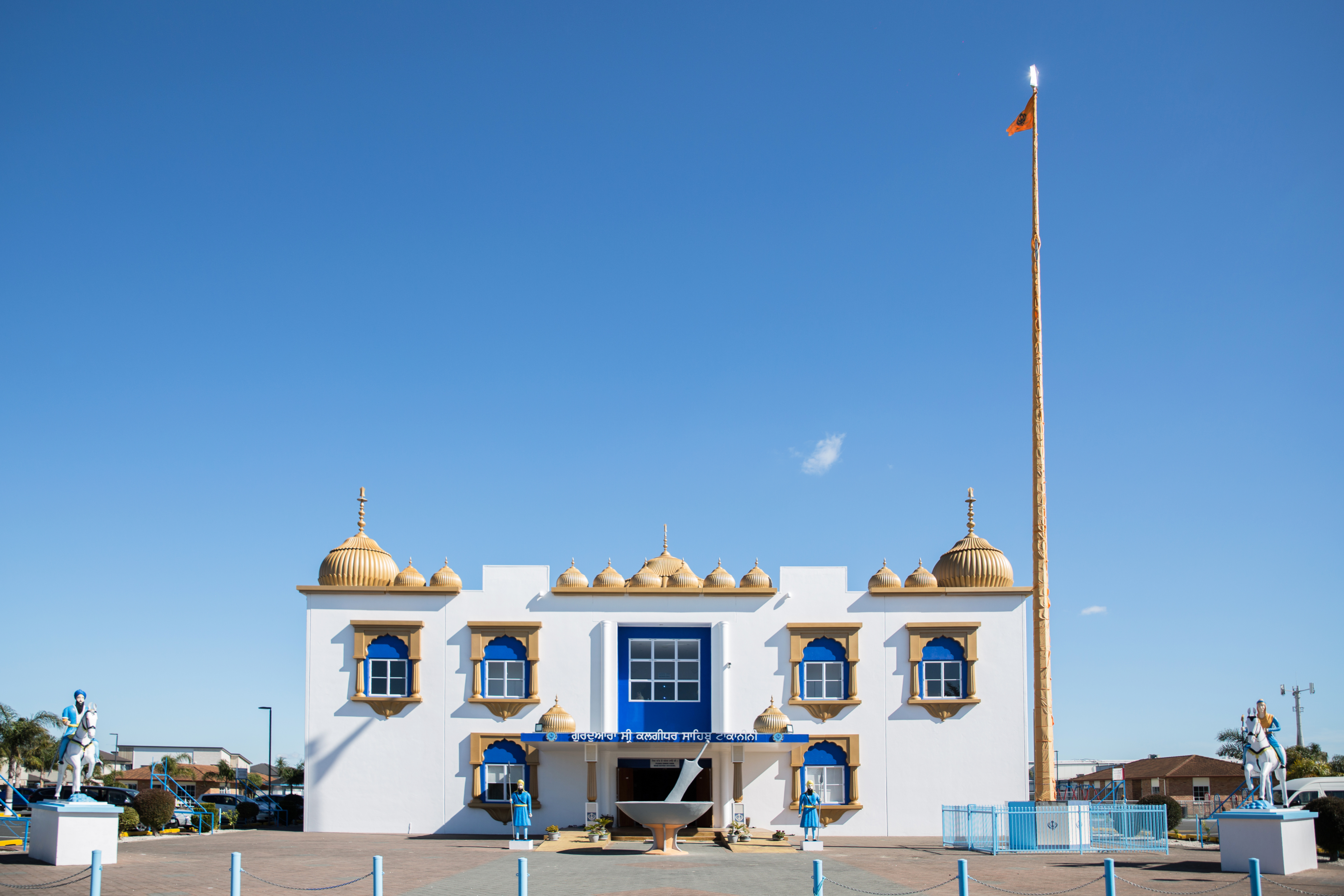
- Gurdwara Sri Kalgidhar Sahib in Takanini, Auckland Region

Total population
- 53,406; 1.07% of the total New Zealander population (2023)

Languages
- New Zealand English • Punjabi • Māori

Related ethnic groups
- American Sikhs; Australian Sikhs; British Sikhs Canadian Sikhs

Historical population
Year	Pop.	±%
1991	2,061	—
1996	2,817	+36.7%
2001	5,199	+84.6%
2006	9,507	+82.9%
2013	19,191	+101.9%
2018	40,908	+113.2%
2023	53,406	+30.6%

New Zealander Sikhs number over 53,000 people and account for 1.1% of New Zealand's population as of 2023, forming the country's fastest-growing and fifth-largest religious group. New Zealand has the world's third-highest Sikh proportion behind Canada (2.1%) and India (1.7%). While there are Sikhs in all sixteen regions of New Zealand, over half of Sikhs lived in Auckland Region in 2018.

The first Sikhs arrived in New Zealand in 1890, but the Immigration Act of 1899 prevented any large-scale migration. In 1987, racial exclusion was scrapped and a race-neutral, points-based immigration system was introduced; by 1991 there were 2,061 Sikhs in New Zealand. Between 2013 and 2018, the number of Sikhs grew by 113% from 19,191 to 40,908, making Sikhism the fastest-growing religion and on pace to eclipse Islam and Buddhism by 2023 at the time. However, the crackdown on student visas and low-skilled workers starting in 2017 stifled Sikh population growth. Between 2018 and 2023, the New Zealander Sikh population grew by 31%, failing to eclipse Islam and Buddhism although remaining the fastest-growing religion.

== History ==
Small numbers of Sikh immigrants from Punjab settled in New Zealand from the late 1800s. Large-scale Sikh immigration began after changes to immigration policies in the 1980s. The New Zealand Sikh Society was established in 1964 and first Sikh Gurdwara opened in 1977.

=== Sikh communities ===
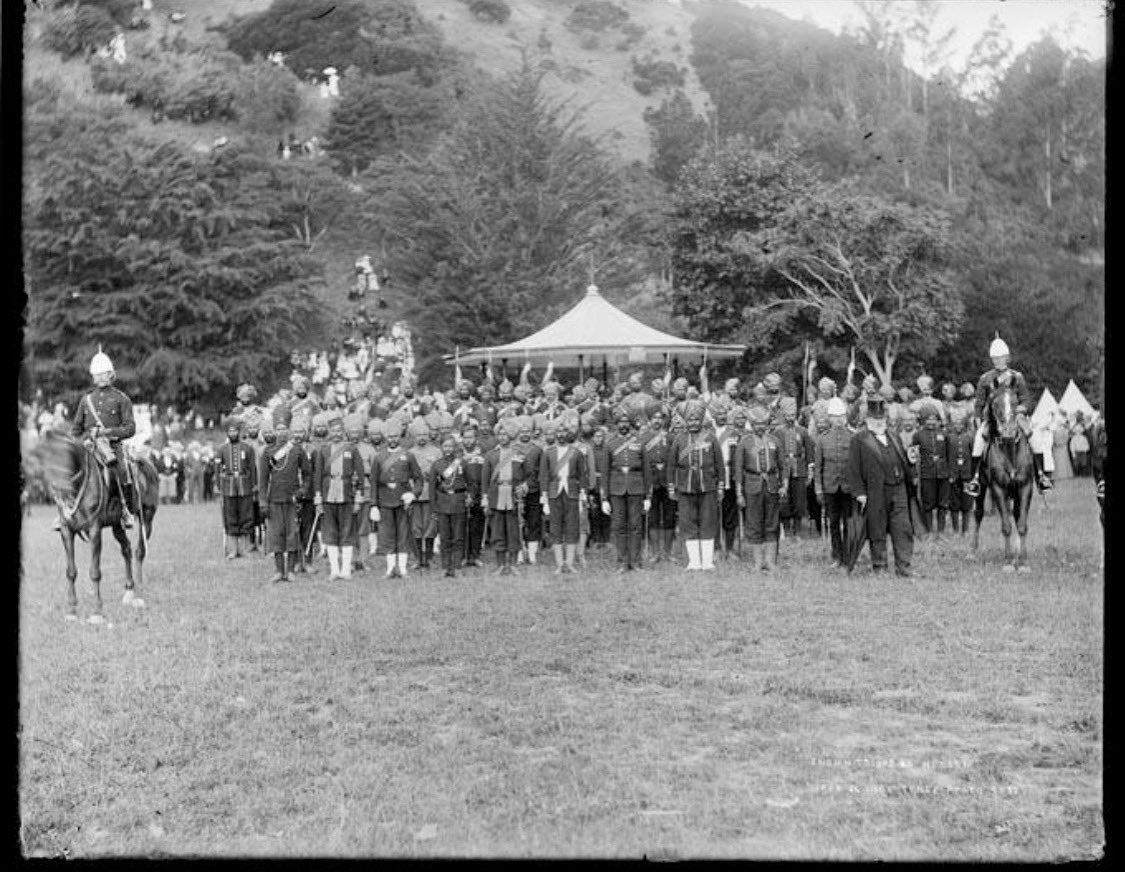
Photograph of Indian troops (including Sikhs) in Nelson, New Zealand, ca.1901. Nelson Provincial Museum.

The first identifiable Sikhs to arrive in New Zealand were two brothers - Phuman Singh and Bir Singh Gill from the Moga district of Punjab. Bir Singh was a herbalist who married and lived amongst the Māori on the North Island. A small wave of Sikhs arrived in New Zealand between 1890 and 1910; mostly immigrants from Punjab. Most Sikhs settled in Waikato, Auckland, Wellington, or Christchurch.

There is a significant history of many Sikhs being dairy farmers throughout New Zealand, many of them being great pioneers. The majority are in the Waikato region and have been there for many generations. Much hard work was undertaken in terms of clearing scrub and tea trees to convert to farmland in the early years. Embracing the Māori culture was also an important aspect. Many of these farmers are well respected within and outside the community for the significant contribution they have made.

With the Sikh community in New Zealand increasing, the New Zealand Sikh Society was developed in 1964, and the first gurdwara was built in Hamilton in 1977 and another in 1986 in Ōtāhuhu. With the increasing number of Sikhs in New Zealand, an increasing number of gurdwaras have been established across the country.

The number of people affiliating with the Sikh religion more than quadrupled since 2006. Papatoetoe in Auckland is considered to be the area with the most Sikhs in New Zealand and it has three Sikh Gurudwaras in the suburb.

== Demographics ==
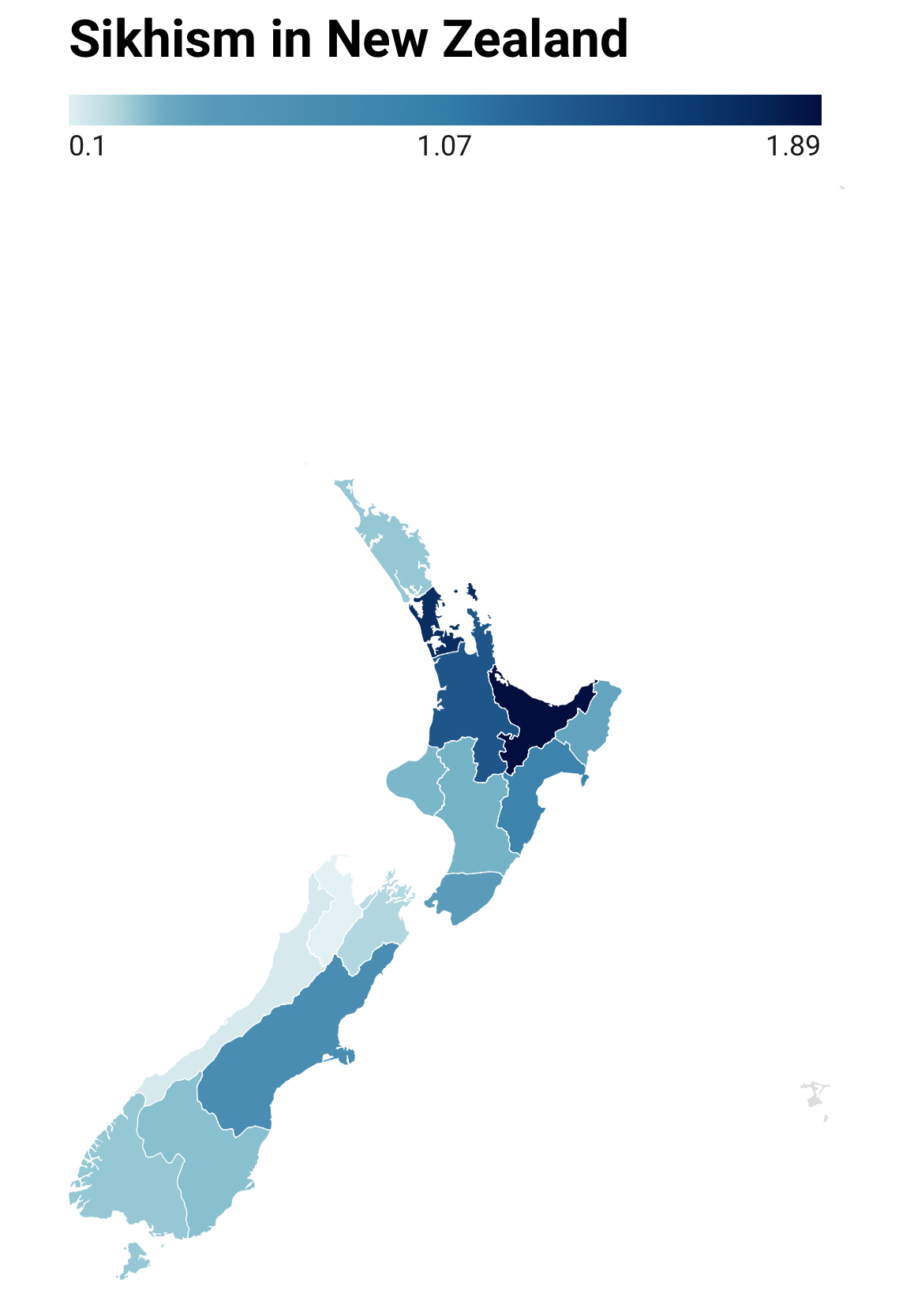
Geographical Distribution of Sikhs in New Zealand as per 2023 Census

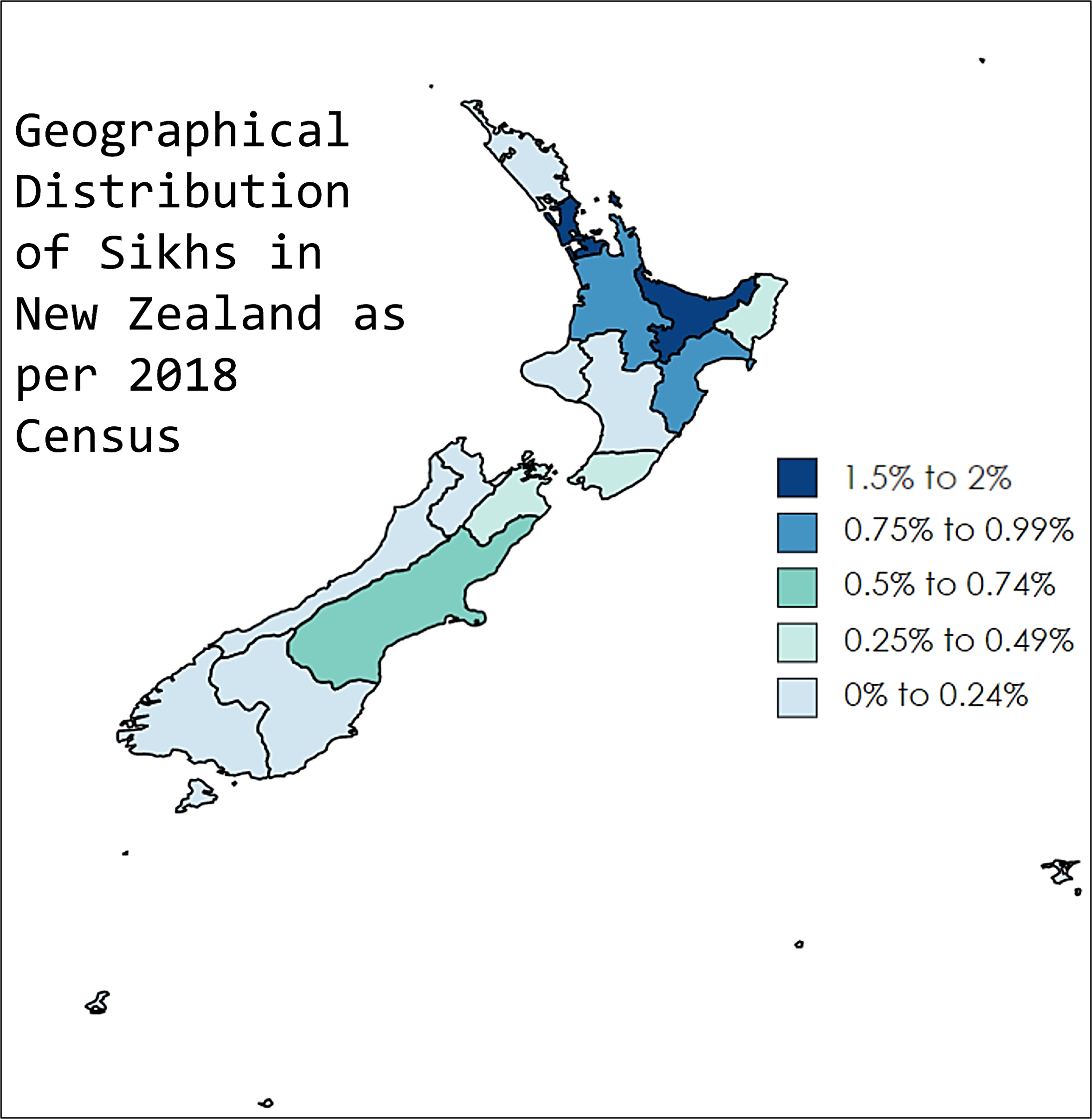
Geographical Distribution of Sikhs in New Zealand as per 2018 Census

Sikh New Zealanders by Region (2013–2023)
Region	2023		2018		2013	
Region	Pop.	%	Pop.	%	Pop.	%
Auckland	28,401	1.71%	23,832	1.52%	11,712	0.83%
Waikato	6,795	1.36%	4,074	0.89%	1,875	0.46%
Bay of Plenty	6,324	1.89%	4,842	1.57%	2,748	1.03%
Canterbury	4,842	0.74%	2,973	0.5%	621	0.12%
Wellington	2,370	0.45%	1,647	0.32%	612	0.13%
Hawke's Bay	1,650	0.94%	1,347	0.81%	783	0.52%
Manawatū-Whanganui	789	0.31%	447	0.19%	246	0.11%
Otago	621	0.26%	510	0.23%	117	0.06%
Northland	480	0.25%	315	0.18%	72	0.05%
Taranaki	357	0.28%	234	0.2%	102	0.09%
Southland	255	0.25%	210	0.22%	60	0.06%
Gisborne	198	0.39%	171	0.36%	84	0.19%
Marlborough	108	0.22%	123	0.26%	51	0.12%
Nelson	105	0.2%	102	0.2%	39	0.08%
Tasman	60	0.1%	51	0.1%	42	0.09%
West Coast	45	0.13%	33	0.1%	24	0.07%
New Zealand	53,406	1.07%	40,908	0.87%	19,191	0.45%

== Gurdwaras ==
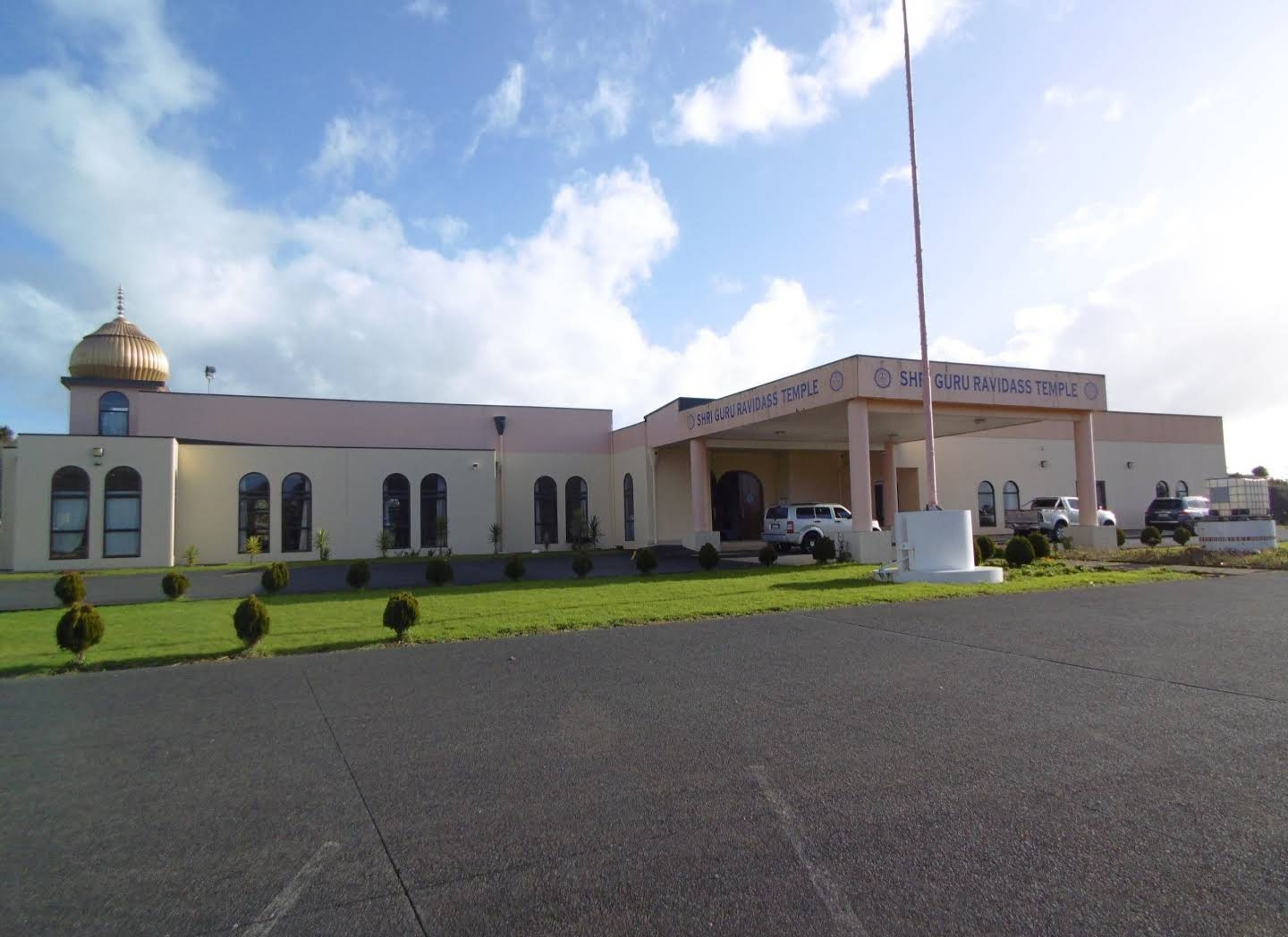
Gurdwara Guru Ravidass Temple, Auckland

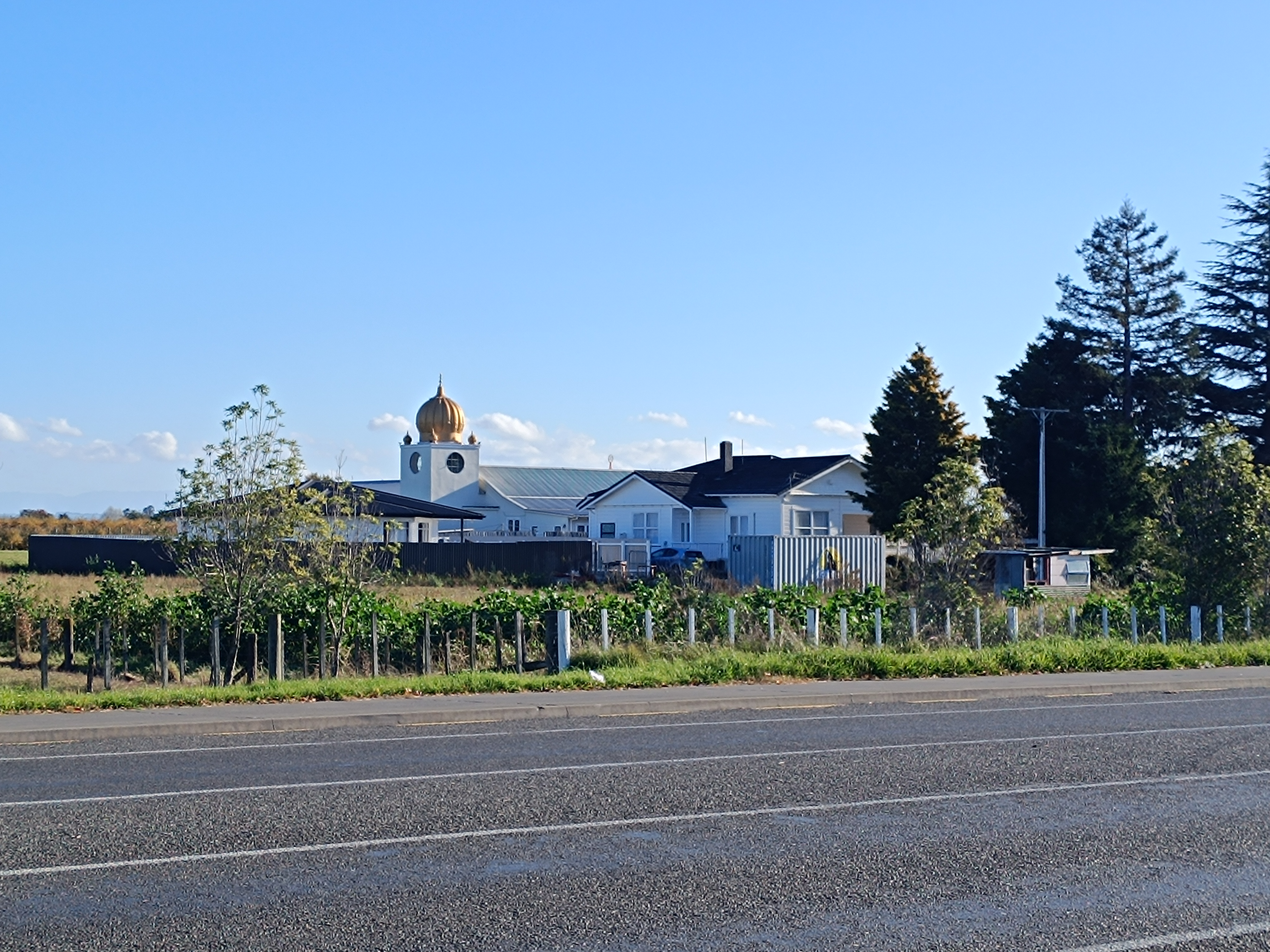
Shri Guru Ravidass Temple, Hastings

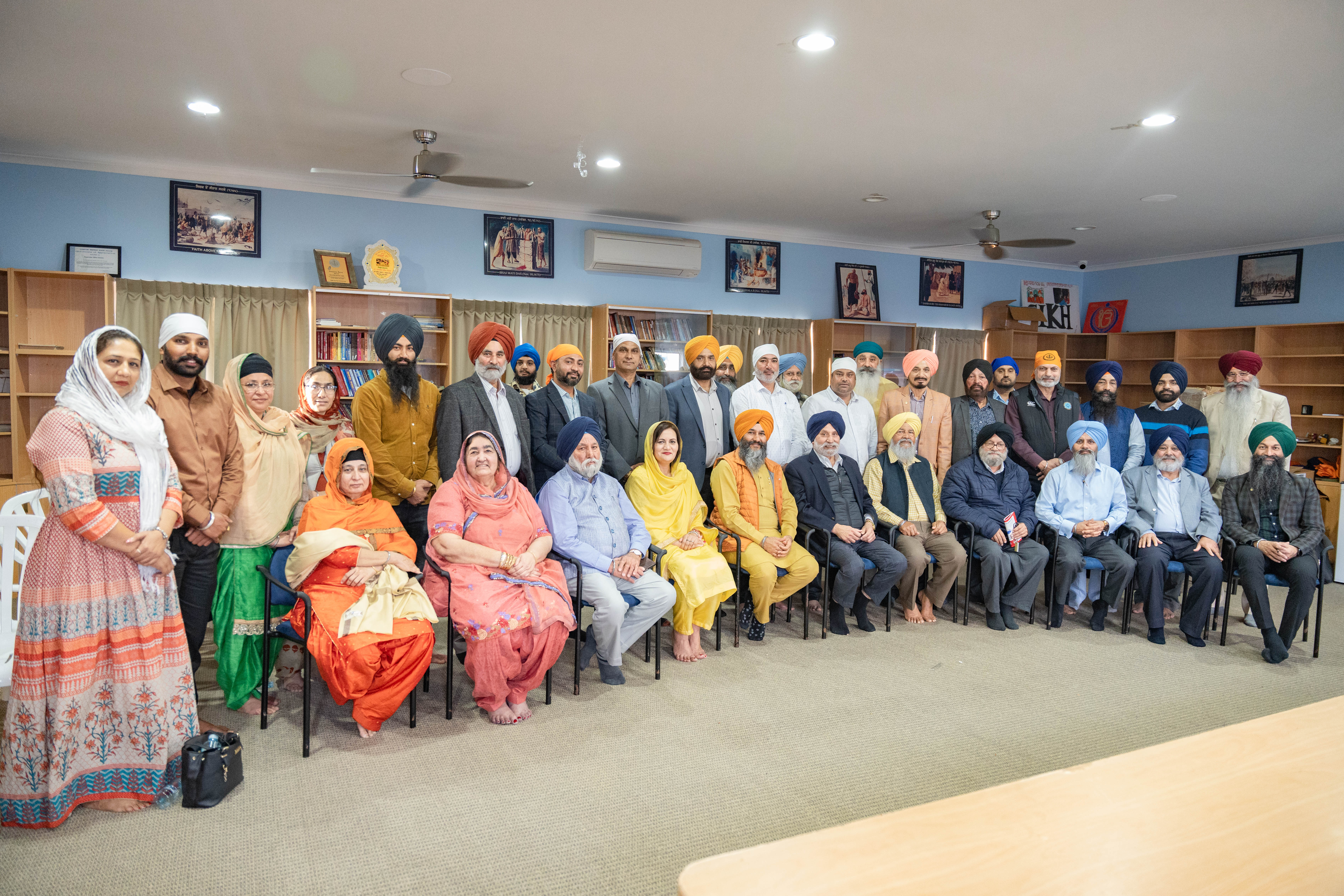
The first general meeting of the New Zealand Central Sikh Association on 18 September 2022 in Takanini.

The New Zealand Central Sikh Association, a centralised representative Sikh body comprising 25 Gurdwaras and various other organisation from across New Zealand was officially formed on 18 September 2022 at the Sikh Library in Takanini.

This is a list of Gurdwaras in New Zealand.

Name	Location	Region
Begampura Gurdwara	1/9 Vernon St, Papakura 2110	Auckland
Gurdwara Dukh Niwaran Sahib Papakura	7/46 Broadway, Papakura 2110	Auckland
Gurdwara Jagat Guru Nanak Sahib	29 Kilmarnock St, Riccarton, Christchurch 8011	Canterbury
Gurdwara Mata Sahib Kaur	23 Bryant Rd, Te Rapa, Hamilton 3200	Waikato
Gurdwara Shri Fateh Sahib	Botanical Rd, West End, Palmerston North 4412	Manawatu-Wanganui
Gurdwara Shri Guru Ravidass Temple Hastings	193 Havelock Nth Road, Hastings	Hawke's Bay
Gurdwara Sikh Sangat Tauranga	43 Burrows St, Tauranga South, Tauranga 3112	Bay of Plenty
Gurdwara Singh Sabha Christchurch	537 Ferry Rd, Woolston, Christchurch 8023	Canterbury
Gurdwara Sri Dasmesh Darbar	158 Kolmar Rd, Papatoetoe 2025	Auckland
Gurdwara Sri Guru Amardas Sahib Ji	24 Ward Ave, Fenton Park, Rotorua 3010	Bay of Plenty
Gurdwara Sri Guru Hargobind Sahib Patshahi 6	84 Lady Ruby Dr, Dannemora 2013	Auckland
Gurdwara Sri Guru Harkrishan Sahib	3034 Great North Rd, New Lynn 0600	Auckland
Gurdwara Sri Guru Nanak Dev Ji Otahuhu	120 Princes St, Otahuhu 1062	Auckland
Gurdwara Sri Guru Ravidas Temple	1998 Great S Rd, Bombay 2675	Auckland
Gurdwara Sri Guru Teg Bahadur Ji	24 Dunnotar Rd, Papatoetoe 2025	Auckland
Gurdwara Sri Kalgidhar Sahib Takanini	70 Takanini School Rd, Takanini 2112	Auckland
Gurdwara Sri Kalgidhar Sahib Tauranga	322 Cheyne Rd, Pyes Pa 3112	Bay of Plenty
Hastings Gurdwara	402 Eastbourne St E, Hastings 4122	Hawke's Bay
Linwood Gurdwara	692 Gloucester St, Linwood, Christchurch 8062	Canterbury
Nanaksar Thath Isher Darbar	100 Great South Rd, Manurewa 2102	Auckland
New Zealand Sikh Society Hamilton	6391 Te Rapa Rd, Horotiu 3288	Waikato
North Shore Gurdwara	128 Sunnybrae Rd, Hillcrest 0627	Auckland
Palmerston North Gurdwara	7 Amesbury St, Palmerston North 4410	Manawatu-Wanganui
Sri Guru Singh Sabha	127 Shirley Rd, Papatoetoe 2025	Auckland
Wellington Gurudwara	4-10 Vogel St, Naenae, Lower Hutt 5011	Wellington
Whangarei Gurudwara Sahib	23 Water St, Whangarei 0110	Northland

== Notable Sikhs ==
- Ish Sodhi – Cricketer for New Zealand National Team
- Kanwal Singh Bakshi – Former National Party MP
- Parmjeet Parmar - ACT MP
- Sukhi Turner – Former mayor of Dunedin
- Bhupinder Singh - Former Cricketer for Auckland cricket team
- Amandeep Singh - Former Cricketer for Canterbury Wizards
- Phomen Singh- Early Sikh migrant to New Zealand (circa 1890)
- Jagt Singh- WWI soldier for New Zealand Army

== See also ==
- Religion in New Zealand
- New Zealand Sikh Games
- Sikh diaspora
- Sikhism by country
- Punjabi New Zealanders
