= Hinduism in New Zealand =

New Zealander Hindus
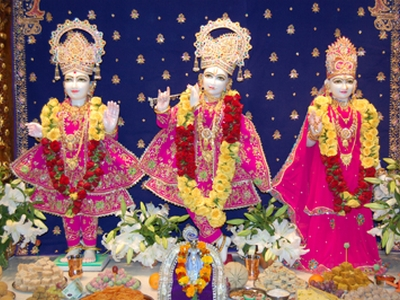
- Idols of Radha Krishna inside the Shri Swaminarayan Mandir, Auckland

Total population
- 144,771 (2023) ▲2.9% of the New Zealand Population

Regions with significant populations
- Auckland · Wellington · Hamilton · Tauranga

Languages
- English · Bhojpuri · Hindi · Punjabi · Tamil · Gujarati · Marathi · Malayalam · Telugu · Bengali · Fiji Hindi · Indian languages

Hinduism is the second largest religion in New Zealand. According to the 2023 census, Hindus form 2.9% of the population of New Zealand. The census counted 144,771 Hindus.

Until the 1980s most Hindu migrants came from Gujarat. Later migrants came from across India and from countries including Sri Lanka, Malaysia and South Africa. Te Ara attributes much of the growth after 1996 to changes in immigration policy and to political unrest in Fiji, which brought Indo-Fijians to New Zealand.

== History ==
=== Early settlement ===
In 1836 the missionary William Colenso saw Māori women near Whangārei using a broken bronze bell to boil potatoes. The inscription is in very old Tamil script. This discovery has led to speculation that Tamil-speaking Hindus may have visited New Zealand hundreds of years ago.

However, the first noted settlement of Hindus in New Zealand dates back to the arrival of sepoys (Indian soldiers) in the 19th century, with the first communities from the Punjab and Gujarat arriving in the 1890s. Until the 1980s almost all Hindu migrants came from Gujarat. Later they arrived from all over India and from elsewhere, including Sri Lanka, Malaysia and South Africa.

=== Easing of immigration policies and increased immigration: 1987-2001 ===
In the 1991 Census, surging migration as a result of the Immigration Act 1987 made the number of Hindus to surpass 17,000. The 1996 New Zealand Census showed the eased immigration laws resulted in the number of Hindus growing from 18,000 in 1991 to surpassing 25,000 for the first time.

=== Fast growth and slowdown: 2001-2012 ===
The 2001 census counted almost 40,000 Hindus, more than double the 1991 figure. The 2006 census showed the number of Hindus to be 64,557, an increase of nearly 62% from the previous census in 2001. Growth was slower between the 2006 and 2013 censuses. The census planned for March 2011 was cancelled after the 2011 Christchurch earthquake. The number of students from India rose over the same period. The 2013 census counted 90,018 Hindus, about 2.1% of the population.

== Demographics ==
Historical growth of the Hindu population in New Zealand
Year	Pop.	±% p.a.
1966	3,599	—
1971	3,845	+1.33%
1976	5,203	+6.24%
1981	6,078	+3.16%
1986	8,148	+6.04%
1991	17,661	+16.73%
1996	25,293	+7.45%
2001	39,627	+9.40%
2006	64,557	+10.25%
2013	90,018	+4.86%
2018	123,534	+6.53%
2023	144,771	+3.22%
^Percentages show the average annual growth rates.^^From 1916-1966, Hindus were counted as "race aliens"^^^2011 Census was delayed due to the Christchurch earthquake.

Hindus In Percentage By Years :

Year	Percent	Increase
1966	0.13%	-
1971	0.13%	+0.00%
1976	0.17%	+0.04%
1981	0.19%	+0.02%
1986	0.25%	+0.06%
1991	0.54%	+0.29%
1996	0.71%	+0.17%
2001	1.02%	+0.31%
2006	1.51%	+0.49%
2013	2.12%	+0.61%
2018	2.65%	+0.53%
2023	2.9%	+0.25%

=== Religion data by years ===
	2018		2013		2006		2001		1996		1991	
	Numbers	%	Number	%	Number	%	Number	%	Number	%	Number	%
Christian	1,738,638	37.31	1,858,977	47.65	2,027,418	54.16	2,043,843	58.92	2,298,793	63.5	2,621,824	77.7
Hinduism	123,534	2.65	90,018	2.12	64,560	1.51	39,864	1.02	25,551	0.71	18,036	0.54
Māori religions, beliefs and philosophies	62,634	1.34	52,947	1.36	65,550	1.75	63,597	1.83	23,325	0.6	No data	No data
Muslim	61,455	1.32	46,194	1.04	36,153	0.84	23,637	0.60	13,545	0.37	6,096	0.18
Buddhist	52,779	1.13	58,440	1.31	52,392	1.22	41,661	1.06	28,131	0.78	12,762	0.38
Sikh	40,908	0.88	19,191	0.43	9,507	0.22	5,199	0.13	2,817	0.08	2,061	0.06
Other religions	42,615	0.91	40,365	0.91	42,012	0.99	36,318	0.94	21,957	0.60	26,133	0.78
No religion/Object/Not stated total	2,577,396	55.3	2,155,722	50.82	1,832,688	45.50	1,554,669	41.60	1,336,854	36.95	980,079	29.05
Total population	4,699,755		4,242,048		4,027,947		3,737,277		3,618,303		3,373,926	

== Classification and ethnicity ==
According to the 2018 census:

- 121,644 identified as Hindu (not further defined)
- 645 Hare Krishnas
- 327 Yoga
- 36 Arya Samaj
- 882 Hindu (not elsewhere classified).

=== Ethnicity ===
Ethnicity
Ethnicity	Percent
Asian	92.19%
European	4%
Pacific peoples	2%
Māori	1%
Others	0.81%

The majority of Hindus in New Zealand are Asians, followed by Europeans and Pacific Islanders. There are 3,567 European and 1,857 Pacific peoples following Hinduism. Hinduism also has a small following among Māori. There are 858 Māori following Hinduism.

== Hindu organisations ==
The first Hindu organisation - the Hindu Council of New Zealand (HCNZ) was formed in the mid-1990s and is affiliated to the Vishwa Hindu Parishad, a global Hindu organisation. HCNZ has hosted annual New Zealand Hindu conferences since 2007. It has also established the Hindu Heritage Centre, Hindu Social Service Foundation, Hindu Elders Foundation and Hindu Youth New Zealand, and runs youth and family camps. In 2010 HCNZ launched Hindu Organisations, Temples and Associations (HOTA), a representative body for Hindu groups in New Zealand.

Other Hindu organisations include Ramakrishna Mission, ISKCON, Chinmaya Mission, Sathya Sai Organisation, Art of Living Foundation, Hindu Swayamsevak Sangh, Hindu Foundation, Sewa International and Ekal Vidyalaya Foundation.

== Contemporary society ==
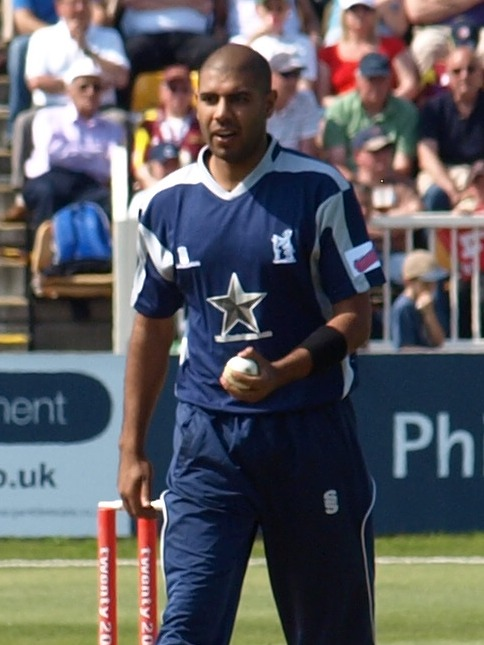
Jeetan Patel, New Zealand Hindu cricketer

A 2019 survey of 1,000 New Zealanders by the Institute for Governance and Policy Studies at Victoria University of Wellington found that 28.3% had complete or a lot of trust in Hindus and 19.9% had little or no trust.

The New Zealand Herald reported in 2015 that Jews and Hindus had the highest level of education, with almost a third holding tertiary qualifications.

=== Hindutva activism and intracommunal tensions ===
During the 2020s, Hindutva activism within the New Zealand Indian diaspora attracted attention from the media and law enforcement authorities. In February 2020, The Spinoff guest writer Shahid S. claimed that Islamophobia was present among Indian diaspora social media pages, with the circulation of posts attacking Muslim immigration and praising the Xinjiang re-education camps that targeted China's predominantly Muslim Uyghur minority. The Bharatiya Janata Party (BJP) government's passage of the Citizenship Amendment Act and the National Register of Citizens for Assam in 2019 also sparked anti-BJP protests in New Zealand which inflamed BJP supporters in New Zealand.

In May 2021, the Massey University communication professor Dr Mohan Dutta published a two-page white paper called Cultural Hindutva and Islamophobia about alleged Islamophobic elements in Hindutva ideology, calling for a careful examining of its presence in New Zealand. Dutta likened the online communication of Hindutva supporters to that of QAnon followers and the far-right Proud Boys. The white paper received a polarising response, with Dutta receiving online abuse and threats from Hindutva supporters. Two Indian community organisations, the New Zealand Hindu Council and the affiliated Hindu Youth Association, and the Indian community website The Indian News accused Dutta and Massey University of promoting "Hinduphobia". By contrast, the Aotearoa Alliance of Progressive Indians (AAPI), NZ Indian Association of Minorities, and Hindus for Human Rights Australia and New Zealand defended Dutta's academic freedom, condemning threats against Dutta, and calling for the New Zealand and Australian governments to monitor Hindutva ideology within the Indian diaspora communities.

In mid-September 2021, Dutta also participated in a controversial international online academic conference called "Dismantling Hindutva," which was co-sponsored by Massey University and 70 other academic institutions. Dr Sapna Samant of the left-wing advocacy group Aotearoa Alliance of Progressive Indians (AAPI) also claimed that local Hindutva supporters were intimidating her and Dutta. In late September, the New Zealand Police confirmed that they were investigating online threats against Dutta and had put a safety plan in place.

== Relation with Māori ==
There are similarities between Hindu and Māori people customs and languages. There are at least 185 Sanskrit and other Indian language words similar to the Māori language. Some Hindu communities also have similar buildings to marae, where people hold meetings and sleep over. Māori also bless new buildings before they open, usually before sunrise, as Hindus do.

== Temples ==
The following is a list of Hindu temples in New Zealand, grouped by city.

=== Auckland ===
- Shri Ram Mandir, Henderson
- Thiru Subramaniyar Aalayam, Māngere, a South Indian style temple
- Bhartiya Mandir, Balmoral, described by the Indian Weekender in 2017 as the oldest and largest Hindu temple in New Zealand
- Thirumurugan Temple in Otahuhu.
- Sri Ganesh Temple located in Papakura.
- Radha-Krishna Temple in Eden Terrace
- Ram Krishna Temple in Papatoetoe
- Swaminarayan Temple in Auckland, situated in Papatoetoe and run by The International Swaminarayan Satsang Organisation
- BAPS Shri Swaminarayan Mandir, Avondale, Auckland.

=== Wellington ===
- Kurinchi Kumaran Temple, located in Wellington in Newlands. It was the first South Indian style Hindu temple in New Zealand.
- The Wellington Indian Association run a North Indian style Temple.
- Sri Venkateswara Swamy Temple of Wellington is located in Wainuiomata. It is run by the Sanatana Dharma Paripalana Seva Trust New Zealand, a charity registered in 2018.
- BAPS Shri Swaminarayan Mandir, 83A Eastern Hutt Road, Taita, Lower Hutt

=== Tauranga ===
- Sanatan Dharam Mandir, built by the members of the Tauranga Hindu community. The trust bought roughly 2150 square meters of land in the suburb of Tauriko for around $400,000. Despite being inaugurated in 2012, work on the actual Hindu Temple did not commence until early 2015. Stage One of the temple was completed by mid-late 2015.

=== Christchurch ===
- BAPS Shri Swaminarayan Mandir, Papanui. The temple was inaugurated after 12 months of renovations, which the 2011 Christchurch earthquake temporarily halted.

=== Rotorua ===
- BAPS Shri Swaminarayan Mandir, Rotorua, opened in 2012. In 2014 the Rotorua Daily Post reported that a new temple being built in the city would be the only Hindu place of worship in the central North Island.

=== Hamilton ===
- The Sri Balaji Temple was opened in March 2015, six years after the founding of the Sri Balaji Temple Charitable Trust
- BAPS Shri Swaminarayan Mandir, 10 Tawn Place, Pukete, Hamilton 3200

=== Other locations ===
- The International Society for Krishna Consciousness also has a presence in New Zealand, running temples in Auckland, Hamilton, Wellington and Christchurch. The Auckland temple is located out of the city, and is built in the Vedic style with a tower over the main shrine.

== Discrimination ==
A West Auckland Hindu temple was the target of an arson attack over Labour weekend. The incident occurred at Shri Ram Mandir on Brick St in Auckland's Henderson on 21 October 2022 at about 11.30 pm. Temple spokesperson Pravin Kumar said, "It could have been disastrous because, on the premises, we also have a priest's quarters where the family of the priest were present - it's attached to the same building, and people could have died."

In July 2023, multiple Hindu temples received anonymous letters with intimidating anti-Hindu messages that denounced idol worship and polytheism and quoted passages from the Quran. Hindu community leaders condemned the letters and called for tolerance between faith communities.

== Notable Hindus ==
=== Sport ===
- Jeetan Patel, former spin bowler for the New Zealand cricket team, the Black Caps
- Roy Krishna, Fijian football player playing for Wellington Phoenix FC as a striker in the A-league
- Dipak Narshibhai Patel, cricket player Tests and one-day internationals for New Zealand
- Jeet Raval, current batsman for the Black Caps Test match team
- Roneel Hira, New Zealand cricketer
- Tarun Nethula, New Zealand cricketer
- Rachin Ravindra, current New Zealand cricketer

=== Entertainment ===
- Aaradhna Patel, Half Samoan and half Indian R&B artist
- Shailesh Prajapati, New Zealand actor, known for his role as Ernie in Power Rangers MegaForce

=== Media ===
- Rohit Kumar Happy, editor of Bharat-Darshan, Hindi literary magazine
- Rebecca Singh, openly lesbian news anchor on the New Zealand television station TV3

=== Politics ===
- Mahesh Bindra, Hindu Member of Parliament
- Priyanca Radhakrishnan, first Hindu woman Member of Parliament since 2017
- Rajen Prasad, former Race Relations Commissioner and Families Commissioner, first Hindu Member of Parliament serving from 2008-2014
- Anand Satyanand, former Governor-General of New Zealand, appointed on 23 August 2006

== See also ==
- Religion in New Zealand
- Hinduism by country
- Little India
- Hinduism in Australia
- Hinduism in South Africa
- Indian New Zealanders
- Non-resident Indian and Person of Indian Origin
- Tamil bell
