= India–New Zealand relations =

- New Zealand: India

Diplomatic mission
- High Commission of New Zealand, New Delhi: High Commission of India, Wellington

Envoy
- New Zealand High Commissioner to India David Pine: Indian High Commissioner to New Zealand Ms Neeta Bhushan

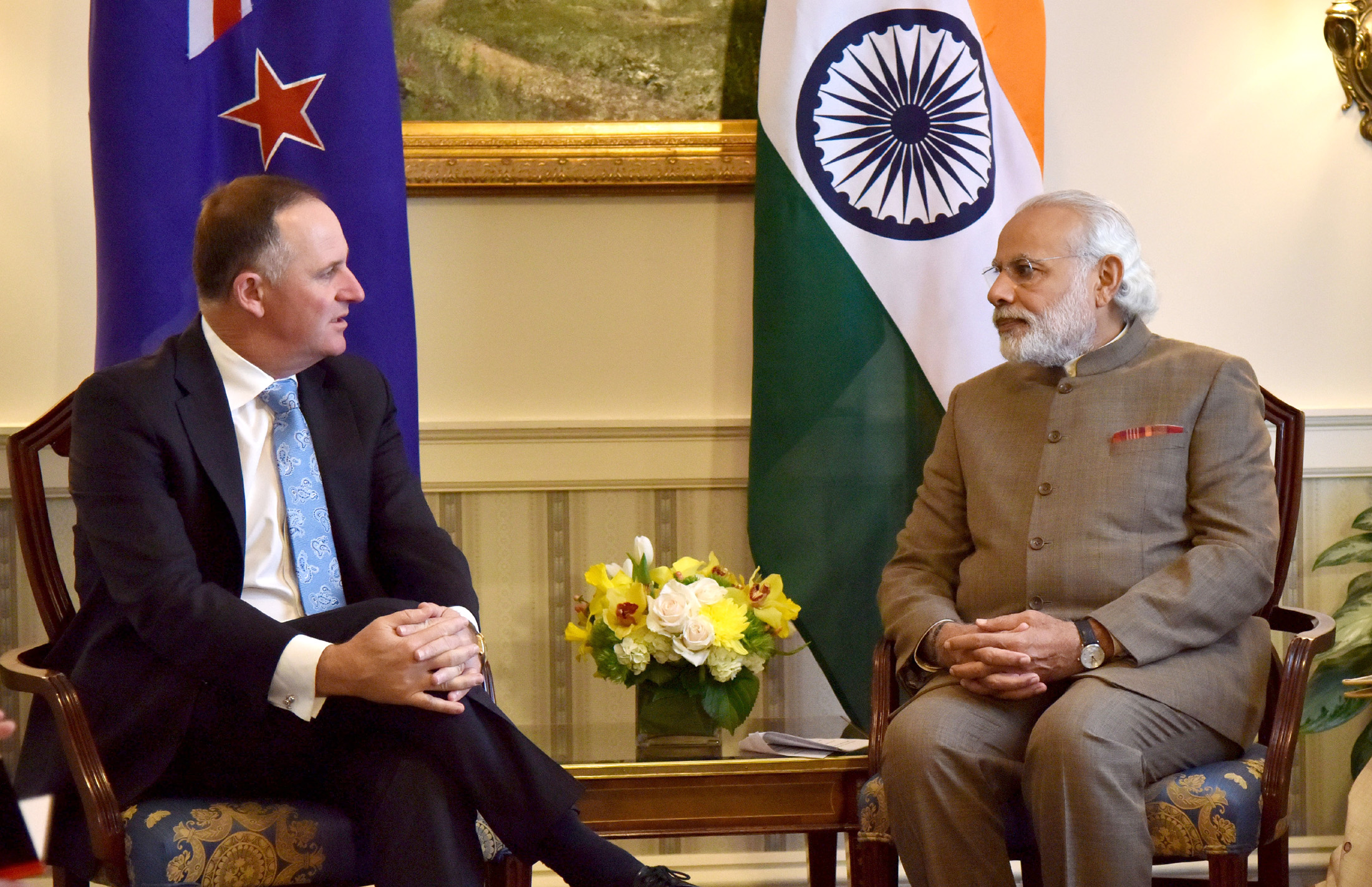
Prime Ministers John Key and Narendra Modi meeting in Washington DC, March 2016.

India–New Zealand relations are the interactions between India and New Zealand. Both countries were once part of the British Empire, are part of the Commonwealth of Nations, and have English as one of their official languages. There are approximately 175,000 people of Indian descent in New Zealand.

== History ==
Bilateral relations were established between India and New Zealand in 1952. India–New Zealand relations were cordial but not extensive after Indian independence. More recently, New Zealand has shown interest in extending ties with India due to India's impressive GDP growth.

The countries set up a Joint Trade Committee in 1983 and have had discussions on a free trade agreement either bilaterally or through the East Asian Summit, but this has not emerged due to disagreements over agricultural subsidies. There is also some educational cooperation, with around 23,000 Indian students studying in New Zealand.

Defence cooperation has been more limited, but there have been joint naval exercises, and Indian and New Zealand troops have served together in United Nations peacekeeping missions in Kosovo and Sudan.

India and New Zealand have a bilateral cyber dialogue. In November 2017, the first India-New Zealand Cyber Dialogue was held in New Delhi. The Indian Delegation was led by Sanjay Kumar Verma, Additional Secretary, Ministry of External Affairs. The New Zealand delegation was led by Paul Ash, Director of the National Cyber Policy Office, Department of Prime Minister and Cabinet. Areas of discussion included domestic cyber policy landscape, cyber threats and mitigation, new technologies, mechanism on bilateral cooperation and possible cooperation at various international fora and regional fora.

In early November 2024, Indian Minister of External Affairs S. Jaishankar raised concerns with New Zealand Foreign Minister Winston Peters about a planned non-binding referendum on Khalistan's independence in Auckland that was organised by the Sikhs for Justice. The Auckland Council and its business subsidiary Tātaki Auckland Unlimited gave approval for the referendum to be held on 17 November, citing people's right to peaceful assembly. On 17 November, the Auckland referendum was attended by thousands.

== Diplomatic representation ==
India has a High Commission in Wellington with a consulate general in Auckland. New Zealand has a High Commission in New Delhi along with a consulate-general in Mumbai.

== Bilateral visits ==
Pranab Mukherjee became the first President of India to visit New Zealand in August 2016. The government of India notified the third protocol between India and New Zealand for avoidance of double taxation and prevention of fiscal evasion with respect to taxes on income.

New Zealand Foreign Minister, Nanaia Mahuta visited India and conducted bilateral talks with Indian Foreign Minister S. Jaishankar. The talks centered around taking the bilateral relationship to the next level, including exploring future economic relationship, cooperation in International Solar Alliance, improved air connectivity and private sector collaboration. She is also promoting New Zealand's education, trade and tourism sector. Indian Foreign Minister S.Jaishankar stated that "A warm and wide ranging conversation with FM Nanaia Mahuta of New Zealand this evening. Discussion covered our expanding ties that is being reflected in increased frequency of our contacts. Shared views on the global situation from our vantage points, including on the Indo-Pacific. Appreciated her perspectives of the region. Welcome New Zealand’s joining the International Solar Alliance.”

Between 15 and 19 March 2025, New Zealand Prime Minister Christopher Luxon and Trade Minister Todd McClay led a trade delegation to India. The New Zealand and Indian governments also agreed to enter into free trade negotiations commencing in April 2025. Luxon also met with Indian Prime Minister Narendra Modi to discuss defence and security cooperation. The two leaders signed a bilateral defence agreement. In addition, Modi raised concerns about so-called "anti-India" activities in New Zealand. During his state visit, Luxon also visited an Indian Navy warship and HMNZS Te Kaha, which was docking in Mumbai to host a networking event with the Indian Navy.

Between 10-11 July 2026, Modi visited Auckland, marking the first state visit by an Indian Prime Minister to New Zealand in 40 years. Modi arrived on 10 July, where he was greeted by Prime Minister Luxon. On 11 July, Modi met with Luxon for bilateral talks, followed by meetings with prominent New Zealand business and sports figures as well as Labour Party leader Chris Hipkins. Key issues covered during the visit included bilateral defence industry cooperation, the recent bilateral free trade agreement, work and student visa holders.

== Economic relations ==
Bilateral merchandise trade was worth US$1.3 billion in 2024–2025, with total trade in goods and services of US$2.4 billion in 2024. As of April 2026, bilateral trade between India and New Zealand was worth an estimated NZ$3.95 billion.

=== New Zealand–India Free Trade Agreement ===
On 22 December 2025, the Indian and New Zealand governments announced plans to sign a free trade agreement in 2026. The agreement would eliminate tariffs on 95% of New Zealand exports to India including kiwifruits, apples, meat, wool, coal, and forestry. While certain New Zealand dairy exports such as re-exports and bulk infant formula will be duty-free, most dairy products will still be subject to tariffs. Milk albumins will be subject to a 50 percent tariff cut under a quota programme. In return, New Zealand will eliminate duties on all Indian exports, including textiles, apparel, leather, footwear, marine products, gems and jewelry, handicrafts, engineering goods and automobiles. In addition, New Zealand will invest US$20 billion in India over the next twenty years and improve visa access for Indian professionals, skilled workers and students.

Several New Zealand agricultural and industrial bodies, including Export NZ, the NZ Forest Owners Association, the Meat Industry Association, Beef + Lamb New Zealand, Horticulture New Zealand, NZ Timber Industry Federation, and Wools of New Zealand, welcomed the free trade agreement. The Dairy Companies Association expressed disappointment that core products such as butter and cheese had been excluded from the agreement. New Zealand First leader Winston Peters opposed the agreement on the grounds that it disadvantaged New Zealand's dairy industry and boosted Indian immigration to New Zealand. Peters invoked the party's "agree to disagree" provision of its coalition agreement with the National-led coalition government. In late April 2026, Labour Party leader Chris Hipkins confirmed that his party would support legislation enabling the agreement, giving the National and ACT parties the votes in Parliament needed, given that New Zealand First would vote against it.

The free trade agreement was signed by NZ Trade and Investment Minister Todd McClay and Indian Commerce and Industry Minister Piyush Goyal in New Delhi on 27 April 2026. New Zealand Prime Minister Christopher Luxon also attended the signing ceremony. On 17 September, the New Zealand Parliament passed legislation implementing the free trade agreement with India by a margin of 93 to 29 votes. On 21 September, the two governments formally ratified the New Zealand-India free trade agreement.

== Cultural relations ==
=== Education relations ===
The New Zealand India Research Institute was established in 2012 for research on India and NZ–India relations. Administratively based at Victoria University of Wellington, it initially involved nearly 40 academics in five New Zealand universities – Victoria, Auckland, Massey, Canterbury and Otago. The inaugural meeting of the India-New Zealand Education Council took place when the institute was established. Academics from seven New Zealand universities were later involved.

=== Sporting relations ===
India and New Zealand have a cricketing relationship which has often seen New Zealand win in international knockout matches.

There is also a minor presence of Indian games such as kabaddi and kho kho in New Zealand due to migration and cultural events such as the New Zealand Sikh Games. In November 2026, India–New Zealand centenary hockey series is set to be played to commemorate the 100 years of sporting ties between the two nations.

== See also ==
- Foreign relations of India
- Foreign relations of New Zealand
- Indian New Zealanders
