= Rotuman New Zealanders =

Ethnic group in New Zealand

Pure‘ag Rotuḁm ne Niu Sirḁgi

Total population
- 981 (2018)

Regions with significant populations
- Auckland, Wellington, Hamilton, Napier, Christchurch

Languages
- New Zealand English, Rotuman

Related ethnic groups
- Pasifika New Zealanders, Samoan New Zealanders, Tongan New Zealanders, Fijian New Zealanders, Rotuman Australians

Rotuman New Zealanders are Rotuman immigrants in New Zealand, typically from Rotuma Island or Fiji, their descendants, and New Zealanders of Rotuman ethnic descent. At the time of the 2018 New Zealand census, 981 people in New Zealand were surveyed as being of Rotuman descent.

Since 2018, Gasav Ne Fäeag Rotuạm Ta, or Rotuman Language Week has been celebrated in New Zealand. From 2020, the New Zealand Government has officially celebrated this as a Pacific Language Week.

== History ==
The first known Rotuman who lived in New Zealand was Saturday, a Cook Strait whaler who worked for Dicky Barrett in the 1840s. In the mid-19th century, labourers were recruited from to Rotuma to work in the Pacific, however this stopped in 1881 when Rotuma became a part of the British Colony of Fiji, and all sea traffic was routed between Rotuma and Fiji. Rotuman labourers often could not contact their homelands, and many Rotuman labourers immigrated to New Zealand during this period.

The modern Rotuman community developed after a wave of immigration beginning in the 1950s. The Royal New Zealand Air Force had a major presence in Suva during the 1950s and 1960s. Many Rotuman women married New Zealand air personnel and immigrated to New Zealand. Rotuman diaspora communities developed in Auckland, Napier and Wellington, and immigration to New Zealand peaked in the 1970s and 1980s. Between 1977 and 1978, the Auckland-based Pasifika community magazine Mana ran a regular community news column written in Fäeg Rotuḁm (the Rotuman language), written by Joseph T. Eason. During this period, many Rotumans in New Zealand tended to describe themselves as Fijian or Polynesian. Methodist minister Jione Langi established the Rotuman New Zealand Fellowship in the early 1990s, after attempts in the 1970s and 1980s to create an organised society for Rotumans in New Zealand.

In 2011, film-maker and musician Ngaire Fuata produced the film Salat Se Rotuma - Passage to Rotuma for Tagata Pasifika, documenting her return to Rotuma island. In 2016, the Pacific Collections Access Project (PCAP) at Auckland War Memorial Museum worked with the Rotuman New Zealand community to properly label Rotuman cultural artefacts, as many had been labelled more broadly as Fijian cultural artefacts.

In the late 2010s, the Rotuman language was classified as an endangered language by UNESCO, leading to a greater focus on supporting the Rotuman language in the Rotuman New Zealand community. The first Rotuman Language Week was organised by the Auckland Rotuman Fellowship Group in 2018. In 2018 and 2019, the Auckland Rotuman Fellowship Group lobbied the Ministry for Pacific Peoples to recognise the week nationally. After appealing to the Human Rights Commission in 2019, the week was officially added to the New Zealand Government's Pacific Language Week calendar in 2020.

A number of Rotuman organisations exist in New Zealand, including the Hata Collective, the Auckland Rotuman Fellowship Group, the New Zealand Rotuman Fellowship Inc (NZRF) and the New Zealand Rotuman Community Centre, located in Papatoetoe, South Auckland. Traditional cultural aspects of the Rotuman community in New Zealand include Rotuma Day celebrations, ‘ai peluag (traditional wooden club) carving and ‘foh kava (kava ceremonies) with fakpeje and mạnu‘ (traditional chanting and exclamations).

== Demographics ==
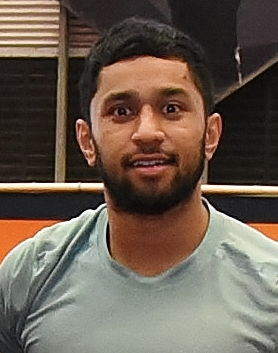
New Zealand national rugby sevens team player Rocky Khan

There were 981 people identifying as being Rotuman at the 2018 New Zealand census, making up 0.003% of the Pasifika New Zealander population, and 0.0002% of New Zealand's general population. This is an increase of 198 people since the 2013 census, and an increase of 360 people since the 2006 census. Some of the increase between the 2013 and 2018 census was due to Statistics New Zealand adding ethnicity data from other sources (previous censuses, administrative data, and imputation) to the 2018 census data to reduce the number of non-responses. The New Zealand Rotuman population is approximately half the number of people living on Rotuman island, and one-tenth of the number who live on Fiji.

There were 453 males and 525 females, giving a sex ratio of 0.863 males per female. The median age was 26.5 years, compared to 37.4 years for all New Zealanders. In terms of population distribution, 61.8% Pacific people live in the Auckland region, while 11% live in the Wellington Region and 8.5% in the Waikato Region.

== Notable Rotuman New Zealanders ==
- Rachael Mario
- David Eggleton
- Ngaire Fuata
- Jono Gibbes
- Rocky Khan
- Isa Nacewa
- Campese Ma'afu
- Sofia Tekela-Smith
- Caleb Clarke (rugby union) - maternal side
