= Rotuman Australians =

Ethnic group in New Zealand

Pure‘ag Rotuḁm ne Australia

Total population
- 1000-2000

Regions with significant populations
- Sydney, Brisbane, Torres Islands

Languages
- Australian English, Rotuman

Related ethnic groups
- Rotuman New Zealanders, Fijian Australian

Rotuman Australians are Rotuman immigrants in Australia, typically from Rotuma Island or Fiji, their descendants, and Australians of Rotuman ethnic descent. Approximately 1000-2000 Rotumans reside in Australia.

== History ==
In the late 19th century, Rotuman men migrated to the Torres Strait Islands, participating heavily in the pearl-diving industry. Known as skilled sailors, roughly 100–200 Rotumans worked as divers and boatmen, with some settling permanently, marrying local women, and establishing early, though often overlooked, roots in Australia.

This era marked the beginning of Rotuman diaspora connections to Australia, characterized by successful integration into the maritime, and later, broader Australian workforce.

== Notable Rotuman Australians ==
- Greg Fasala (of Rotuman descent on his Father’s side): Australian swimmer and Olympic medalist
- Jaxon Evans: racing driver.
- Lington Ieli: rugby player for the ACT Brumbies
- Matt Leo (of Rotuman descent on his father’s side): Australian-born player for the Philadelphia Eagles in the National Football League (NFL)
- Callum Simpson (Paternal Grandmother) Australian Paralympic medalist
- John Sutton: National Rugby League player
- Rebecca Tavo (has a Rotuman father): Australian touch-rugby player
- Selina Hornibrook (has a Rotuman mother): former Australian netball player
