= Pakistani New Zealanders =

Total population
- 8,094 by birth (2023)

Regions with significant populations
- Auckland, Wellington

Languages
- English (New Zealand English, Pakistani English) · Urdu · Sindhi · Punjabi · Saraiki · Pashto · Balti · Pakistani languages

Religion
- Islam (majority), Christianity, Non Religion (minority)

Related ethnic groups
- Overseas Pakistanis, Indian New Zealanders, Chinese New Zealanders, Afghan New Zealanders, Iranian New Zealanders

Pakistani New Zealanders, also known as Pakistani Kiwis, are New Zealanders of Pakistani descent or Pakistan-born people who have immigrated to New Zealand.

== Demographics ==
Historical population

| Year | Pop. | ±% p.a. |
|---|---|---|
| 1951 | ... | — |
| 1956 | ... | — |
| 1961 | ... | — |
| 1966 | ... | — |
| 1971 | ... | — |
| 1976 | ... | — |
| 1981 | ... | — |
| 1986 | ... | — |

| Year | Pop. | ±% p.a. |
|---|---|---|
| 1991 | ... | — |
| 1996 | ... | — |
| 2001 | ... | — |
| 2006 | ... | — |
| 2013 | 3,261 | — |
| 2018 | 6,135 | +13.47% |
| 2023 | 8,094 | +5.70% |

According to the 2001 census, the population of New Zealanders born in Pakistan or Pakistan-born New Zealand residents was around 3,000. However, since that time, the population of Pakistani Kiwis has been growing at a fair pace across many parts of the country with significant figures in Auckland. In 2007, the population had grown to 5,000. Pakistanis are located in almost all the major cities and towns of New Zealand, including Auckland, Hamilton, Wellington, Christchurch, Tauranga, Otago and Dunedin.

=== Religion ===
Religion
| Religion | Percent |
| Muslim | 88.1% |
| Christian | 4.1% |
| No Religion | 3.6% |
| Hinduism | 0.8% |
| Others | 3.4% |

Most of the Pakistani New Zealanders are Muslims.

== Notable people ==
- Azhar Abbas, Auckland Aces cricketer
- Billy Ibadulla, New Zealand–based former Pakistani cricketer and commentator
- Haroon, English-born Pakistani pop singer of New Zealand origin
- Muhammad Abbas, cricketer

== See also ==
- Punjabi New Zealanders
- New Zealand–Pakistan relations
