= Jasvir Kaur =

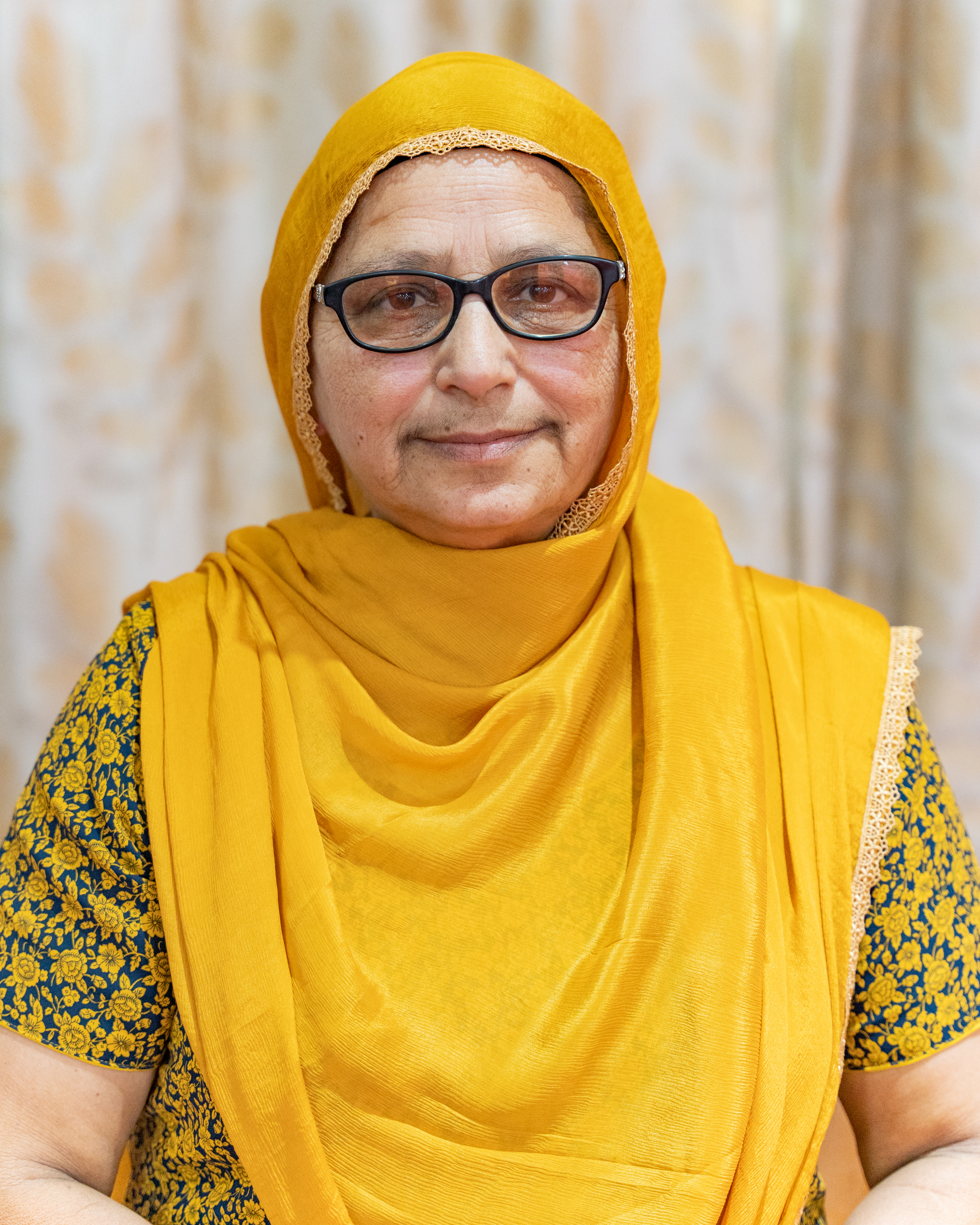
- Kaur in 2022

President of the Supreme Sikh Society of New Zealand
- In office 14 August 2022 – 29 September 2024
- Vice President: Kuldeep Kaur
- Preceded by: Jaswinder Singh Nagra
- Succeeded by: Kartar Singh Dhaliwal

Jasvir Kaur is the former president of the Supreme Sikh Society of New Zealand, having served from 2022 to 2024. She is the mother of former New Zealand cricketer and 2017 New Zealand general election ACT New Zealand candidate, Bhupinder Singh.
