= Rachael Mario =

Rotuman New Zealand community leader

- Citizenship: New Zealand
- Occupation: Activist
- Known for: Rotuman language advocacy
- Board member of: Auckland Rotuman Fellowship Group

Rachael Mario is a Rotuman New Zealand community leader, social worker, and advocate for the Rotuman language. She is Chairperson of the Auckland Rotuman Fellowship Group. She also helped setup the world's first Rotuman Community Centre in 2020, where language and culture is taught and promoted.

Mario is known for her work in protecting and preserving her native indigenous Rotuman language. In 2018, she founded the Rotuman Language Week, a week celebrating the endangered Rotuman language, which is now celebrated in New Zealand and Fiji in May. In 2019 she lodged a complaint with the New Zealand Human Rights Commission against the Ministry for Pacific Peoples alleging discrimination against Rotumans by the failure to recognise their language. Other Rotuman groups accused her of misrepresenting the community. She has also spoken out in support of the issue of Fijian Hindu claims to a Pasifika, rather than an Asian, identity. She contested the 2022 New Zealand local elections, standing for a seat on the Puketāpapa Local Board, as part of the Roskill Community Voice consortium, Mount Roskill, Auckland.
