= Supreme Sikh Society of New Zealand =

Sikh organization in New Zealand

Supreme Sikh Society
- ਸੁਪਰੀਪ ਸਿੱਖ ਸੋਸਾਇਟੀ
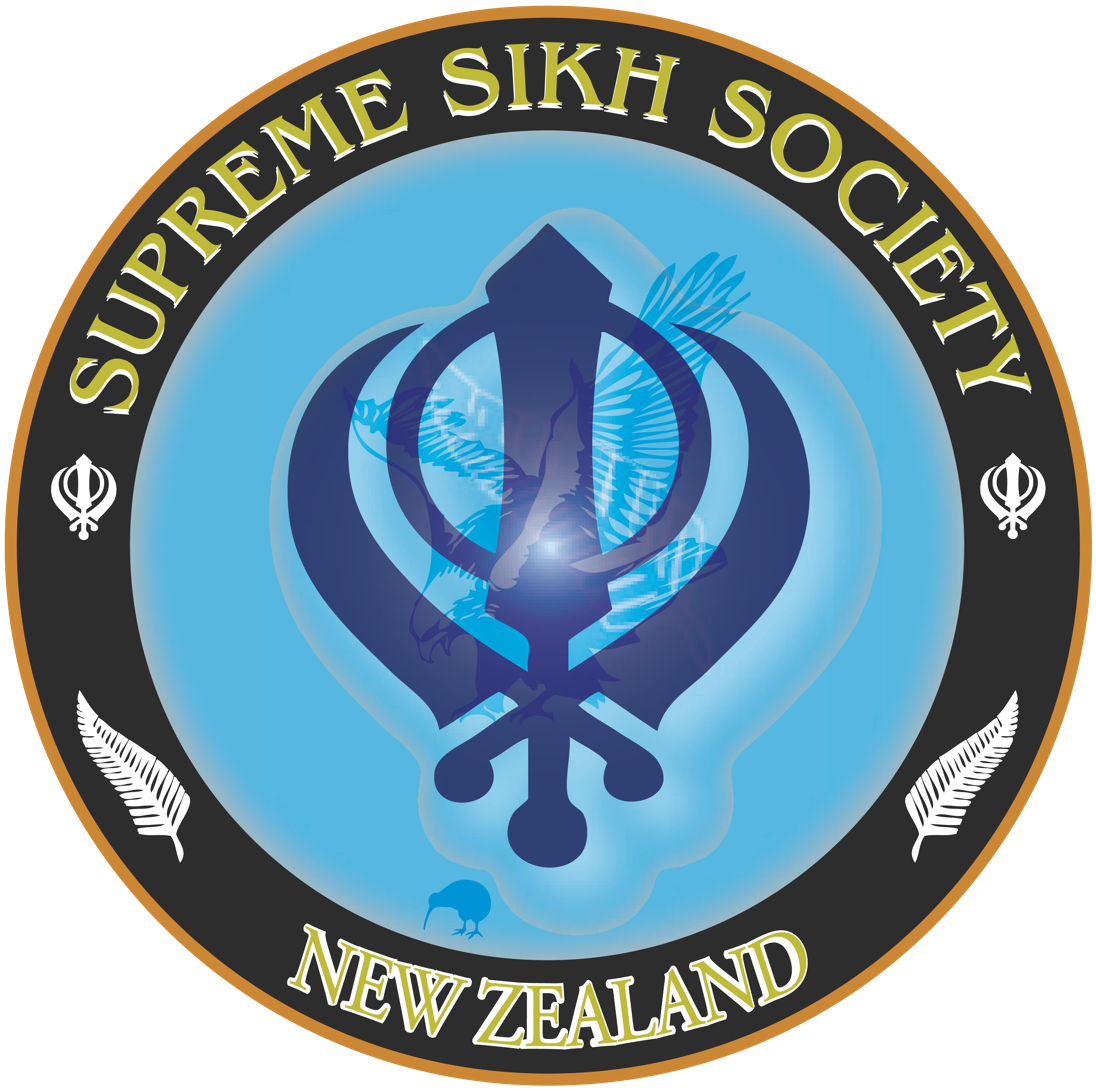
- Official seal
- Abbreviation: SSSNZ
- Formation: 6 June 1982; 44 years ago
- Type: Nonprofit
- Registration no.: CC37711
- Legal status: Registered charity
- Headquarters: Takanini Gurdwara
- Members: 550 (financial); 2,000 (non-financial) (2024)
- Official languages: Punjabi, English
- Secretary General: Ranvir Singh Lali
- President: Kartar Singh Dhaliwal
- Vice President: Harwinder Kaur
- Treasurer: Manjinder Singh Bassi
- Spokesperson: Daljit Singh Virk
- Main organ: Executive Committee
- Affiliations: New Zealand Central Sikh Association
- Revenue: NZ$5.3 million (2023)
- Expenses: NZ$3.3 million (2023)
- Staff: 20 (2023)
- Award: People’s Choice NZ Food Heroes Award
- Website: www.supremesikhsociety.co.nz
- Formerly called: New Zealand Sikh Society Auckland Branch

The Supreme Sikh Society of New Zealand is the largest Sikh body in New Zealand responsible for overseeing the day to day operations of gurdwaras, educational institutions and sports facilities. The Society is a registered charity with more than 550 financial members and 2000 non-financial members. The president and most senior officeholders belong to the decision-making committee, known as the Executive Committee.

The Rules and Regulation Committee are the disciplinary authority over the Executive Committee. All members of the Executive Committee, who are elected by an annual general meeting for the term of two years or to fill a position, are responsible to financial members.

== Name ==
The original name of the organisation was "New Zealand Sikh Society Auckland Branch", changed on 2 September 2012 to "Supreme Sikh Society of New Zealand". In casual conversation or writing, the abbreviation "SSSNZ" is sometimes used. Because the headquarters of the Society is the Takanini Gurdwara complex, "Takanini Gurdwara" is commonly used as a metonym for the organisation.

== History ==
Established as the New Zealand Sikh Society Auckland Branch, the Supreme Sikh Society was formed by the Waikato based New Zealand Sikh Society on 6 June 1982 as its Auckland branch. The then Secretary, Jasbir Singh Kalkat made a statutory declaration on 8 June 1982, that the Society was to purchase a property on the corner of Princes Street and Albert Street near the Ōtāhuhu town centre to build a gurdwara.

== Honours ==
The Supreme Sikh Society was honoured with the 2020 People's Choice NZ Food Heroes Award out of 340 nominated organisations for providing food and essential services to people in need during the COVID-19 lockdowns. Hon Dr Megan Woods and Anahila Kanongata'a-Suisuiki proposed motions in the House to congratulate the New Zealand Sikh community and the Supreme Sikh Society for assisting people in their time of need throughout the COVID-19 lockdown period.

== Presidents of the Supreme Sikh Society of New Zealand ==
- Prakash Chandar Sundh (1980-1981)
- Balihar Singh (1981-1982)
- Prithipal Singh Basra (1982-1986)
- Jasvir Singh Kalkat (1986-1990)
- Manjit Singh Shergill (1990-1991) (1992-1993) (1996-1997)
- Piara Singh Buall (1991-1992) (1993-1996)
- Pargat Singh Buall (1997-1998)
- Sukhwinder Singh Basra (1998-1999)
- Ram Singh (1999-2000)
- Swaran Singh (2000-2003)
- Daljit Singh Virk (2003-2005) (2006-2007)
- Santokh Singh Bodal (2005-2006)
- Manpreet Singh Grewal (2007-2008)
- Rajinder Singh Jindi (2008-2009)
- Gurnam Singh Toor (2009-2010)
- Tarsem Singh Dhirowal (2010-2011)
- Hardeep Singh Billu (2011-2012)
- Amar Singh Lahoria (2012-2013)
- Barinder Singh Jinder (2013-2015)
- Harmesh Singh (2015-2017)
- Ranvir Singh Lali (2017-2020)
- Jaswinder Singh Nagra (2020-2022)
- Jasvir Kaur (2022-2024)
- Kartar Singh Dhaliwal (2024-Incumbent)
