= Rebecca Tavo =

Australia & Fiji dual-code rugby international footballer

Personal information
- Born: 23 March 1983 (age 43) Port Hedland, Western Australia
- Height: 1.71 m (5 ft 7 in)
- Weight: 72 kg (11 st 5 lb)

Sport
- Sport: Touch
- Team: Australia

Rugby union career
- Position(s): Centre, Forward
National sevens teams
Years	Team	Comps
2008–2013	Australia 7s	
2015–2016	Fiji 7s	
- Rugby league career

Playing information
Representative
Years	Team	Pld	T	G	FG	P
2002	Australia

Rebecca Tavo (born 23 March 1983) is a former Australian triple international. She has represented Australia in rugby league, rugby sevens and touch. She has captained the Australian women's sevens team. She competed for Australia at the 2009 and 2013 Rugby World Cup Sevens. She also represented Fiji at the Rio Olympics.

== Biography ==
Tavo was part of the Champion Australian Women's Touch team at the 2011 Touch World Cup in Scotland. In 2006, she became BHP Billiton's first female train driver. She is also the first Rotuman Australians female to play rugby internationally.

In 2015, she changed allegiance and played for the Fijiana team in the Oceania 7's helping them to win the tournament as well as qualify for the 2016 Summer Olympics.
