= Shri Swaminarayan Mandir, Auckland =

Coordinates: 36°58′35.71″S 174°51′23.91″E

Shri Swaminarayan Mandir
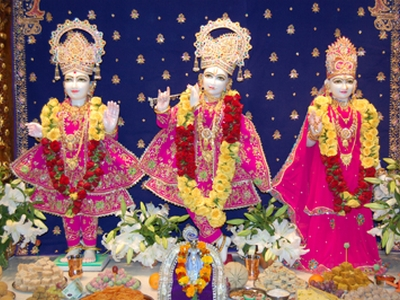
- Radha Krishna Dev murtis at this Temple

Religion
- Affiliation: Hinduism
- Deity: Nar Narayan Dev, Radha Krishna Dev, Ghanshyam Maharaj and Ram parivar

Location
- Location: 10-12 Wentwort Ave, Papatoetoe, Manukau, Auckland
- Country: New Zealand
- Interactive map of Shri Swaminarayan Mandir

Architecture
- Creator: Swaminarayan Sampraday
- Completed: 24 March 2008

Website
- www.isso.org.nz

The Swaminarayan Mandir in Auckland (Devnagari: श्री स्वमिनरयन मन्दिर, औक्क्लन्द) is the second Mandir (Temple) of the Swaminarayan Sampraday in New Zealand. The Mandir comes under the ISSO of the NarNarayan Dev Gadi.

== History ==
Auckland has the highest population density of people of Chinese and Indian cultures and a number of new Hindu temples were opened in recent years.

An Asia New Zealand Foundation report, "Diverse Auckland: The Face of New Zealand in the 21st Century", written by University of Auckland's Dr Wardlow Friesen, says the city will continue to absorb more migrants than the rest of the country.

In his report Dr. Friesen confirms: "On a physical level, the evidence of the emergence of diverse religious practices of the Asian population of Auckland is dramatic."

Recently completed Shri Swaminarayan Temple in Auckland, New Zealand has become a beacon within all Sanatan Dharmic temples purely because of the amount of faith that has been put in God before and during the project. Thousands of hours of service have gone into individually hand carving the walls and ceiling of this temple. Over 5 years, careful planning and implementing took place by the local community of Papatoetoe, Auckland to ensure a new home is made for Swaminarayan. Designing, engineering and construction had gone beyond New Zealand to Hong Kong, India and Europe to ensure results. Intricate wood carvings as per traditional Indian architecture, to grand purpose built moldings, pillars and Shikhars have all been carefully crafted by expert tradesmen from all over the world. Dr. Kantilal Patel and his wife, Mrs Ranjna Patel, two people who were involved in the building of this temple, have been awarded the Queen’s Service Medal (QSM) for their community service.

== Opening of the temple ==
The Murti Pran Pratistha Mahotsav (Deity installation ceremony) was conducted by Acharya Shree Koshalendraprasadji Maharaj, on 24 March 2008. The central Murtis consecrated in the temple are Ghanshyam Maharaj, NarNarayan Dev, RadhaKrishna Dev and Ram Parivar as well as Kul Dev's of the local community.

== See also ==
- Swaminarayan
- Swaminarayan Sampraday
