= Shanker, Punjab =

Village in Punjab, India

Coordinates: 30°45′51″N 75°52′58″E

Shanker village is located in East Ludhiana tehsil in Ludhiana district in the Indian state of Punjab. The village is 13 km from district headquarter Ludhiana. Shankar is also a Gram Panchayat of Shankar village.

Total population of the village 2,799 out of which 1,499 are males and 1,317 are females.

Pin code of this village is 141206.
