= New Zealand Sikh Games =

Annual New Zealand Sikh sport event

The New Zealand Sikh Games (NZ Sikh Games) are an annual sports event for the New Zealand Sikh community. They were started in 2019 with the intention to highlight the Sikh community and the discrimination it faces. Over 50,000 spectators were present at the 2023 edition, with some being from abroad.

Many sports are played during the Games, including some traditional South Asian games such as kabaddi and kho kho. Some Sikh martial arts are also demonstrated during the event.
