= Māori Indians =

Total population
- 4,806 as of 2018 Census. Many more Māori of partial Indian descent

Languages
- English, Māori, Hindi, Punjabi

Related ethnic groups
- Dougla; Māori people; Indian New Zealanders; Punjabi Mexican Americans

Māori Indians (or Indo-Māori) are an ethnic group in New Zealand of people with mixed Māori and Indian ancestry.

== History ==
The earliest record of a mixed Indo-Māori union is said to have occurred in 1810, when an Indian man from Bengal abandoned a shipping vessel to marry a Māori woman. There is also record of an Indian man living with his Māori wife in the Bay of Islands in 1815; another took up residence on Stewart Island after 1814.

Possibly the earliest non-Māori settlers of the Otago region of South Island were three Indian lascars who deserted ship to live among the Māori in 1813. There, they assisted the Ngāi Tahu by passing on new skills and technologies, including how to attack colonial European vessels in the rain when their guns could not be fired. They integrated into Māori culture completely, participating in tā moko and taking on Māori names.

The late 1800s and early 1900s saw the first wave of migration of Indian men and later women arriving to the country. A number of them came directly to New Zealand but some came via Fiji and others via other British colonies such as Burma. In the earliest group of Indian pioneer men were those who came to New Zealand as teenagers. These young men from Punjab and Gujarat were generally looked after by the Māori community, and tended to have unions with Māori women. A number of Indians also enlisted in the Māori Battalion to fight in the Second World War.

The White New Zealand League, established in 1926, was opposed to both Chinese and Indian immigration because it was seen as a threat to the economic prosperity of European New Zealanders. Racial tensions between local Indians and Pākehā/Europeans lasted for decades in Pukekohe, where Indians faced segregation akin to the experiences of African Americans at the time of the Civil rights movement. In this climate of racial hostility, a large number of Punjabi Sikhs, invested in dairy farms and market gardens in order to be self-sufficient. In 1929, a state-appointed committee noted that Māori preferred to work for these Indian employers. However, in the opinion of this committee, there was also concern about the indiscriminate mingling of Māori and Indians.

Of the 3,151 Indians recorded on the 1951 census of New Zealand — 253 were of Māori Indian origin. In 10 years, by the 1961 census, there were just slightly more Indians in New Zealand, while the number of Māori Indians had risen dramatically to 454. Children of these unions were often cast out by the wider Indian community. However, such children continued to be welcomed into the Māori community.

In Te Arawa the most well-known whānau of Indo-Māori descent are the Bhana whānau from Ngāti Whakaue. Another notable family are the children of Bruce Stewart, who are half Indo-Fijian through their mother and grew up at Tapu Te Ranga Marae.

=== 21st century ===
Responses to the 2001 New Zealand census indicated that 1.5% of Indian women and 2% of Indian men in New Zealand were in inter-ethnic unions with a Māori partner. About 18% of children of these unions can converse in the Māori language, while less than 10% could speak an Indian language. Between 2013 and 2018, the New Zealand census reported a 42% increase in the Indo-Māori population.

The first hui (Māori assembly) for people of mixed Māori and Indian descent was held in 2012 in Rotorua. A second assembly was held in 2014, with over 200 mixed Māori Indians in attendance.

Since 2022, the Auckland Tamil Association has also held an annual Māori-Tamil hui to forge stronger relationships between the Indian and Māori communities.

=== Early cultural contact theory ===
An exceptionally well-carved female hei tiki was purchased by a British businessman while in India in 1847. Made between 1700 and 1847, the tiki may indicate trade between the two cultures going back to the 1700s or may have been brought back by an Indian crewmate aboard a colonial vessel. It currently resides in the collection of Te Papa.

Scholar V. R. Ramachandra Dikshitar speculated on the origins of the Tamil Bell, a bronze bell inscribed with Tamil script found near Whangārei. He stated in his 1947 work The Origin and Spread of the Tamils that ancient Tamil sea-farers might have travelled to Australia and Polynesia prior to the arrival of Europeans.

In 1885, Edward Tregear published the controversial book The Aryan Maori (1885), in which he placed the Māori language in the ranks of the Indo-European language family and further claimed, that Māori were descended from Hindu Brahmins who spread south, from India.

A 1954 report by V Lakshmi Pathy, published in the Journal of Polynesian Studies, hinted at similarities between the South Indian Kannada language and various Polynesian languages including Māori.

== Notable people ==
- Lyonel Grant (b. 1957), master carver and sculptor
- Parehuia, Hirini & Kirihika, children of Bruce Stewart
- Marina Khan, international lawn bowler
- Jan Khan, international lawn bowler
- Anjali Mulari, top scorer on the New Zealand women's national ice hockey team

== See also ==
- Punjabi Mexican Americans, a community in Northern California originating from intermarriage between Punjabi immigrant men and Mexican immigrant women
- Dougla people, a term used in the Caribbean to describe people of mixed Afro-Caribbean and Indo-Caribbean descent
- Chindians, people of mixed Chinese and Indian descent
- Māori-Croatians, a similar community of mixed Māori and Croatian descent formed from Croatian immigrants to New Zealand who joined Māori communities
