= Takanini Gurdwara =

- ਟਾਕਾਨੀਨੀ ਗੁਰਦੁਆਰਾ (Punjabi)
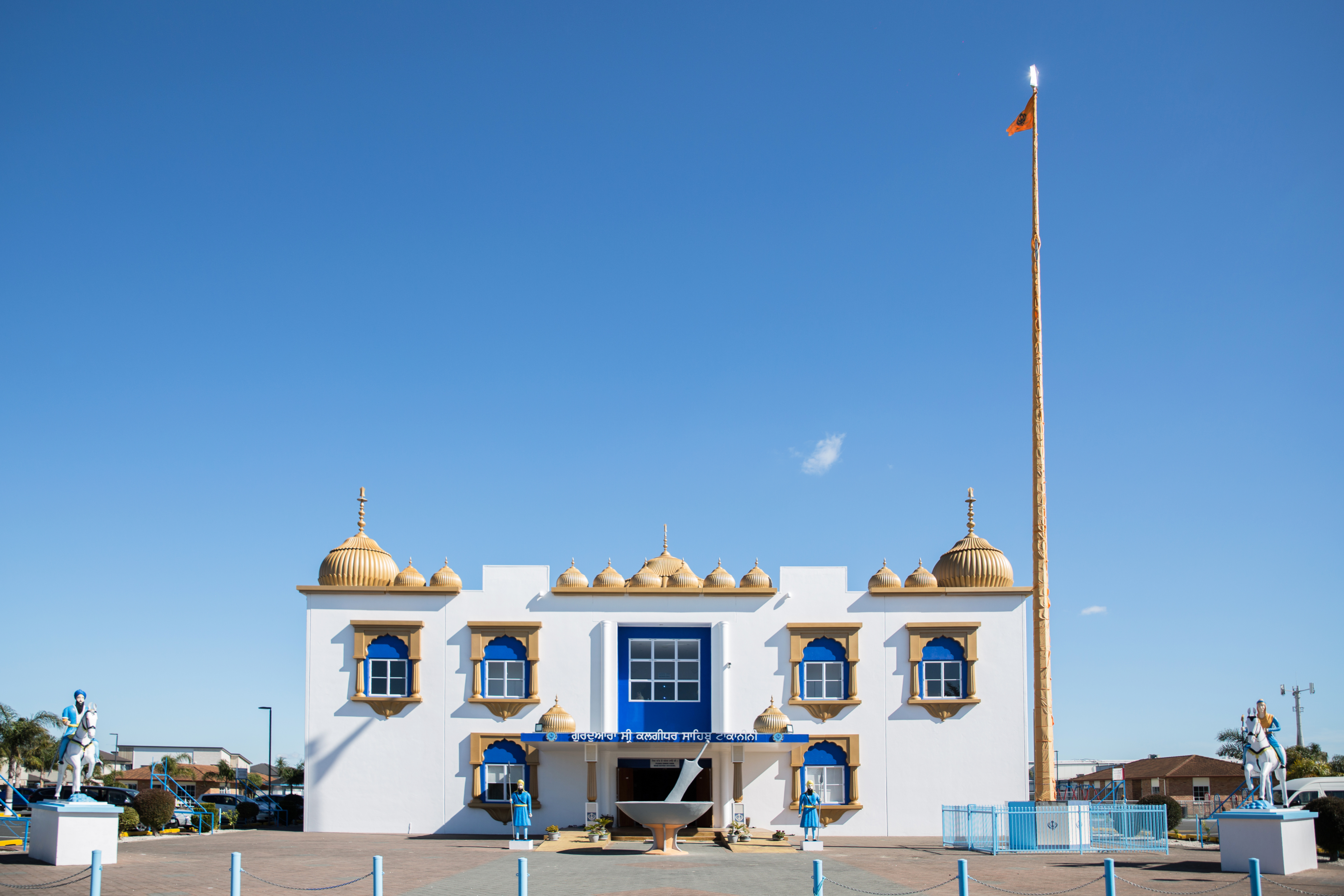
- Gurdwara Sri Kalgidhar Sahib in 2020
- Interactive map of the Takanini Gurdwara area

General information
- Type: Gurdwara
- Architectural style: Sikh architecture
- Location: 70 Takanini School Road, Takanini, Auckland, New Zealand
- Coordinates: 37.035525800330696°S 174.9214458877212°E
- Construction started: 2002
- Opened: 13 March 2005; 21 years ago
- Cost: NZ$6.5 million
- Operator: Supreme Sikh Society of New Zealand

Design and construction
- Awards: People’s Choice NZ Food Heroes Award
- Known for: Largest gurdwara in New Zealand

Website
- www.supremesikhsociety.co.nz

The Takanini Gurdwara also referred to as Gurdwara Sri Kalgidhar Sahib, is the largest Sikh gurdwara in New Zealand.

== History ==
Auckland's first gurdwara, Sri Guru Nanak Dev Sikh Sangat opened on Princes Street near Ōtāhuhu town centre in 1986. Under the management of the New Zealand Sikh Society Auckland, formed on 6 June 1982, now the Supreme Sikh Society of New Zealand, the Ōtāhuhu Gurdwara and Sikh community flourished. With the guidance of an advisory committee formed in 2001, the Society purchased 3.5 hectares of land on Takanini School Road and laid the foundation stone for a new gurdwara on 11 August 2002. The Gurdwara was officially opened on 13 March 2005 in the presence of Prime Minister Helen Clark.
