= Jagt Singh =

New Zealand World War 1 soldier of Indian heritage

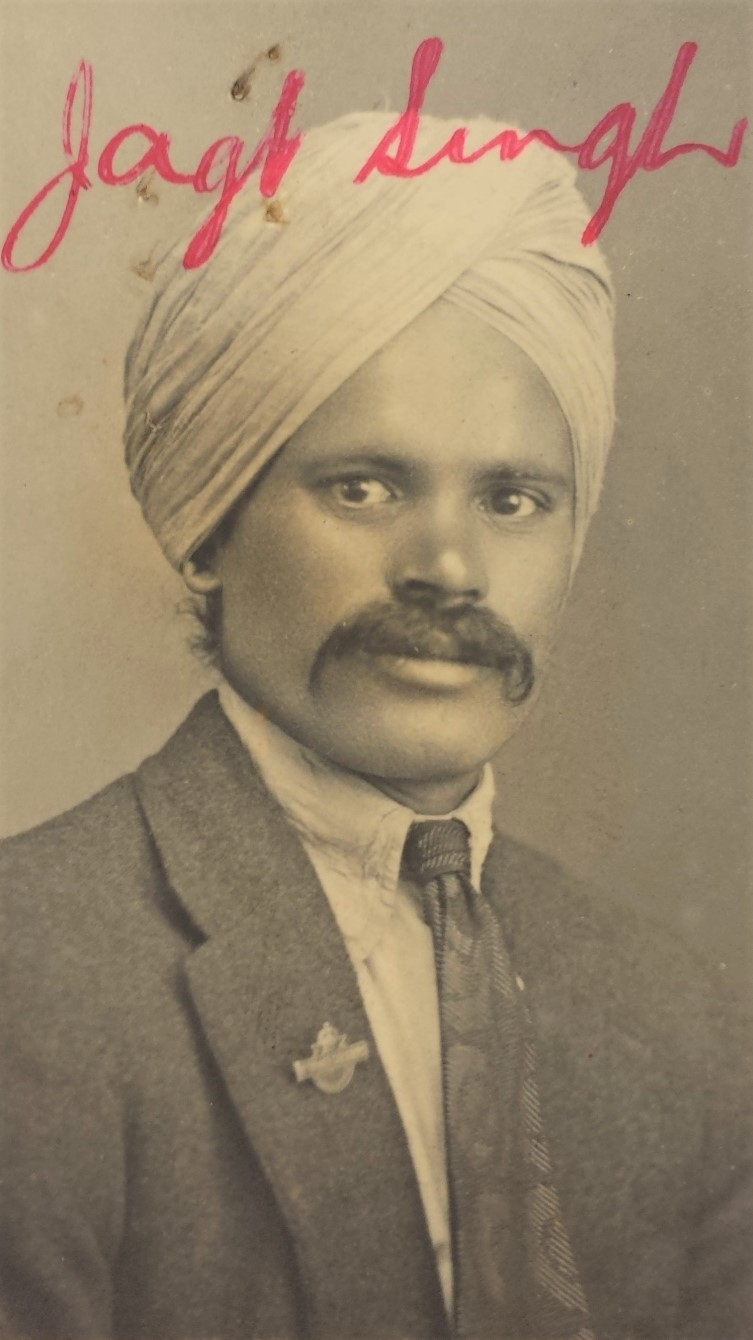
- Jagt Singh, 1921
- Born: 1 January 1889; Punjab, India
- Died: unknown
- Military career
- Allegiance: New Zealand India
- Branch: Army
- Service years: 1914-1918
- Nickname: Soldier Singh
- Service number: WWI 11/1011 WWI 11/1011a
- Unit: New Zealand Mounted Rifles
- Conflicts: Gallipoli
- Awards: 1914-1915 Star Victory Medal British War Medal

Jagt Singh ਜਗਤ ਸਿੰਘ (1 January 1889- unknown) also known as Soldier Singh, was a New Zealand World War 1 soldier of Indian heritage.

Before serving in the New Zealand Army, Singh served in the Indian Army in the cavalry regiment, 20th Deccan Horse where he earned the name ‘Soldier Singh’.

== Life and First World War ==
Singh was born in the Indian state of Punjab in 1889 to father Sawan Singh. He left his village of Shankar before in 1913, at the age of 24, immigrating to New Zealand.

After a year of living in New Zealand, Singh enlisted in the Army. It is recorded that Singh, at time of enlistment, resided in Manakau and his occupation was labourer and sawmill hand. Singh was one of a small group of Indian New Zealanders to serve New Zealand in World War I.

Due to systematic racial and religious prejudice of the time, it was not easy for willing Indians in New Zealand to be accepted for service in the New Zealand Army. Despite Indian immigrants living in New Zealand being British subjects, they were often not accepted or dismissed early.

World War I Nomination Rolls have Singh's name as 'Tagt Singh', although he also appears throughout archives as Jagt Singh.

Singh entered the Trentham Military Camp in January 1915, serving a total of four years and 176 days. Singh served in two campaigns during his enlistment, Gallipoli 1915-1916 and Egypt 1914-1916. On 14 February Singh embarked to Suez Egypt, arrived on 26 March 1915. He served as a trooper in the New Zealand Mounted Rifles and 3rd Reinforcements.

In August 1915, during the Battle of Chunuk Bair, Singh’s leg was wounded and he was taken to hospital in Heliopolis. After a swift recovery, Singh returned to his unit in Palestine and Egypt. In 1916 Singh was moved from the Wellington Mounted Rifles to the Auckland Mounted Rifles.

Due to persisting injuries suffered in Gallipoli, Singh was discharged from the New Zealand Army on 5 December 1919.

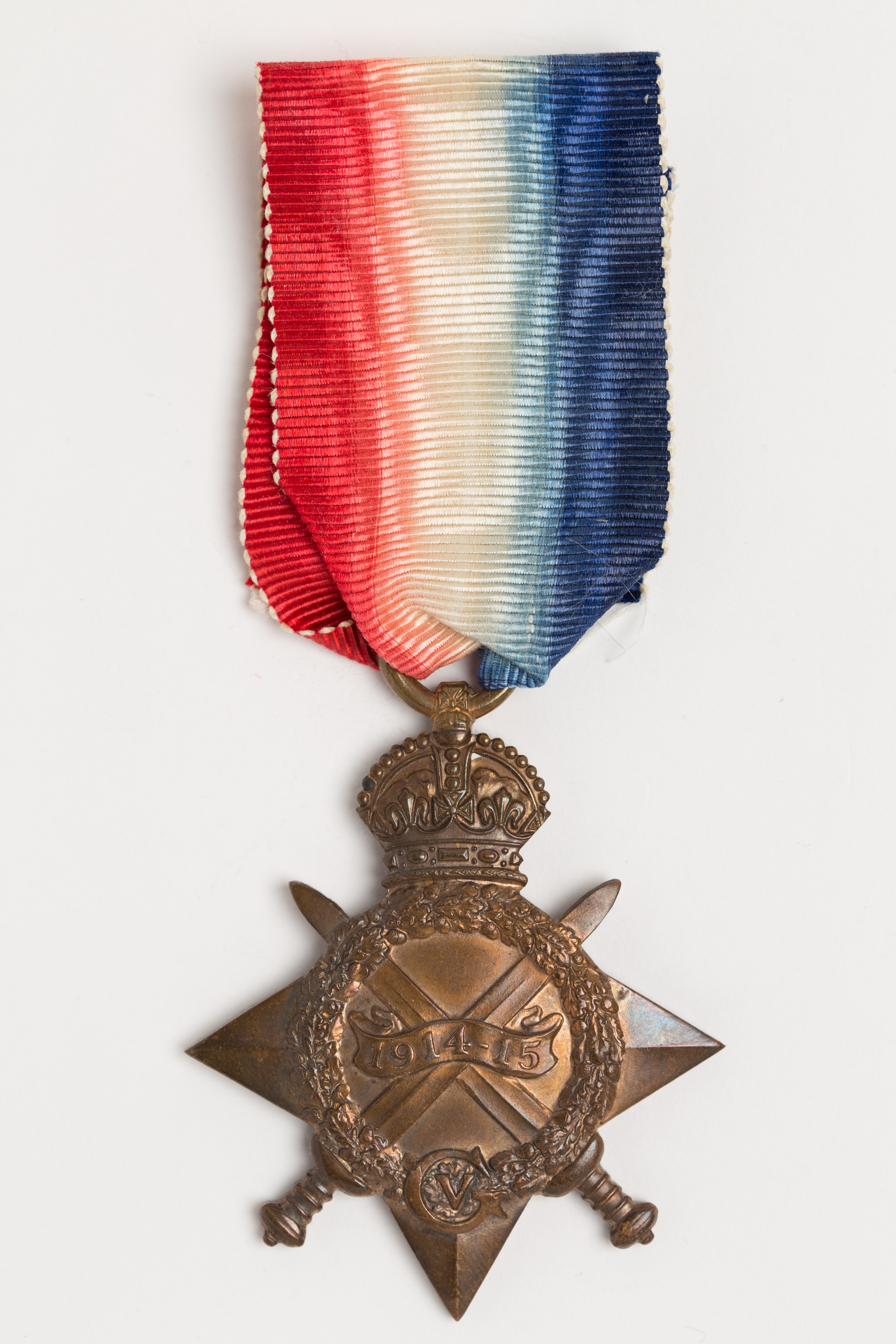
Example of the 1914-1915 Star that Singh received for his service in WWI.

After his discharge in 1919 Singh visited Bombay, India before returning to the New Zealand Army. Eventually Singh moved back to India, returning to New Zealand for work on a few occasions.

== Legacy ==
Singh was awarded the 1914-1915 Star, the Victory Medal and the British War Medal (1914-1920).

In 2016 a documentary film by Vijay Singh, Farewell My Indian Soldier, was made that shared the stories of Indian soldiers that fought in the WWI. This film includes reference to soldier Jagt Singh.
