= Phomen Singh =

Early Indian migrant to New Zealand (died 1935)

- ਫੁੰਮਣ ਸਿੰਘ
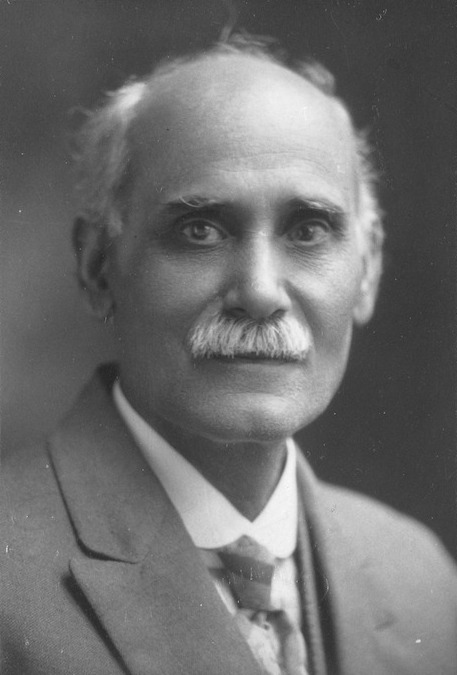
- 1920s passport portrait of Singh
- Born: 1869/1870; Punjab, India
- Died: 27 May 1935; Palmerston North, New Zealand
- Other names: Phuman Singh; Phomen Singh Gill

Phomen Singh (Punjabi: ਫੁੰਮਣ ਸਿੰਘ; 1869/1870 – 27 May 1935), also known Phuman Singh and Phomen Singh Gill, was an Indian businessman. He was one of the earliest Indian migrants to New Zealand, where he founded a successful confectionery business.

== Life and career ==
Singh was born in Punjab, India, and was brought up in the Moga district, in a village called Charik where his Sikh family were farmers. His father, Bela Singh, and mother, Sundar, had three sons, of which Phomen was the second. In the 1880s, Singh's older brother Bir Singh travelled to Hong Kong and then settled in Australia. The Singh family did not hear from Bir after he departed from India, and as a result, Phomen was sent on behalf of the family to find his brother. At 22, Singh travelled to Australia and found his brother; they both stayed there for three years. Instead of returning home to India, the two Singh brothers travelled to New Zealand, arriving in about 1890.

While there were already Indians in New Zealand, the Singh brothers were among the first recorded immigrants from Punjab; they marked the start of three ripples of Punjabi migration before the Immigration Restriction Amendment Act of 1920. Two copies of the Guru Granths, the religious scripture of Sikhism, were present in New Zealand by 1930, the first of which was brought over by Phomen Singh in 1892. In an early racist encounter in Auckland, Singh's turban was unravelled and his hair exposed. Soon after, Singh cut his hair and no longer wore a turban.

The brothers soon went their separate ways, Bir travelled the Whanganui area and worked as a herbalist where he met and married a Māori woman. Bir also prepared food for troops during World War I who were stationed at Trentham Camp. Phomen remained in Auckland and began his career as a confectioner. Under the guidance of a Muslim confectioner, Singh learned to make sweets. He then moved from Auckland to Wellington, where he became a hawker and sold Indian sweets, curries, and chutneys out of a suitcase door to door. During Singh's time in Wellington he met a nurse, Margaret Ford from Kent, England. The couple married on 5 April 1898 in Whanganui. The couple had three sons and one daughter, and later, eight grandchildren.

Singh started a confectionery company alongside business partner Charlie Abraham, a Muslim man. Abraham, Singh, and Company, Indian Lollie Manufacturers, disbanded soon after formation in 1898 by mutual consent of Singh and Abraham. Singh took over the business on his own. Singh rented shops in Whanganui's Victoria Avenue and Wilson Street and his family lived behind one of the shops. Singh employed a Sikh man named Ganda Singh, who came from the region of Malwa in Punjab, at his confectionery factory on Wilson Street. Ganda Singh migrated to Aotearoa New Zealand around 1899 and also led an Indian troupe that performed traditional dance and entertainment throughout local towns.

By 1915, the Singh family had moved to New Plymouth, Eltham, and Marton in New Zealand's North Island. In each of these towns, Singh opened a sweet and fruit shop named Eureka, but business did not thrive. It was not until 1924 to 1925 in Palmerston North that business flourished at Singh's shops on The Square and Rangitikei Street. Singh also owned an orchard in Brunswick for a short period before selling and moving on. Singh and his family made confectionery at their Palmerston North home at 16 Andrew Young Street and sold it at their local shops and to nearby towns by horse-drawn van. In 1932, Singh's daughter Kartari Singh was married in Te Aroha, the event garnered great public interest; it made multiple newspaper outlets at the time. It was noted that Phomen Singh was dedicated to following the traditions of a Sikh marriage ceremony.

Singh made one last trip to India, where he stayed for a year and eight months to recuperate from ill-health. Soon after arriving back in New Zealand, Singh died in his Palmerston North home on 27 May 1935, after a prolonged period of sickness. His funeral was held at the Karori Crematorium in Wellington. Before his death, Singh donated his prized copy of Max Arthur Macauliffe's book The Sikh Religion VI to the Palmerston North Public Library. Phomen Singh is noted among New Zealand's first Indian settlers with his career movements widely documented through newspapers of the time.
