= Rebecca Singh =

Rebecca Singh (born 28 January 1975) is a Fijian-born news presenter, formerly on TV3. She is the first Indian woman to front the news on a New Zealand television channel.

She was born in Fiji and grew up in Nadi where her father worked as a communications officer at Nadi International Airport. She was educated at Jasper Williams High School and the University of the South Pacific. She joined Fiji Television and rose up the ranks to become a presenter for the evening news. After the 2000 Fijian coup d'état, she left Fiji and joined TV3 in 2001 beginning work as a reporter, producer, presenter and foreign editor. In 2003 she moved to TVNZ's Queer Nation. She returned to TV3 in 2004 to produce Nightline, to provide environmental reporting as well as presenting. She later moved to London to work for Al Jazeera.

She contributes to cultural activities organised by the local Indo-Fijian community. She has hosted the Bollywood Dance Competition which is a part of the Diwali Festival.

== Personal life ==
In 2008, she entered into a civil union with her girlfriend of 5 years, Kelly Rice.
