= Amandeep Singh (cricketer) =

New Zealand cricketer (born 1987)

Personal information
- Born: 17 August 1987 (age 39); Punjab, India
- Batting: Right-handed
- Bowling: Right arm fast-medium

Domestic team information
- Years: Team
- 2005/06: Northern Districts
- 2006/07–2007/08: Canterbury

Career statistics
Competition	First-class
Matches	4
Runs scored	13
Batting average	4.33
100s/50s	0/0
Top score	6
Balls bowled	480
Wickets	7
Bowling average	40.14
5 wickets in innings	0
10 wickets in match	0
Best bowling	2/38
Catches/stumpings	0/–
- Source: Cricinfo, 16 February 2010

Amandeep Singh (born 17 August 1987) is an Indian-born cricketer who played four first-class matches in New Zealand, one for Northern Districts during the 2005–06 season and three for Canterbury over the following two seasons. He is a right-handed batsman and fast-medium bowler.

Singh was born in Punjab in India in 1987. He attended Lincoln University and played club cricket for Sydenham.
