= Rocky Khan =

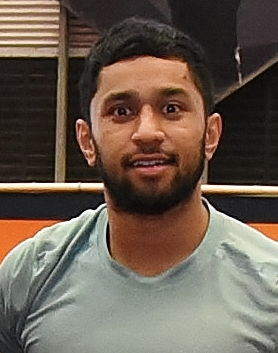
- Khan in 2017
- Born: 6 May 1989 (age 37) Auckland, New Zealand
- Height: 1.78 m (5 ft 10 in)
- Weight: 85 kg (187 lb)
- School: Mount Albert Grammar School

Rugby union career
- Position(s): scrum-half, wing, fly half
Amateur team(s)
| Years | Team | Apps | (Points) |
| 2009- | Ponsonby RFC | | |
National sevens team
| Years | Team | | Comps |
- New Zealand

Rocky Khan (born 6 May 1989 in Auckland, New Zealand) is a New Zealand rugby union player. He plays on the wing, flyhalf and fullback in 15's rugby or at halfback in 7's rugby.

Khan studied at Edendale Primary School, Balmoral Intermediate and Mount Albert Grammar School and is currently studying at the Auckland University of Technology in Sports science. He is of Indo-Fijian and Rotuman descent. His father, Fared Khan who was a devouted Muslim, represented Fiji as a goal keeper in football. His mother was Rotuman. He became the first Fijian of Indian ancestry to represent New Zealand in sevens when he made his debut in the 2013 Wellington Sevens. He played a lot of rugby during his school days representing the Mount Albert Grammar School (MAGS) under 15s, Mount Albert Grammar 1st 15 and the Auckland rugby age group teams. He has also played for the Auckland Men's 7s, the Grammar Carlton Rugby Club and currently plays for Ponsonby RFC.

He made his impact while representing Ponsonby 7's during the 2011 Uprising International Sevens which was held in Fiji, due to his eligibility, The Fiji Sevens selectors wanted him to join their side but he said he would "consider" an offer to play for Fiji but his focus now was on pursuing his sports and recreation degree. He also helped Auckland win their 10th NZ National Sevens title by beating Taranaki 36–26 in Queenstown that year. He has also previously represented Borneo Eagles
