= St Joseph's Secondary School, Fiji =

All-girls school in Suva, Fiji

St Joseph's Secondary School

Location
- Waimanu Rd, Suva, Fiji
- 18.1311°S 178.4364°E

Information
- Type: Catholic all-girls school
- Motto: "Pietas Cum Scientia"
- Established: 1956
- Principal: Jacqueline Low (current principal)
- Enrollment: 700+
- Colors: Blue and white
- Uniform: Standard ladies white blouse, Blue skirt

St Joseph's Secondary School is an all-girls school located in Suva, Fiji. The school was founded in 1956 and has established itself as one of the top schools around the country, progressing in the fields of academics and sports. The counterpart school for boys is Marist Brothers High School located in Flagstaff in Fiji.

== History ==
St Joseph's Secondary School's history began in September 1888 when four pioneer sisters were missioned to Fiji at the invitation of Bishop Vidal to provide education for the people of Fiji.

The sisters were Mother Martin and Sister (Sr) Tarcisius Mongin of France, Sr Mary of the Holy Name of Ireland and Sr Frances Chambers of Newfoundland, Canada

All three sisters are buried in the old Suva Cemetery.

In 1938 (which was the golden jubilee of the sisters' arrival in Fiji) the sisters opened a secondary department on the third floor of St Anne's Primary School – it was called St Philomena's.

There was also a small secondary branch attached to St Joseph's Primary School which was on the site where the Reserve Bank is now, next to the Sacred Heart Cathedral.

It was in 1956 that both secondary departments of St Anne's (St Philomena's) and St Joseph's Primary (St Joseph's Secondary) were transferred to the present site.

The staff was mainly sisters of the congregation.

The school celebrated its 60th jubilee in September 2016 with old pupils returning from all over the world.

== Extracurricular activities ==
=== Sports ===
The school encourages its students to participate in extracurricular activities. Sports offered include netball, field hockey, basketball, track and field, swimming, archery, chess, soccer, and volleyball. The school has produced athletes who have represented Fiji in international competitions. St Joseph's is known for the many sporting titles they have achieved, especially advancing to the finals of the majority of Fiji Secondary Schools netball and hockey tournaments. The school also returned to the Coca-Cola games after a lapse of many years, not placing below fourth for the past four years.

=== School concert ===
St Joseph's stages an annual concert featuring music from all ethnicities represented in the student body.

== Notable alumni ==
- Sisilia Seavula – Coca-Cola games 100m blue ribbon event winner, 2015 Pacific Games gold medalist, participated at 2016 Rio Olympics
- Prerna Lal – writer and DREAM Act activist, resides in the US
- Shireen Lateef – women's rights activist
- Lagamu Vuiyasawa - politician
- Dr. Teresia Teaiwa - senior lecturer and programme director at Victoria University
- Neharika Gambir - first Fijian Astronaut
- Sela Saumi - first Fiji Airways female captain and pilot
- Helena Young - Athletics Fiji sprinter & Pacific Games Gold medalist
- Filomena Tuivanualevu - Miss Fiji 2008
- Peggy Ravusiro - Miss Fiji 2025
- Ailava Samuels - First runner up at Miss Fiji 2025 and Miss Pacific Islands 2026
- Gaëtane Austin - Founder of Pure Fiji
- Valerie Nainima - former Fiji Basketball representative and current coach of Providence Friars women's basketball
- Bernadette Rounds Ganilau - Fijian broadcaster, politician & writer
- Dr. Katerina Teaiwa - artist & Banaban scholar
- Moana Wind - Fijian swimmer & national record holder
- Venice Traill - Fijian taekwondo practitioner
