= Miss Samoa =

National beauty pageant in Samoa

- Formation: 1986
- Type: Beauty Pageant
- Headquarters: Apia
- Location: Samoa
- Members: Miss Pacific Islands
- Official language: English; Samoan

Miss Samoa is the national beauty pageant of Samoa, established in 1986. The competition is overseen by the Samoa Tourism Authority (formerly the Samoa Visitors Bureau) and is held annually as part of the Teuila Festival, one of Samoa’s largest cultural events. The winner serves as a cultural ambassador for Samoa, promoting the country both regionally and internationally throughout her reign, and traditionally goes on to compete in the Miss Pacific Islands pageant.

== History ==
The Miss Samoa pageant was established and administered by the Samoa Visitors Association in late 1986 and handed over to the Samoa Visitors Bureau in 1996. The pageant was created in conjunction with tourism and has remained under its authority ever since. In 1987 the first Miss Samoa was crowned she was Ursula Elizabeth Curry who went on to represent Samoa in the first ever Miss South Pacific Pageant (name changed 2015 to Miss Pacific Islands). As years followed the winner of Miss Samoa under the guidance of the Samoan Tourism Authority went on to compete in the Miss South Pacific Pageant. In 1996 Verona Ah Ching made history being the first Miss Samoa to ever be crowned Miss South Pacific.

The Miss Samoa Pageant is an annual event dedicated to supporting opportunities for young Samoan women. The winner of pageant is given the opportunity to promote Samoa regionally and internationally as the face of Samoa and work as a national ambassador during her year reign, as of 2000 the Miss Samoa Pageant has been the finale of the annual Teuila Festival. In 2018 it was announced for the first time in the 32-year history of the pageant it will be held and hosted in the big island of Savai’i later that year Sonia Piva was crowned Miss Samoa 2018 making history being the first and only winner to be crowned in Savai’i.

In a history making decision by Samoa Tourism Authority the owners of the Miss Samoa Pageant, it was announced that there will be no the Miss Samoa Pageant for the year of 2020 due to the coronavirus pandemic months before the scheduled Miss Samoa 2020 pageant in September.

The Miss Samoa Pageant provides opportunities for young Samoan women to serve as national representatives. The titleholder works with the Samoa Tourism Authority to promote Samoan culture, heritage, and tourism at both local and international levels.

== Titleholders ==
=== Miss Samoa ===
Before 1997 Samoa named Western Samoa and debuted at Miss World in 1977, Miss Universe in 1981, and Miss Pacific Islands in 1993 (or previously, Miss South Pacific).

Year	Miss Samoa	Notes
1977	Ana Decima Schmidt	Wearing "Western Samoa" at Miss World 1977: the Miss Samoa winners set to Miss World from 1977 to 1980
1978	Rosalina Sapolu	
1979	Danira Leilani Schwalger	
1980	Liliu Tapuai	
1981	Lenita Marianne Schwalger	Wearing "Western Samoa" at Miss Universe 1981: the Miss Samoa winners set to Miss Universe from 1981 to 1986
1982	Ivy Warner	
1983	Falute Mama Aluni	
1984	Lena Slade	
1985	Tracey Mihaljevich	
1986	Joan Kasileta Gabriel	
1987	Ursula Elizabeth Curry	Withdrew from Miss Universe, the main winner allocated to Miss World 1987
1988	Tualagi Keil	
1989	Ainslie Fitisemanu	
1990	Tapa’au Folasa Samoa	
1991	Sina Creevey	1st Runner Up - Miss South Pacific 1991
1992	Soloia Meleisea	
1993	Yolande Mareta Craig	4th Runner Up -Miss South Pacific 1993 (Debuted at Miss South Pacific as "Western Samoa")
1994	Liliolevao Malietoa	1st Runner Up - Miss South Pacific 1994
1995	Marie Enosa	
1996	Verona Ah Ching	Miss South Pacific 1996
1997	Mary-Jane Moe Mckibbin	Miss South Pacific 1997
1998	Cheri Moana Robinson	Miss South Pacific 1998
1999	Taralina Gae'e	3rd Runner Up - Miss South Pacific 1999
2000	Petra Suhren	1st Runner Up - Miss South Pacific 2000
2001	Manamea Apelu	Miss South Pacific 2001
2002	Anita Jamieson	3rd Runner Up - Miss South Pacific 2002
2003	Punipuao Cilla Brown	2nd Runner - Miss South Pacific 2003
2004	Saifaleupolu Tamasese	
2005	Falute Sauvao Vaauli	2nd Runner Up - Miss South Pacific 2005
2006	Pearl McFall	She won Miss Samoa on the pageant night but later disqualified due to being underage
2006	Poinsettia Taefu	1st Runner Up - Miss South Pacific 2006
2007	Sherry Natalie Elekana	2nd Runner Up - Miss South Pacific 2007
2008	Gwendolyn Tuaitanu	1st Runner Up - Miss South Pacific 2008
2009	Jacinta Bourne	Resigned on October 2009, prior to Miss South Pacific in November, 2009
2009	Tusisaleia Hope Pomele	4th Runner Up - Miss South Pacific 2009 & Resigned from Miss Samoa on February 2010, serving only 4 months from October 2009 to February 2010
2009	Tavalea Nilon	
2010	Jolivette Menime Ete	2nd Runner Up - Miss South Pacific 2010
2011	Olevia Ioane	
2012	Janine Nicky Tuivaiti	Miss South Pacific 2012
2013	Susana Fanueli	2nd Runner Up - Miss South Pacific 2013
2014	Latafale Auva'a	Miss Pacific Islands 2014
2015	Ariana Taufao	1st Runner Up - Miss Pacific Islands 2015
2016	Priscilla Olano	3rd Runner Up - Miss Pacific Islands 2016
2017	Alexandra Iakopo	1st Runner Up - Miss Pacific Islands 2017
2018	Sonia Piva	2nd Runner Up - Miss Pacific Islands 2018
2019	Fonoifafo Mcfarland-Seumanu	Miss Pacific Islands 2019-2021
2022	Haylanni Pearl Mataupu Kuruppu	1st Runner Up - Miss Pacific Islands 2022 & Vice Miss Global 2023 (First Runner Up)
2023	Moemoana Safa'ato'a Schwenke	Miss Pacific Islands 2024
2024	Litara Loma Leilani Ieremia-Allan	Miss Pacific Islands 2025
2025	Feagaimaali'i Soti Mapu	2nd Runner Up - Miss Pacific Islands 2026
2026	Poumau Astesclanalesusi Ah Lam Tiufea Va'a	TBA

== Samoa at international pageants ==
=== Miss Universe Samoa ===
- : Declared as Winner
- : Ended as runner-up or top 5/6 qualification
- : Ended as one of the finalists or semi-finalists
- : Ended as special awards winner

On occasion, when the winner does not qualify (due to age) for either contest, a runner-up is sent.

Year	District	Miss Samoa	Placement at Miss Universe	Special Award(s)	Notes
Leiataualesa Jerry Brunt directorship — a franchise holder to Miss Universe from 2024
Did not compete in 2025
2024	Tuamasaga	Haylanni Pearl Mataupu Kuruppu	Unplaced		
Samoa’s Annual National Teuila Festival directorship — a franchise holder to Miss Universe between 1981—1986
Did not compete between 1987—2023: Before 1997, Samoa competed as Miss Western Samoa at Miss Universe competition.
1986	Tuamasaga	Tu'iamanu'ula Kaye Hunt	Unplaced		
1985	Tuamasaga	Tracey Mihaljevich	Unplaced		
1984	Tuamasaga	Lena Slade	Unplaced		
1983	Tuamasaga	Falute Mama Aluni	Unplaced		
1982	Tuamasaga	Ivy Warner	Unplaced		
1981	Tuamasaga	Lenita Marianne Schwalger	Unplaced		

== Miss Samoa Regional Pageant Winners ==
Winner of Miss Samoa Regional Pageant from outside of Samoa such as Miss Samoa New Zealand, Miss Samoa Australia, Miss Samoa Victoria, Miss Samoa New South Wales and Miss Samoa USA.

Color keys

- : Declared as Winner
- : Ended as runner-up or Top 5/6 qualification
- : Ended as one of the Finalists
- : Ended as one of the Semi-finalists
- : Ended as special awards winner

Year	Name	Regional Pageant	Placement at Miss Samoa
2026	Millie Rhonda Samuelu	Miss Samoa New South Wales	1st Runner Up
2026	Hope Faith Kaumatule	Miss Samoa Hawaii	2nd Runner Up
2025	Priscilla Tato	Miss Samoa New South Wales	2nd Runner Up
2025	Paulina Ave'ese Tapua'i-Soti	Miss Samoa New Zealand	Unplaced
2025	Ammaryllis Savannah Moana Manuma	Miss Samoa USA	Unplaced
2025	Larona Junelle Tivoli	Miss Samoa Queensland	Unplaced
2024	Chantelle Tautunuafatasi	Miss Samoa Victoria	4th Runner Up
2024	Epiphanyetaline Agalelei Vaomua Wright	Miss Samoa New South Wales	Unplaced
2024	Tanara Sue Fa'amausili	Miss Samoa Hawaii	Unplaced
2024	Anastasia Pagostar Maiai	Miss Tausala America	Unplaced
2024	So'otuli Ausage Pepe	Miss Samoa Queensland	Unplaced
2024	Josephina Fa'atupufilemu Lealaitafea	Miss Samoa USA	Unplaced
2024	Precious Mirama Tusega	Miss Samoa New Zealand	Unplaced
2023	Moemoana Safa'ato'a Schwenke	Miss Samoa New South Wales	Winner (Miss Pacific Islands 2024 Winner)
2023	Cherish Faamanu Manai	Miss Samoa New Zealand	Unplaced
2022	Haylanni Pearl Mataupu Kuruppu	Miss Samoa Melbourne	Winner
2022	Shilohm Vaeluaga Filipi	Miss Samoa New Zealand	1st Runner Up
2022	Olivia Grace Unasa Siaosi	Miss Samoa Victoria	3rd Runner Up
2022	Jessika Laletupu Ki	Miss Samoa Los Angeles	Unplaced
2022	Valentine Tanya Tago	Miss Samoa New South Wales	Unplaced
2019	Fonoifafo Mcfarland-Seumanu	Miss Samoa New Zealand	Winner (Miss Pacific Islands 2019 Winner)
2019	Fetui Tuetue	Miss Samoa New South Wales	1st Runner Up
2019	Trinity Rosalind Robertson-Asuega	Miss Samoa Los Angeles	2nd Runner Up
2019	Latisha Sialaloa	Miss Samoa Melbourne	3rd Runner Up
2019	Tiafau Zahriya Leaoasoma	Miss Samoa Victoria	4th Runner Up
2019	Shecki’nah Hadfield-Tooala	Miss Samoa Australia	Unplaced
2018	Cecilia Tufuga Fatu	Miss Samoa New Zealand	1st Runner Up
2018	Retalila Temareti	Miss Samoa New South Wales	3rd Runner Up
2018	Erin Noelani Taefu	Miss Samoa Australia	4th Runner Up
2018	Norah Aloiai	Miss Samoa Victoria	Unplaced
2018	Lanuola Giselle Price	Miss Samoa Melbourne	Unplaced
2017	Fasi Faitafa Liolevave	Miss Samoa New South Wales	1st Runner Up
2017	Adele Faaosofia	Miss Samoa Victoria	2nd Runner Up
2017	Natalie Leitulagi Toevai	Miss Samoa New Zealand	4th Runner Up
2017	Hopelynn Aisi Toloa	Miss Samoa Australia	Unplaced
2016	Naomi Eta Fruean	Miss Samoa New Zealand	3rd Runner Up
2016	Tayla Scanlan	Miss Samoa New South Wales	4th Runner Up
2016	Miriama Meafou	Miss Samoa Australia	1st Runner Up
2015	Ariana Phillipa Taufao	Miss Samoa Australia	Winner
2015	Tuutasioaiga Jessica Taulaga	Miss Samoa New South Wales	1st Runner Up
2015	Christina Taefu	Miss Samoa New Zealand	2nd Runner Up
2014	Latafale Auva’a	Miss Samoa New Zealand	Winner (Miss Pacific Islands 2014 Winner)
2014	Tusipepa Sandra Lilomaiava	Miss Samoa Australia	Unplaced
2013	Muliagatele Renera Thompson	Miss Samoa Australia	1st Runner Up
2013	Margaret Sarona Scott	Miss Samoa New Zealand	Did Not Compete
2012	Penina Maree Paeu	Miss Samoa New Zealand	Did Not Compete
2012	Mary Paklieata Pilia’e Tomasi Greatz	Miss Samoa Australia	Did Not Compete
2011	Metotisi Komiti Fa’alavaau	Miss Samoa New Zealand	Did Not Compete
2011	Rebecca Sutherton	Miss Samoa Australia	Did Not Compete
2010	Maree Angelica Wright	Miss Samoa New Zealand	1st Runner Up
2010	Sallie Wulf-Peterson	Miss Samoa Australia	2nd Runner Up
2009	Tuisaleia Hope Pomele	Miss Samoa USA	1st Runner Up (later crowned Miss Samoa)
2009	Grace Schmidt Alai	Miss Samoa Australia	
2009	Christina Fa’afili	Miss Samoa New Zealand	
2008	Gwendolyn Pona Tuaitanu	Miss Samoa USA	Winner
2008	Amiley Faleafaga	Miss Samoa New Zealand	
2007	Sherry Elekana	Miss Samoa New Zealand	Winner
2007	Roseanna Pedebone	Miss Samoa Australia	
2006	Josie Fuimaono-Sapolu	Miss Samoa New Zealand	
2006	Loretta Marina Frost	Miss Samoa Australia	
2005	Merelina Saseve	Miss Samoa New Zealand	
2005	Rosina Paulo	Miss Samoa New South Wales	
2004	Dorian Scanlan	Miss Samoa New Zealand	
2003	Rosemary Tuaimalo	Miss Samoa New Zealand	
2002	Ronna Seyleck-Lee	Miss Samoa New Zealand	
2001	Jody Jackson	Miss Samoa New Zealand	
2001	Adeline Amituanai	Miss Samoa Australia	
2000	Elaine Ward	Miss Samoa New Zealand	
1999	Susana Talagi	Miss Samoa New Zealand	
1999	Gina Tafea	Miss Samoa Victoria, Miss Samoa Australia	
1998	Cherish Fitisemanu	Miss Samoa Australia	
1997	Susan Pa’u	Miss Samoa New Zealand	
1996	Sovita Mauga	Miss Samoa New Zealand	
1995	Mary-Jane Moe Mckibbin	Miss Samoa Australia	
1995	Roxanna Clark	Miss Samoa New Zealand	
1994	Sharon Iputau	Miss Samoa New Zealand	
1993	Lorna Meleisea	Miss Samoa New Zealand	
1992	Julia Toevai	Miss Samoa New Zealand	Did Not Compete (Miss Pacific Islands 1992 Winner)
1991	Marceena Fris	Miss Samoa New Zealand	Did Not Compete

== Titleholders ==
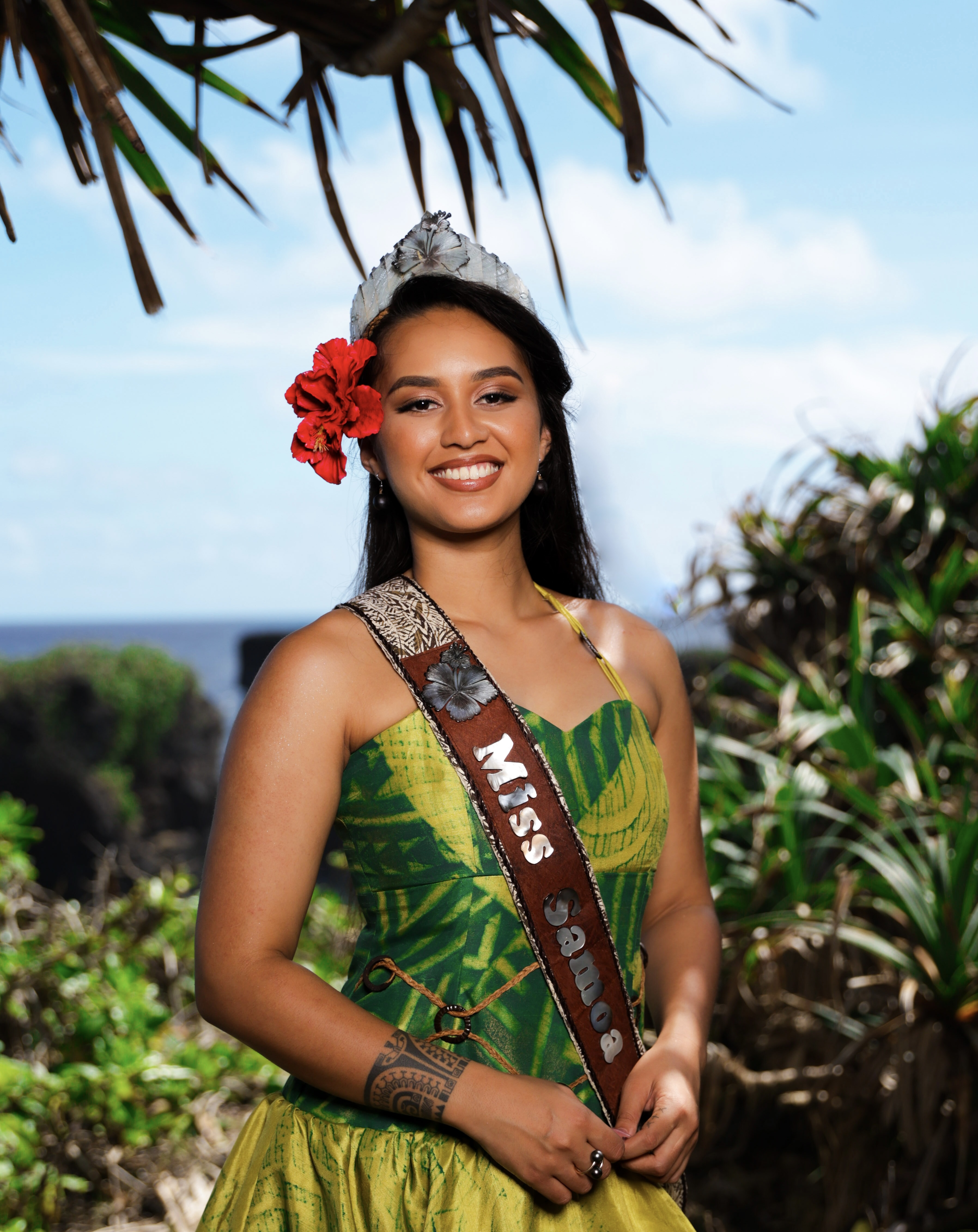
Moemoana Safaʻatoʻa Schwenke, Samoa candidate at Miss Pacific Islands 2024

Color keys

- : Declared as Miss South Pacific/Miss Pacific Islands Winner
- : Ended as runner-up or Top 5/6 qualification
- : Ended as one of the Finalists
- : Ended as one of the Semi-finalists
- : Ended as special awards winner

Year	Miss Samoa	Miss Pacific Islands Placing	Special Awards
2026	Feagaimaali'i Soti Mapu	2nd Runner Up	
2025	Litara Loma Leilani Ieremia-Allan	Miss Pacific Islands 2025	2 Special Awards: Miss Photogenic; Best Interview
2024	Moemoana Safa’ato’a Schwenke	Miss Pacific Islands 2024	4 Special Awards: Best Traditional Wear; Best Interview; Best Talent; People's Choice Award
2023	Haylani Pearl Mataupu Kuruppu	1st Runner Up	1 Special Awards: Best Sarong
2019	Fonoifafo McFarland-Seumanu	Miss Pacific Islands 2019	2 Special Awards: Best Traditional Wear; Best Interview
2018	Sonia Piva	2nd runner-up	2 Special Awards: Best Sarong; Traditional Inspired Wear
2017	Alexandra Iakopo	1st runner-up	4 Special Awards: Miss Personality; Best in Talent; Miss Internet; Best Interview
2016	Priscilla Olano	3rd runner-up	1 Special Awards: Miss Personality
2015	Ariana Taufao	1st runner-up	1 Special Awards: Best Presentation & Stage Interview
2014	Latafale Auva'a	Miss Pacific Islands 2014	4 Special Awards: Best Traditional Wear; Best Sarong; Best Talent; Best Interview
2013	Susana Fanueli	2nd runner-up	2 Special Awards: Miss Internet; Miss Photogenic
2012	Janine Nicky Tuivaiti	Miss South Pacific 2012	3 Special Awards: Best Traditional Wear; Best Talent; Miss Photogenic
2011	Olevia Ioane	unplaced	
2010	Jolivette Menime Ete	2nd runner-up	1 Special Awards: Miss Internet
2009	Tusisaleia Hope Pomele (Resigned)	4th runner-up	
2009	Tavalea Nilon	did not compete	
2009	Jacinta Bourne (Resigned)	did not compete	
2008	Gwendolyn Tuaitanu	1st runner-up	2 Special Awards: Best Talent; Miss Internet
2007	Sherry Natalie Elekana	2nd runner-up	1 Special Awards: Miss Internet
2006	Poinsettia Taefu	1st runner-up	3 Special Awards: Best Sarong; Miss National Tourism; Best Interview
2005	Falute Sauvao Vaauli	2nd runner-up	1 Special Awards: Best Traditional Wear
2004	Saifaleupolu Tamasese	unplaced	
2003	Punipuao Cilla Brown	2nd runner-up	
2002	Anita Jamieson	3rd runner-up	1 Special Awards: Best Talent
2001	Manamea Apelu	Miss South Pacific 2001	6 Special Awards: Best Talent; Miss Internet; Best Sash Award; Best Coconut Award; Miss Photogenic; Best Float
2000	Petra Suhren	1st runner-up	1 Special Awards: Best Traditional Wear
1999	Taralina Gae'e	3rd runner-up	2 Special Awards: Best Coconut Award; Miss National Tourism
1998	Cheri Moana Robinson	Miss South Pacific 1998	1 Special Awards: Best Talent
1997	Mary-Jane Moe Mckibbin	Miss South Pacific 1997	1 Special Awards: * Best Talent
1996	Verona Ah Ching	Miss South Pacific 1996	1 Special Awards: Best Talent
1995	Marie Enosa	unplaced	2 Special Awards: best Traditional Wear; Miss Photogenic
1994	Liliolevao Malietoa	1st runner-up	
1993	Yolande Mareta Craig	4th runner-up	
1992	Soloia Meleisea	unknown	
1991	Sina Greevy	unknown	
1990	Tapa’au Folasa Samoa	unknown	
1989	Ainslie Fitisemanu	unknown	
1988	Tualagi Keil	unknown	
1987	Ursula Elizabeth Curry	unknown	
1968	Tuifeamalo Schaafhausen	Did Not Compete	

== Samoa Pageants Representatives ==
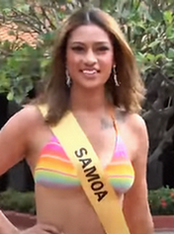
Renee Logova, Samoa candidate at Miss Grand International 2014

List of Samoan women who have represented Samoa during International and Regional Pageants.

Color keys

- : Declared as Winner
- : Ended as runner-up or Top 5/6 qualification
- : Ended as one of the Finalists
- : Ended as one of the Semi-finalists
- : Ended as special awards winner

Year	Name	International Pageant	Placement	Special Awards
2026	Farani Faalagilagi	Miss Global	Unplaced	
2025	Nikolina Ah Kuoi	Miss Global	Top 20	
2024	Anna-Li Pisa Tanuvasa Chou-Lee	Miss Earth	Unplaced	
2024	Haylani Pearl Mataupu Kuruppu	Miss Universe	Unplaced	
2023	Haylani Pearl Mataupu Kuruppu	Miss Global	1st Runner-Up	
2023	Tashana Opelu	Face of Beauty International	Top 15	2nd Runner-Up - Teen Face of Beauty International
2019	Alalamalae Lata	Miss World	Unplaced	
2019	Rosevellaryn Brown Fane	Miss Tourism World	Unplaced	
2018	Thelma Fetu	Miss South Pacific Plus Australia	Winner	
2018	Rebecca Sam Yung	Miss Earth	Unplaced	
2018	Sally Moe	Miss Pageant Of The World	Unplaced	
2018	Cyprian Fruean-Posesione	Lady of Brilliancy International Pageant	Unplaced	
2017	Olivia Howman	Miss Earth	Unplaced	
2017	Cyprian Fruean-Posesione	Mrs Worldwide	Unplaced	
2016	Josephine Mafoa	Face of Beauty International	Unplaced	Save the Mazaalai Award
2015	Latafale Auva'a	Miss World	Unplaced	Winner - Dances Of The World; 4th Runner-Up - Miss World Talent; Top 5 - Miss World Sports; Top 10 - Beauty With A Purpose
2015	Tayla Jane Scanlan	Face of Beauty International	Unplaced	
2014	Sophia Pilia’e-Smith	Miss Tourism Planet	Winner	
2014	Danielle Lelo	Miss World	Unplaced	
2014	Renee Logova	Miss Grand International	Unplaced	
2014	Natasha Westropp	Miss Earth	Unplaced	
2014	Evelyn Vaigalu	Face of Beauty International	Unplaced	
2013	Penina Maree Paeu	Miss World	Unplaced	
2011	Helen Talipeau	Supermodel of Asia Pacific 2011	Unplaced	
2010	Danielle Lelo	Miss Intercontinental	Top 15	
2010	Faaselega Oloapu	Miss Earth	Unplaced	
2009	Varuna Curry	Miss Earth	Unplaced	
2006	Mililani Vienna Tofa	Miss Earth	Unplaced	Best National Costume
2005	Josephine Elena Bernadette Meisake	Miss Earth	Unplaced	
1988	Noanoa Hill	Miss World	Unplaced	
1987	Ainslie Berking	Miss World	Unplaced	
1986	Kasileta Joan Gabriel	Miss World	Unplaced	
1986	Tu'iamanu'ula Kaye Hunt	Miss Universe	Unplaced	
1985	Angelie Achatz	Miss World	Unplaced	
1985	Tracey Mihaljevich	Miss Universe	Unplaced	
1984	Ana Bentley	Miss World	Unplaced	
1984	Lena Slade	Miss Universe	Unplaced	
1983	Theresa Thomsen	Miss World	Unplaced	
1983	Falute Mama Aluni	Miss Universe	Unplaced	
1982	Lilly Caroline Hunt	Miss World	Unplaced	
1982	Ivy Warner	Miss Universe	Unplaced	
1981	Juliana Curry	Miss World	Unplaced	
1981	Lenita Marianne Schwalger	Miss Universe	Unplaced	
1980	Liliu Tapuai	Miss World	Unplaced	
1979	Danira Leilani Schwalger	Miss World	Unplaced	
1978	Rosalina Sapolu	Miss World	Unplaced	
1978	Palepa "Elva" Sio Tauiliili	Miss Universe	Unplaced	
1977	Ana Decima Schmidt	Miss World	Unplaced	
1977	Virginia Caroline Suka	Miss Universe	Unplaced	
1976	Taliilani Ellen Letuli	Miss Universe	Unplaced	
1976	Darlene Jean Schwenke	Miss Intercontinental	Unplaced	Best National Costume
1975	Darlene Jean Schwenke	Miss Universe	Unplaced	
1977	Anna Schmidt			
