= Latafale Auva'a =

Samoan-New Zealand beauty pageant titleholder

- Born: Alofa Dawn Latafale Auva'a; 8 June 1993 (age 33); Papakura, New Zealand
- Education: University of Otago
- Occupation: Lawyer
- Beauty pageant titleholder
- Title: Miss Samoa 2014; Miss Samoa New Zealand 2014; Miss Pacific Islands 2014; Miss World Samoa 2015
- Hair color: Light brown
- Eye color: Hazel
- Major competitions: Miss World 2015 (unplaced); Miss Universe New Zealand 2018 (unplaced)

Galumalemana Alofa Dawn Latafale Auva'a (born 8 June 1993) is a Samoan-New Zealand beauty pageant titleholder. She is the first woman to hold four Pacific regional titles by winning Miss Samoa New Zealand 2014, Miss Samoa 2014, Miss Pacific Islands 2014 and Miss World Samoa 2015.

== Early life ==
Auva'a was born in Papakura, New Zealand, to a Samoan father and English mother. She was educated at St Cuthbert's College and King's College, Auckland, where she was deputy head girl and received the University of Auckland's Top Pacific Chancellor Award. Auva'a opted to study law and music at the University of Otago. After graduation she pursued a career in the new Zealand public service.

She competed at the 2015 Pacific Games in Port Moresby, representing Samoa in the mixed touch-rugby team, which won a gold medal.

== Pageant career ==
In August 2014 she won Miss Samoa NZ. In September 2014 she won Miss Samoa. As a result, she had to move to samoa for a year and put her studies on hold. In December 2014 she won the first Miss Pacific Islands pageant in Apia. In 2015 she competed at the Miss World pageant in Sanya, China. During the competition she performed a haka and sang "Let It Go" from the film Frozen in 25 different languages.

== Personal life ==
In 2018, Auva'a was bestowed a Samoan chief (Matai) title at a ceremony in Vaitele, Samoa. She is also a barrister and solicitor in New Zealand.
