= Ailava Samuels =

Beauty queen

- Born: 2007 (age 18–19); Suva, Fiji

Ailava Samuels is a Fijian pageant titleholder who was crowned Miss Pacific Islands 2026 becoming the fourth Fijian to win the title. Prior to this, Ailava won her local town pageant Miss Nasinu 2025 and placed first runner up at Miss Fiji 2025. Ailava was later appointed as Fiji's representative to Miss Pacific Islands 2026.

== Biography ==
Samuels was born in Suva, Fiji and grew up in Nasinu town on the outskirts of Suva. She is of Samoan descent from her Dad's side through the village of Siumu in Upolu and Fijian descent from her Mom's side. She attended St Joseph's Secondary School, Fiji.

== Pageantry ==
=== Miss Nasinu ===
Samuels represented her suburb of Valelevu, and was later crowned Miss Nasinu 2025 at the Vodafone Nasinu Festival in October 2025. Her advocacys focused on community, specifically targeting the disruption of unrealistic beauty standards in Fiji.

=== Miss Fiji ===
Samuels represented Nasinu and was crowned the first runner-up at the Miss Fiji 2025 pageant, which was held in December 2025 at the Suva Civic Center. She scooped two awards which were Best Traditional Attire and Miss Photogenic. Dr. Peggy Ravusiro of Labasa was crowned as the winner.

=== Miss Pacific Islands ===
Following the inability of the reigning Miss Fiji, Dr. Peggy Ravusiro, to formalize her participation, the Miss Fiji Secretariat appointed first runner-up Ailava Samuels to represent Fiji at the Miss Pacific Islands Pageant 2026. Despite rounds of negotiation, Ravusiro declined to sign the contract, citing concerns regarding last-minute demands, safety, and a lack of indemnity, leading the committee to select 19-year-old Samuels to ensure Fiji's participation in the Nadi-based event.

The appointment of Ailava Samuels was surrounded by significant controversy, with the Fiji Government initially intervening to request that the original winner, Ravusiro, be reinstated in accordance with public funding agreements. The situation was further marred by accusations from Ravusiro regarding alleged body-shaming and bullying by the pageant committee, while public backlash and online negativity targeted Samuels following her appointment, prompting discussions on the need for better contestant protection.

Despite the tumultuous build-up, Ailava Samuels was crowned Miss Pacific Islands 2026 on February 14, 2026, in Nadi, becoming the fourth Fijian to win the regional title. Samuels, who also won the Best Interview award, overcame the intense scrutiny and online bullying to emerge victorious, dedicating her win to her supporters and family, and marking a major, emotional comeback for the host nation.
