= Prerna Lal =

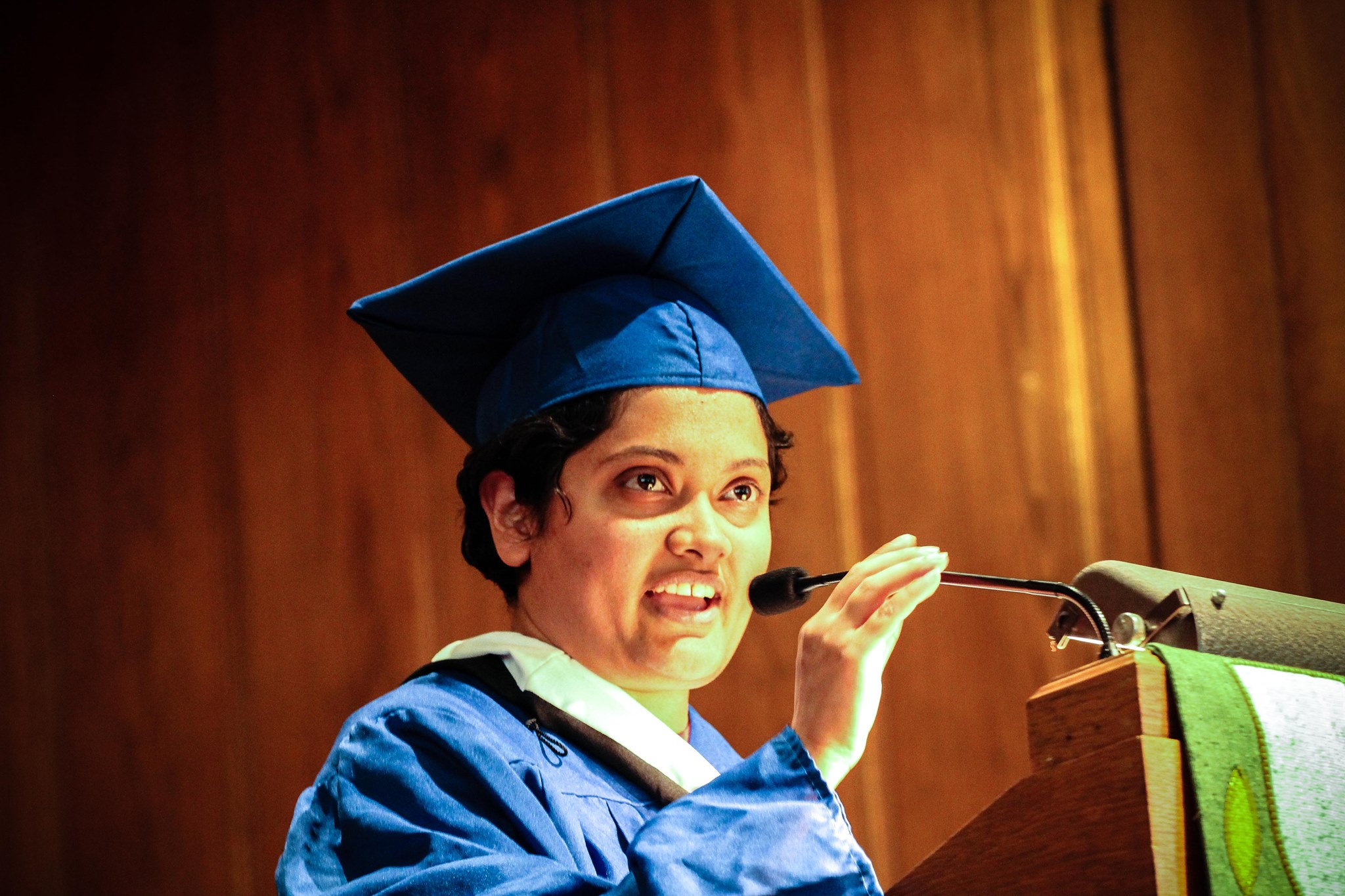
- Prerna Lal delivering a keynote address at a graduation in Washington D.C., 2012
- Born: December 14, 1984 (age 41); Lautoka, Fiji
- Occupation: Activist

Prerna Lal (born 14 December 1984) is a United States citizen, born and raised in Fiji Islands with roots in the San Francisco Bay Area. Lal is a founder of DreamActivist, an online advocacy network led by undocumented youth. Through the use of social media, they have been credited for organising an online network to stop the deportations of undocumented youth and they are well known as one of the pivotal figures and leaders of the DREAM Act movement. A former clinical law professor, Lal is a frequent writer on immigration, racial justice, sexual orientation, and how these forces intersect. Lal is a graduate of The George Washington University Law School, and works as an immigration attorney.

== Early life and education ==
Prerna Lal was born on 14 December 1984 in Lautoka, Fiji. Growing up, Lal attended Nehru Memorial Primary School and St Joseph's Secondary School, Fiji. When the government of Fiji was overthrown in a militant coup in 2000, Lal's family decided to emigrate to the United States. The Lal family applied for lawful permanent resident status through Lal's US citizen grandmother but that process took over a decade and in the meanwhile, Lal fell out of status and became an undocumented immigrant in the United States. Lal attended Hayward High School in Hayward, California and graduated with the class of 2002. Because Lal was an undocumented student, they did not qualify for federal financial aid or loans to attend colleges. Lal's family established a cleaning business and Lal worked long hours to attend Chabot College, a community college, near home. In 2005, Lal obtained a Bachelor of Arts in political science from California State University, East Bay. Having limited career options as an undocumented immigrant, they continued their schooling at San Francisco State University where they obtained a Masters in International Relations. Lal matriculated at The George Washington University Law School in 2010, and graduated in 2013.

== Career ==
Lal became active in the DREAM Act movement in 2008 and 2009, as a founder and Communications Director of DreamActivist and served on the Steering Committee of United We DREAM. They were among the first undocumented students to share their story publicly and speak openly about their immigration status in the media. Through the use of social media, Lal helped build DreamActivist and United We DREAM into a nationwide network of undocumented youth who organised to push for the DREAM Act and ushered in a new age of community-led deportation defense. By combining story-telling, legal advocacy, lobbying and social media as organising tactics, Lal effectively helped to stop the deportations of dozens of undocumented immigrants. While the DREAM Act failed to pass the Senate in 2010, Lal's organisation continued to push for executive action to stop the deportations of undocumented youth, and was rewarded when President Obama announced the Deferred Action for Childhood Arrivals program in 2012.

Despite being undocumented, Lal matriculated at George Washington University Law School in the fall of 2010. They worked at several D.C. area law firms, and received merit and need-based scholarships from both the school and immigration advocacy organisations to fund their education. Lal graduated from law school in 2013, becoming the first undocumented graduate from the George Washington University Law School. At a special awards ceremony, they received the Justice Thurgood Marshall Distinguished Accomplishment Award in Civil Rights and Civil Liberties for their immigration and LGBT work. Lal was also licensed and sworn into the bar of the District of Columbia while they had no immigration status.

Lal is a writer and prolific social media architect who has received attention for their immigrant rights and LGBT activism. In 2011, the South Asian Americans Leading Together (SAALT), honoured Lal with a Changemaker Award on the 10th anniversary of 9–11, for their leadership role in the undocumented youth movement. In 2013, Fusion listed them as among the "Top 20 Immigration Experts to Follow on Twitter" while Colorlines showcased their in "Here's 15 Smart Women of Color on Twitter." In 2016, Bustle named Lal as one of the 27 activists to follow on Twitter.

Lal has also been recognized as one of the pivotal undocuqueer leaders in the United States on numerous occasions. They also served as a board director of Immigration Equality, an organisation focusing on policy, advocacy and direct legal services for LGBT immigrants, at a pivotal moment in US LGBT history, as marriage equality became the law during their leadership. Most recently, Lal served on the board of the Astraea Lesbian Foundation for Justice, the only philanthropic organization working to advance LGBT human rights worldwide.

In 2014, Lal became a staff attorney at Advancing Justice | AAJC, in Washington D.C., focusing on immigration enforcement matters, and spearheaded successful campaigns to establish parole for the family members of Filipino war veterans as well as TPS for Nepal. In 2015, Lal joined the UC Berkeley Undocumented Student Program project as an Immigration Attorney, in partnership with the East Bay Community Law Center (EBCLC). In under three years, they built a successful legal services delivery model for the university from the ground-up with a support staff of four people. In January 2018, Lal secured the release from immigration detention of Luis Mora, a UC Berkeley student who had become the subject of a high-profile deportation case. After facing what appeared to many as retaliation for speaking out against the university's questionable support of undocumented students, Lal decided to leave UC Berkeley and start their own law practice, Lal Legal APLC.

== Removal proceedings ==
Lal was placed in deportation proceedings in 2011 after the USCIS deemed that Lal had aged-out of a green-card application filed on their behalf by their US citizen grandmother and lawful permanent resident mother. Many also viewed this as an attempt to silence Lal's advocacy for immigrant rights, and organised a campaign on Lal's behalf. Despite the setback, Lal fought the removal proceedings, contending that the Child Status Protection Act allowed Lal to keep their place in line and adjust status to that of a green-card holder, and the Ninth Circuit Court of Appeals issued a decision in their favour. After a groundswell of public pressure and outcry from the same network of supporters that Lal had helped to create, the Department of Homeland Security offered to drop proceedings. Lal later married their US citizen partner, Lindsay Schubiner, at the National DREAM graduation. Lal and Schubiner publicized their wedding as a celebration of the recent US Supreme Court decision to strike down the Defense of Marriage Act, thus allowing the executive branch of the federal government to recognize the marriages of same-sex couples for immigration purposes. Lal became a lawful permanent resident in 2014, and a U.S. citizen in 2018.

== Works and publications ==
Non Fiction

- Lal, Prerna (2019). Unsung America: Immigrant Trailblazers and Our Fight for Freedom. Florida: Mango Publishing. ISBN 978-1-64250-112-4.
