= Shireen Lateef =

Fijian women's rights activist

Shireen Rexina Lateef was a Fijian women's rights activist, known for her work on gender equality at the Asian Development Bank.

== Biography ==
Shireen Lateef was born in Fiji and was of Indo-Fijian descent. After studying at St. Joseph's Secondary School in Fiji, she traveled to Australia to pursue higher education. She attended Monash University, graduating with a Ph.D. in social anthropology and education, which included significant fieldwork among Indo-Fijian women in the Fijian capital, Suva. She then spent nine years as a lecturer at the University of Melbourne.

Lateef was a longtime gender equality activist, considered an inspiration behind the feminist movement in Fiji. In 1990, while at Melbourne, she published "Rule by the Danda: Domestic Violence Among Indo-Fijians," which is considered one of the earliest studies of domestic violence in Fiji and a seminal work of feminist research in the country.

In 1992, she began working as a junior gender specialist at the Asian Development Bank in Manila. Among her work at the ADB, she is best known as the architect of the bank's Policy on Gender and Development, which guided its efforts to support equality for women. Over 23 years at the bank, she pushed for the organization to recognize how development projects can impact women in often overlooked ways.

Lateef retired from the ADB in 2015, having reached the title of senior adviser on gender. She died the following year on February 11 in Brisbane, Australia, after a long illness.
