= Moemoana Safaʻatoʻa Schwenke =

Cultural and environmental advocate

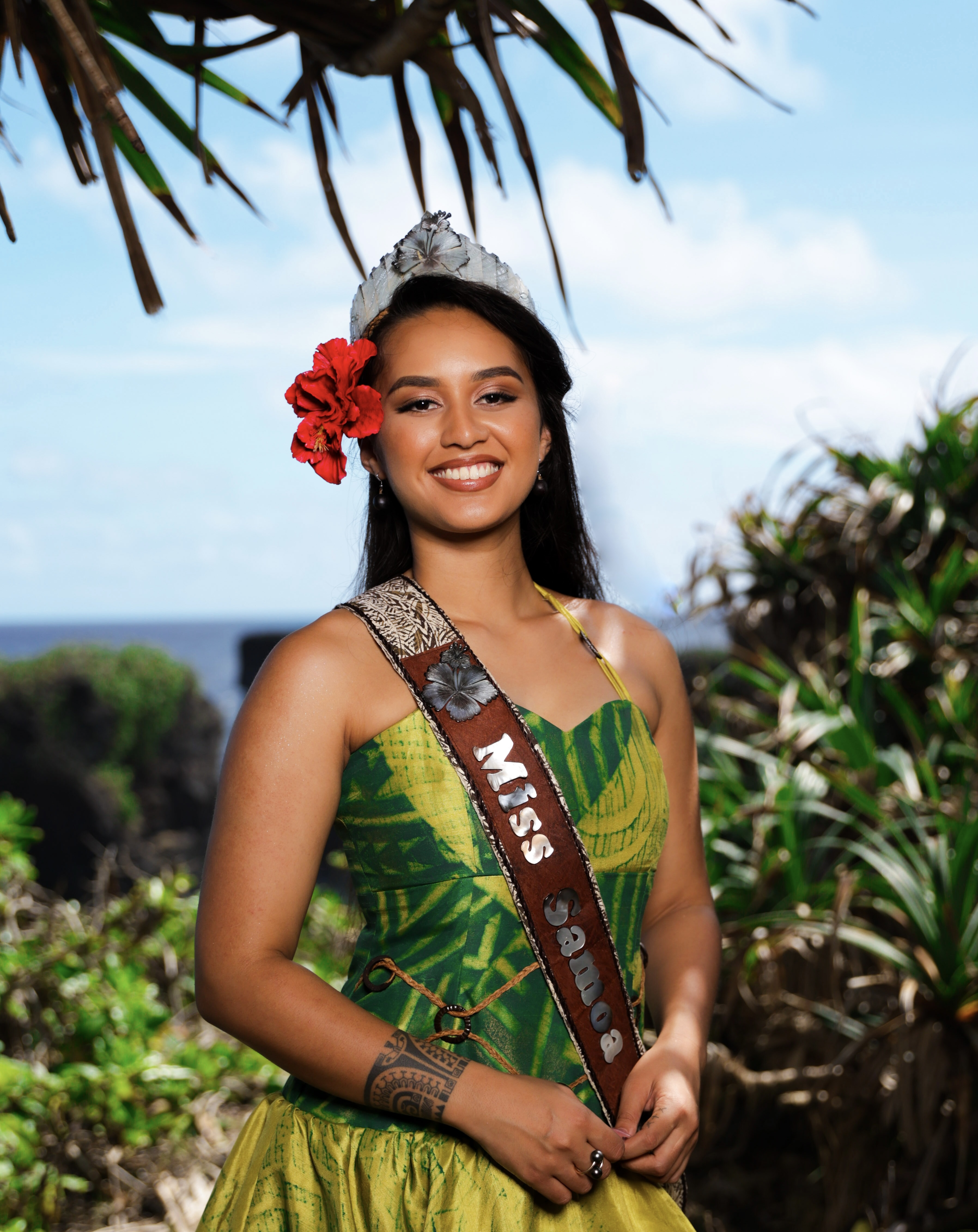
- Moemoana Safaʻatoʻa Schwenke, representing Samoa in her role as Miss Samoa.
- Born: 1 September 2000 (age 25); Apia, Samoa
- Education: University of Wollongong (Bachelor of Arts in Indigenous Studies and Environmental Humanities)
- Occupations: Performing Artist, Cultural and Environment Advocate, Pageant Titleholder
- Years active: 2022–present
- Title: Miss Samoa and Miss Pacific Islands 2023-2024, UNICEF Pacific Regional Ambassador

Moemoana Safaʻatoʻa Schwenke (born 1 September 2000) is a Samoan cultural leader, youth advocate and environmental campaigner. She works to promote Pacific heritage, youth empowerment and climate action. She is a former Miss Samoa and Miss Pacific Islands 2023-2024, and current UNICEF Pacific Regional Ambassador.

== Early life and education ==
Moemoana was born in Samoa and raised across Samoa, New Zealand, and Australia. She reconnected with her Samoan heritage through community programs in Western Sydney.

== Career and advocacy ==
She is the founder and director of the Tā Fesilafa’i Initiative, which engages young people in Samoa through arts-based programs addressing climate change, gender equity, and leadership. She has served as a cultural consultant for the Samoan Ministry of Women, Community & Social Development, leading projects such as the Samoan Women Warriors documentary.

Moemoana has represented Pacific communities at international events including COP26 and COP28 and participated in the Commonwealth Heads of Government Meeting (CHOGM) Samoa Youth, Women, and Peoples Forums. She currently serves as UNICEF Pacific Regional Ambassador, supporting early childhood development initiatives and amplifying youth voices across the Pacific.

== Pageantry ==
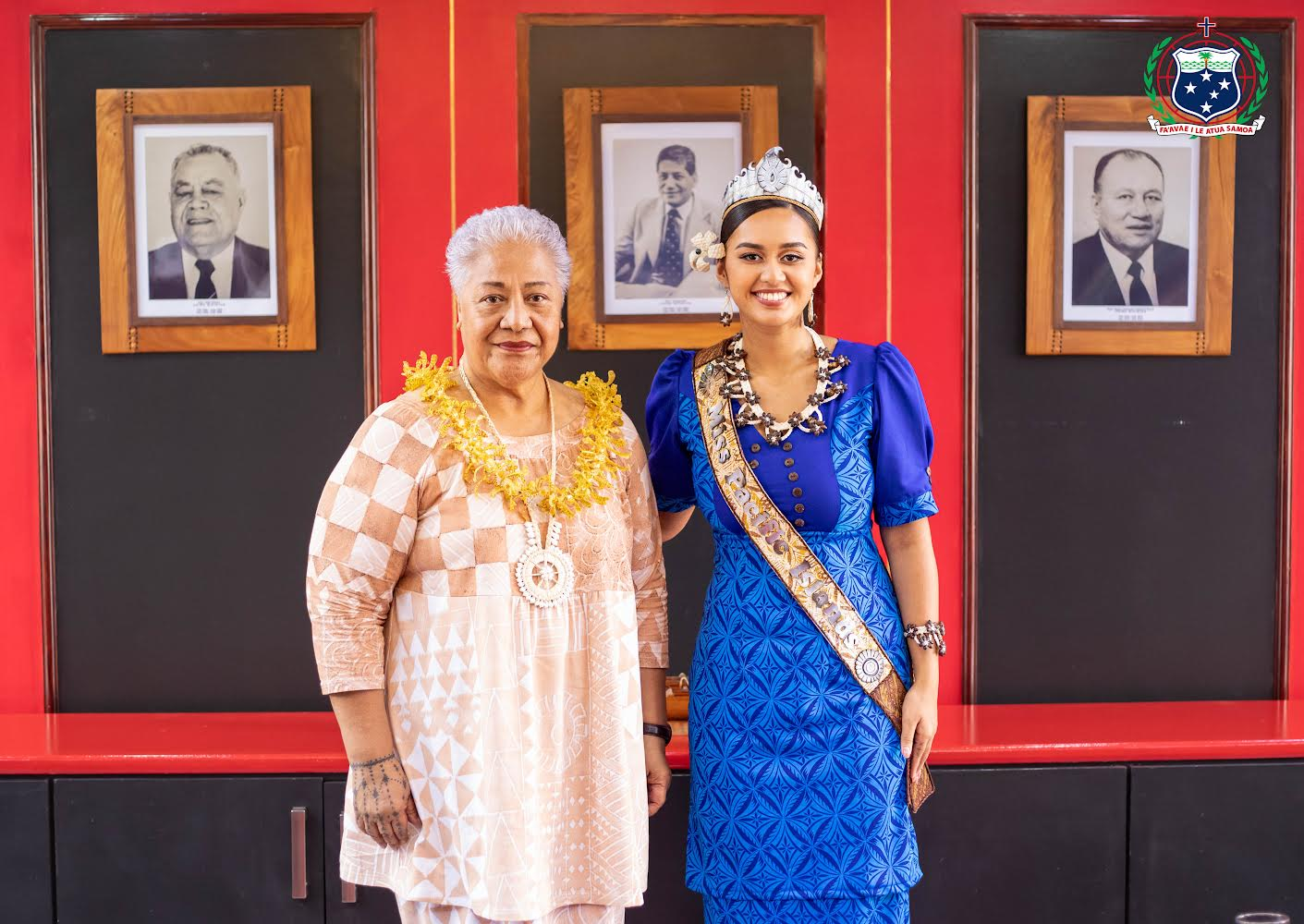
Prime Minister of Samoa Fiame Naomi Mata'afa with Miss Pacific Islands 2024

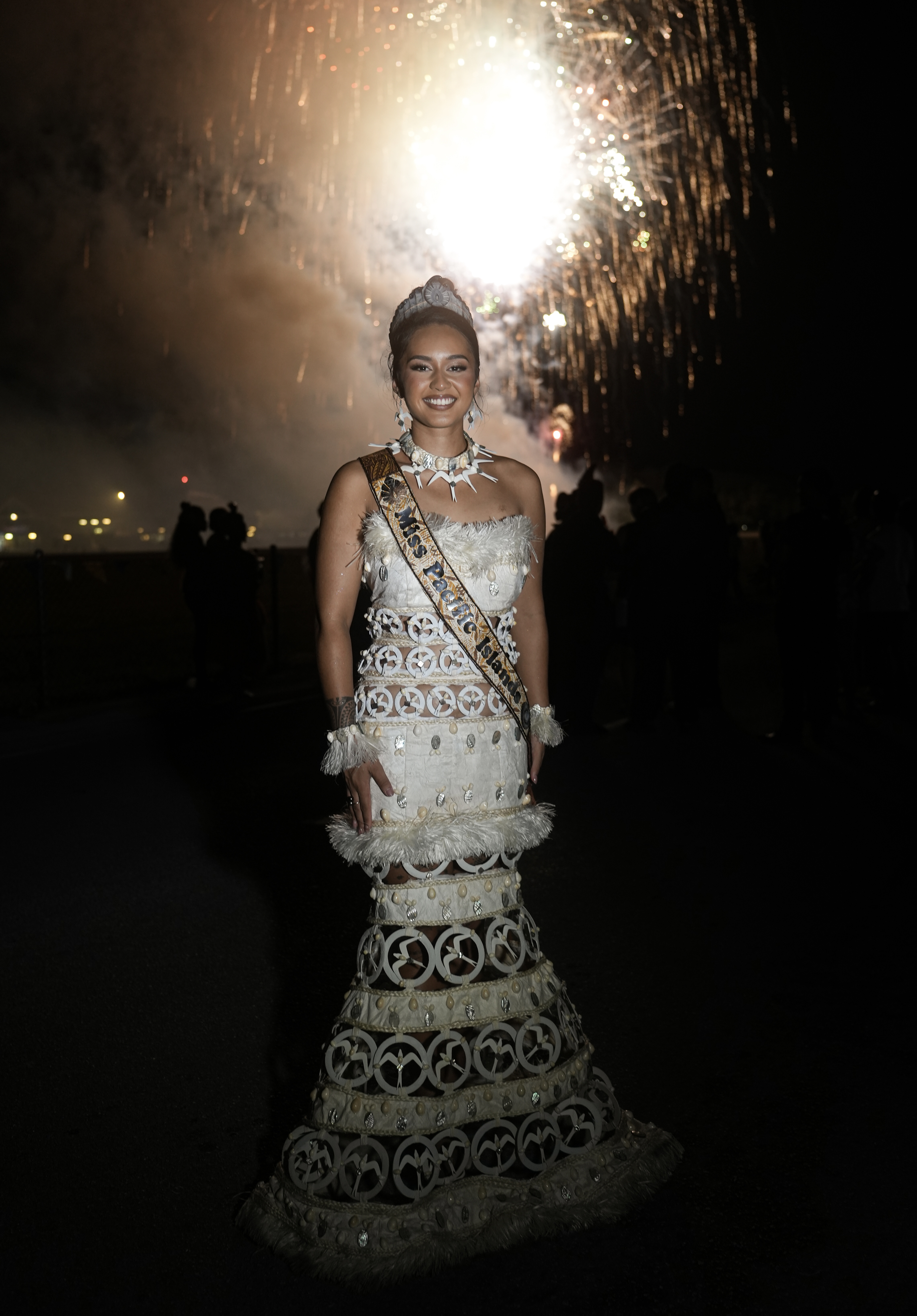
Miss Pacific Islands 2024 Moemoana Schwenke

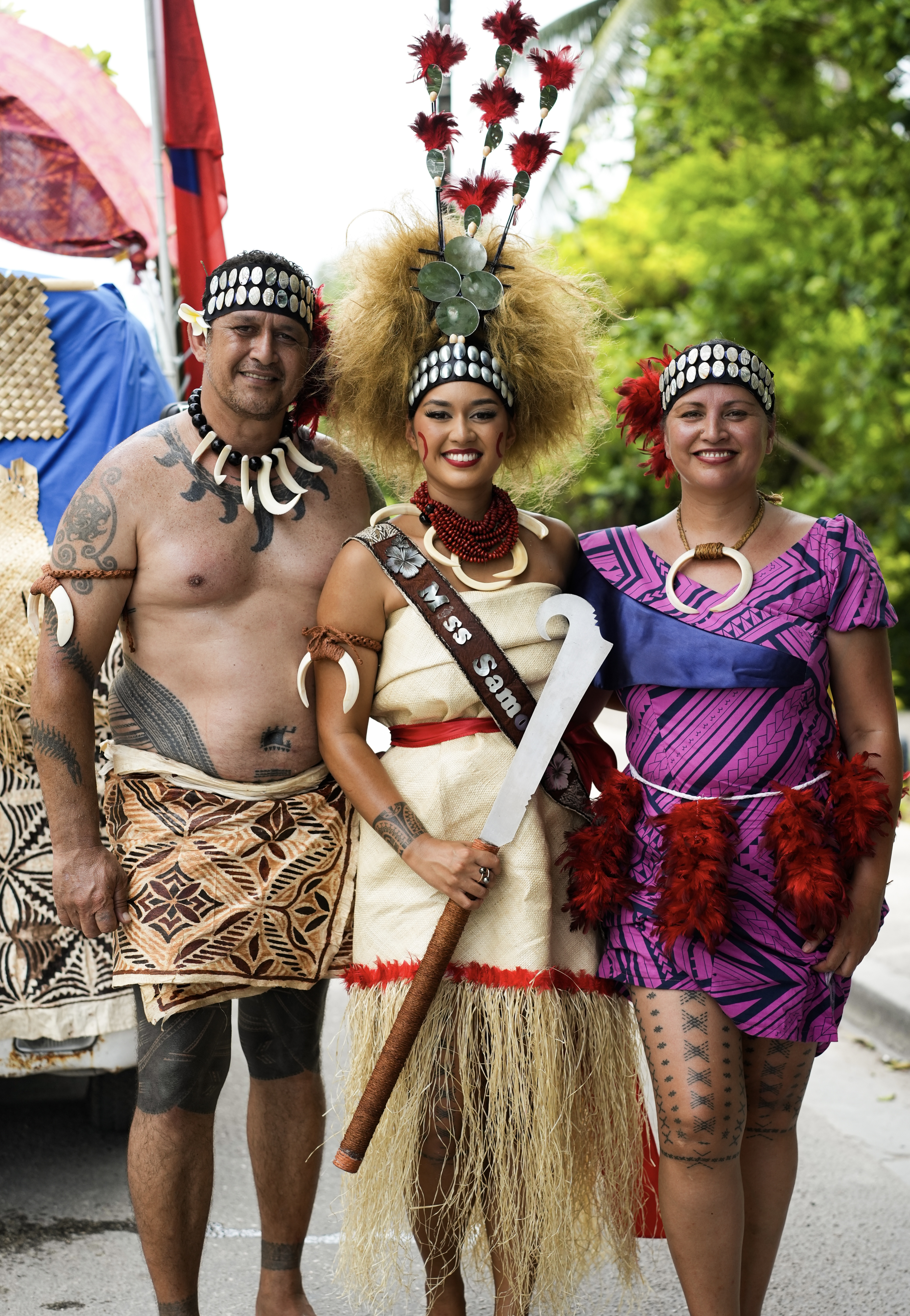
Moemoana and Parents Maryjane and Fred Schwenke

She has held the titles of Miss Samoa and Miss Pacific Islands, providing platforms for advocacy on cultural preservation, environmental awareness, and youth empowerment.

== Cultural work and arts ==
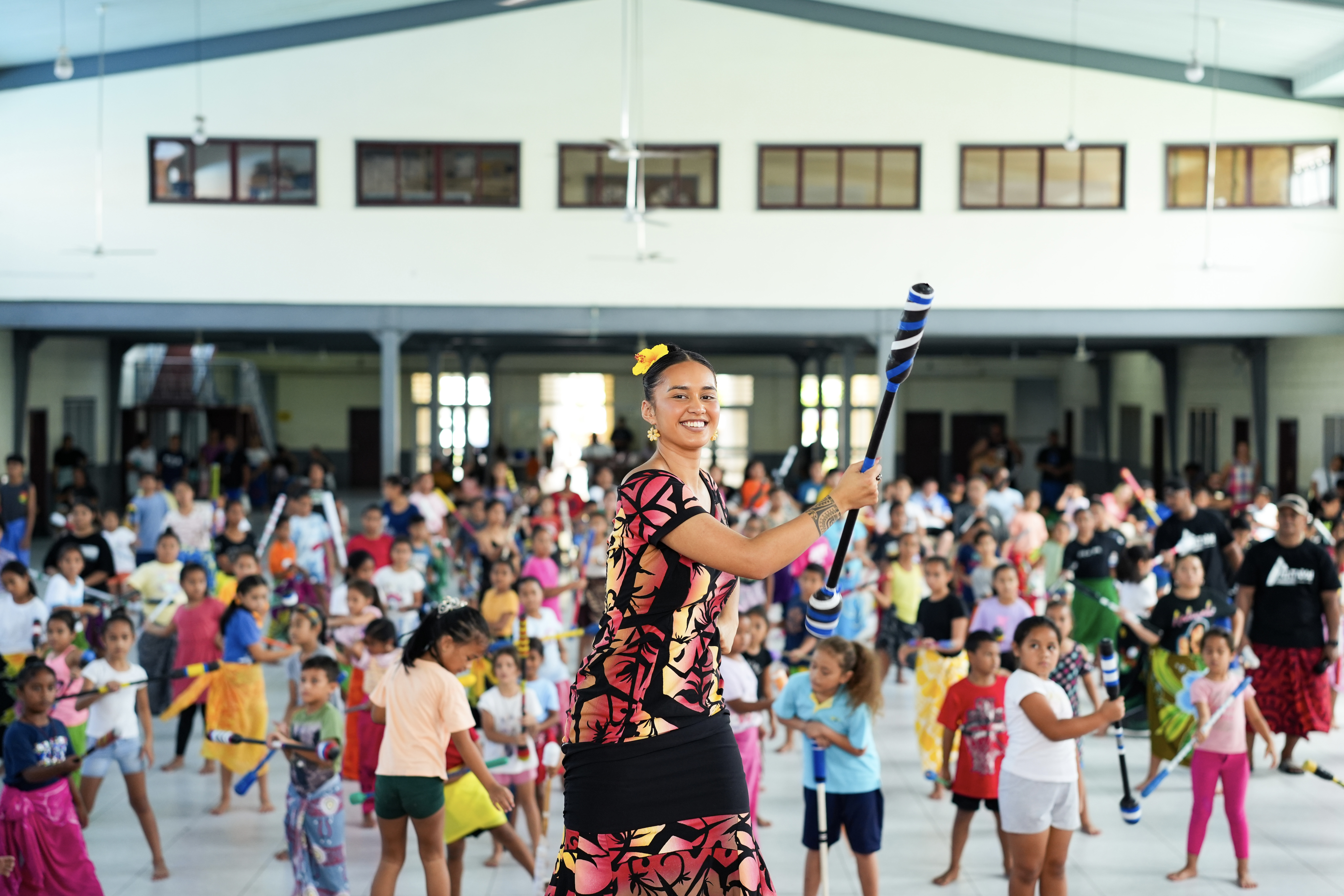
Moemoana leading Ta Fesilafai with the Youth of Samoa

Moemoana has worked with Matavai Pacific Cultural Arts as a mentor and performer, facilitating cultural exchange and leadership workshops. She co-wrote and directed Motu of Western Sydney, a theatre production involving over 120 performers, and is directing the Samoan short film Fetuilelagi, which explores culture, identity, and environmental awareness.

== Recognition ==
She has collaborated with international organisations including UNICEF Pacific, UN Women, UNDP, the Pacific Islands Forum Secretariat (PIFS), the Pacific Community (SPC), and the South Pacific Tourism Organization (SPTO).
