= Miss Pacific Islands =

Beauty pageant in the Pacific Islands

- Type: Regional women's beauty pageant
- Headquarters: Apia, Samoa
- First edition: 1987
- Most recent edition: 2025
- Current titleholder: Ailava Samuels; Miss Fiji
- Owners: Government of Samoa
- Language: English
- Website: www.misspacificislands.org

Miss Pacific Islands is a regional beauty pageant held in the Pacific Islands. It was known as the Miss South Pacific Pageant until its name change in 2014. The current reigning Miss Pacific Islands is Miss Fiji Ailava Samuels who was crowned on 14 February 2026 in Nadi, Fiji

== History ==
The Miss South Pacific Pageant was established in 1987 by the Government of Samoa as a regional event to recognize and promote the attributes, intelligence, and talents of Pacific Island women. The pageant recognizes Pacific Island women, their contributions to regional affairs, and their ability to advance in diverse fields.

The first Miss South Pacific Pageant, hosted by the Government of Western Samoa, was held in 1987. Miss American Samoa, Juliet Spencer, was crowned the Miss South Pacific. Until 2000, the Miss South Pacific Pageant allowed South Pacific Islanders to represent their homeland communities even though they lived abroad. For example, Miss Samoa New Zealand represented the Samoan community in New Zealand, and Miss Papua New Guinea Australia represented the PNG community in Australia. In 2001, contestants wishing to represent their homeland communities abroad had to compete in their homeland pageants first in order to participate in the Miss South Pacific Pageant. In 2014, the pageant was renamed Miss Pacific Islands in order to represent the whole Pacific region instead of just the South Pacific.

The pageant for 2020 was cancelled due to the COVID-19 pandemic and was postponed until 2023.

== Title holders ==
Year	Miss Pacific Islands (1st place)	1st runner-up (2nd place)	2nd runner-up (3rd place)	3rd runner-up (4th place)	4th runner-up (5th place)	5th runner-up (6th place)	Host country/territory	Entrants
2026	Ailava Samuels; Fiji	Iampela Popena; Papua New Guinea	Feagaimaalii Soti Mapu; Samoa	Siosiana Taumoepeau; Tonga	Petra Matina Mataiti; Cook Islands	Not awarded	Fiji	7
2025	Litara Loma Leilani Ieremia-Allan; Samoa	Racheal Angelica 'O Manakakapu Guttenbeil; Tonga	Pauliana Felise-Vitale; American Samoa	Elsie Camelyn Salumata Polosovai; Solomon Islands	Ngatepaeru Marie Maoate; Cook Islands	Not awarded	Solomon Islands	8
2024	Moemoana Safa’ato’a Schwenke; Samoa	Tyla Singirok; Papua New Guinea	Rosita Rokobuli; Nauru	Claret Taonang ChongGum; Marshall Islands	Judy Fa'afetai Taunuu; American Samoa	Not awarded	Nauru	7
2023	Josie Nicholas; Papua New Guinea	Haylani Pearl Mataupu Kuruppu; Samoa	Kauhani Mea'alofa Teisa Fuimaono; American Samoa	Not awarded	Not awarded	Not awarded	Samoa	5
2019	Fonoifafo Nancy McFarland-Seumanu; Samoa	Gladys Habu; Solomon Islands	Lucy Maino; Papua New Guinea	Herevai Hoata; Tahiti	Yehenara Soukop; Tonga	Not awarded	Papua New Guinea	12
2018	Leoshina Mercy Kariha; Papua New Guinea	Lydia Simonis-Tariu; Cook Islands	Sonia Piva; Samoa	Emelipelesa Panapa; Tuvalu	Not awarded	Not awarded	Tonga	6
2017	Matauaina Gwendolyn To’omalatai; American Samoa	Alexandra Iakopo; Samoa	Hally Qaqa; Fiji	Enerstina Bonsu- Maro; Cook Islands	Tiare Pakarati; Rapa Nui	Not awarded	Fiji	9
2016	Anne Dunne; Fiji	Antonina Keka Lilomaiava; American Samoa	Camilla Grossmith; Solomon Islands	Priscilla Olano; Samoa	Tepaeru Helen Toka; Cook Islands	Not awarded	Samoa	8
2015	Abigail Havora; Papua New Guinea	Ariana Taufao; Samoa	Brittne Fuimaono; Tonga	Zaira Begg; Fiji	Deanne Enoch; Solomon Islands	Not awarded	Cook Islands	8
2014	Latafale Auva'a; Samoa	Antonina Browne; Cook Islands	Nanise Noel Regarau Rainima; Fiji	Annelise Fa’aitumalo Sword; American Samoa	Grace Agatha Nugi; Papua New Guinea	Not awarded	Samoa	8
2013	Teuira Napa; Cook Islands	Rosemarie Louise Fili; Tonga	Susana Reti Fanueli; Samoa	Tema Wickham; Solomon Islands	Eleitino Ma’aelopa Tuiasosopo; American Samoa	Not awarded	Solomon Islands	10
2012	Janine Nicky Tuivaiti; Samoa	Kate Ngatokorua; Cook Islands	Drew Slatter; Fiji	Ruby-Anne Laufa; Papua New Guinea	Arrielle La’asaga Tuilefano Maloata; American Samoa	Not awarded	American Samoa	10
2011	Alisi Rabukawaqa; Fiji	Kawena Ka-Malamalama-O-Nalani Souza (Hawaii) Hawaiian Islands	Liberty Hinalei Afeaki; Tonga	Sarah Kila Karo; Papua New Guinea	Uirangi Bishop; Cook Islands	Not awarded	Samoa	9
2010	Joyana Mennie Meyer; Cook Islands	Angela Cudd (New Zealand) Aotearoa	Jolivette Menime Ete; Samoa	Sera Tikotikoivatu; Fiji Islands	Pomaikai Klein; Hawaii	Not awarded	Papua New Guinea	11
2009	Merewalesi Nailatikau; Fiji	Engara Melanie Amanda Gosselin; Cook Islands	Paretaunu Randall (New Zealand) Aotearoa	Millicent Karmeny Barty; Solomon Islands	Tusisaleia Hope Pomele; Samoa	Not awarded	Fiji	10
2008	Vanessa Marsh; Niue	Gwendolyn Pona Tuaitanu; Samoa	Anne-Maire Herman; Cook Islands	Filomena Tuivanualevu; Fiji	Faasilitamaitai Shanette Pualani Tilo; American Samoa	Not awarded	American Samoa	8
2007	Tessi Leila Toluta’u; Tonga	Joyce Lucia Regina Fortes; Cook Islands	Sherry Natalie Elekana; Samoa	Tania Michelle Wieclaw (Australia) Australiana/Torres Strait Island	Wilhelmina Elisapeta Saelua; American Samoa	Not awarded	Samoa	8
2006	Krystina Kauvai; Cook Islands	Poinsettia Mary Seleisa Taefu; Samoa	Charity Apinery Gregory; American Samoa	Sina Uilani Nauahi; Tonga	Aurélie Rollot; New Caledonia	Not awarded	Samoa	7
2005	Dorothea George; Cook Islands	Nancy Maloni; Tonga	Falute Sauvao Vaauli; Samoa	Edweena Talatini; New Caledonia	Faith Toilolo; American Samoa	Not awarded	Tonga	7
2004	Sinahemana Hekau; Niue	Noovai Karen Tylor; Cook Islands	Trixy Theresa Taua; American Samoa	Louiena Ruth Leon Guerrero Pangelinan; Northern Marianas	Marianne Fédronie; New Caledonia	Not awarded	American Samoa	7
2003	Janice Nicholas; Cook Islands	Jessie Moala Philip; Tonga	Punipuao Cilla Brown; Samoa	Olivia Srue Aloka Tebuteb; Northern Marianas	Etelani Atia'e; American Samoa	Sita Simaileta Falefaea Tapumanaia; Tuvalu	Samoa	6
2002	Lupe Ane Kenape Aumavae; American Samoa	Donna Tuara; Cook Islands	Phyllis Ruth Tohi; Tonga	Anita Jamieson; Samoa	Mahealani Reiko Kamau; Hawaii	Not awarded	Cook Islands	7
2001	Manamea Apelu; Samoa	Jamie Unciano; Hawaii	Vitalia Samoata Ann Kline; American Samoa	Christie Marie Rosh'n Nau Fepulea'i; Tonga	Serlinda Soukon; Pohnpei, Micronesia	Rossylyn Arney Pulehetoa; Niue Island	Samoa	6
2000	Helen Afatasi Burke; American Samoa	Petra May Suhren; Samoa	Vaneta April Moegi; Samoa Hawaii	Elaine Robin Ward (New Zealand) Samoa Aotearoa	Jocelyn Keolalaulani Dalire; Hawaii	Not awarded	American Samoa	13
1999	Liana Scott; Cook Islands	Anaseini Papaha’amea Va-‘o Fonoti Taumeopeau Walker; Tonga	Helai Moana Oala; Papua New Guinea	Taralina Ancalin Gae’e; Samoa	Joanne Kakoa Terubea; Fiji	Not awarded	Tonga	11
1998	Cheri Moana Robinson; Samoa	Ranadi Laurel Johnston; Fiji	Simeamativa Peleipu Kruse; American Samoa	Tina Marie Vogel; Cook Islands	Julia Regan (New Zealand) Aotearoa	Not awarded	Samoa	11
1997	MaryJane Moe Mckibbin; Samoa	Letila Mitchell; Fiji	Tepoe Dauphin; Tahiti	Michelle Malulani; Hawaii	Anita Siosi'ana Lavulo Roberts Taumoepeau; Tonga	Not awarded	New Zealand	13
1996	Verona Ah Ching; Western Samoa	Unknown (N/A)	Sovita Mauga; Samoa New Zealand	Not awarded	Not awarded	Not awarded	Samoa	13
1995	Ma'ata Mo'ungaloa; 4 months reign (DETHRONED); Tonga	Rochelle Tuitele; 8 months reign (COMPLETED 1995 REIGN); American Samoa	Maryjane Mckibbin; Samoa Australia	Roxanna Moana Clark; Samoa New Zealand	Victoria Keil; Cook Islands	Not awarded	Tonga	17
1994	Tarita Brown; Cook Islands	Not awarded	Not awarded	Not awarded	Not awarded	Not awarded	Samoa	11
1993	Leilua Stevenson; American Samoa	Lorna Meleisea; Samoa New Zealand	Not awarded	Not awarded	Not awarded	Not awarded	American Samoa	14
1992	Julia Toevai; Samoa New Zealand	Not awarded	Not awarded	Not awarded	Not awarded	Not awarded	Samoa	Unknown
1991	Kimiora Vogel; Cook Islands	Not awarded	Not awarded	Not awarded	Not awarded	Not awarded	Samoa	Unknown
1990	Henari Arauva’a; Tahiti	Not awarded	Not awarded	Not awarded	Not awarded	Not awarded	Cook Islands	Unknown
1989	Retire Chevaux; Tahiti	Not awarded	Not awarded	Not awarded	Not awarded	Not awarded	Samoa	Unknown
1988	Theresa Purcell; Samoa Hawaii	Leimomi Bacalso; Hawaii	Not awarded	Not awarded	Not awarded	Not awarded	Samoa	Unknown
1987	Juliette Caroline Spencer; American Samoa	Not awarded	Not awarded	Not awarded	Not awarded	Not awarded	Samoa	Unknown

== Country/territory by numbers of wins ==
Country/territory	Titles	Year
Samoa	9	1996, 1997, 1998, 2001, 2012, 2014, 2019, 2024, 2025
Cook Islands	8	1991, 1994, 1999, 2003, 2005, 2006, 2010, 2013
American Samoa	6	1987, 1993, 1995, 2000, 2002, 2017
Fiji	4	2009, 2011, 2016, 2026
Papua New Guinea	3	2015, 2018, 2023
Tahiti	2	1989, 1990
Tonga	2	1995, 2007
Niue	2	2004, 2008
Samoa New Zealand	1	1992
Samoa Hawaii	1	1988
Aotearoa/New Zealand	0	
Hawaii	0	
Kiribati	0	
Nauru	0	
New Caledonia	0	
Northern Marianas	0	
Palau	0	
Pohnpei, Micronesia	0	
Rapa Nui/Easter Islands	0	
Solomon Islands	0	
Tokelau	0	
Tuvalu	0	
Vanuatu	0	
Wallis and Futuna	0	

== Back-to-back wins ==
- Tahiti: 1989 - 1990
- Samoa: 1996 - 1997
- Samoa: 1997 - 1998
- Cook Islands: 2005 - 2006
- Samoa: 2024 - 2025

== Winners gallery ==
=== Participating countries ===
- Australiana/Torres Strait Island
- Aotearoa
- Aotearoa New Zealand
- Aotearoa Pacific
- American Samoa
- Cook Islands
- Cook Islands New Zealand
- Fiji
- Fiji Islands
- French Polynesia
- Hawaii
- Hawaiian Islands
- Kiribati
- Nauru
- New Caledonia
- New Zealand
- Niue
- Niue Island
- Niue New Zealand
- Northern Marianas
- Palau
- Papua New Guinea
- Papua New Guinea Australia
- Papua New Guinea Pacific Islands
- Pohnpei, Micronesia
- Rapa Nui
- Samoa
- Samoa Australia
- Samoa Aotearoa
- Samoa Aotearoa New Zealand
- Samoa Hawaii
- Samoa New Zealand
- Samoa San Francisco
- Solomon Islands
- Tahiti
- Tuvalu
- Tonga
- Tonga Australia
- Tokelau
- Vanuatu
- Wallis and Futuna
- Western Samoa

== List of contestants ==
Miss Pacific Islands 2026
Pageant Venue	Sofitel Fiji Resort & Spa, Denarau Island, Nadi, Fiji
Pageant Location	Fiji
Pageant Date	13 & 14 February 2026
Pageant Edition	37th Edition
Number of Candidates	7
Placement	Contestant
Miss Pacific Islands 2026	Fiji - Ailava Samuels
1st Runner-Up	Papua New Guinea - Iampela Popena
2nd Runner-Up	Samoa - Feagaimaalii Soti Mapu
3rd Runner Up	Tonga - Siosiana Taumoepeau
4th Runner-Up	Cook Islands - Petra Matina Mataiti
Award	Contestant
Best Traditional Wear	Papua New Guinea - Iampela Popena
Miss Photogenic	Cook Islands - Petra Matina Mataiti
Best Sarong	Tonga - Siosiana Taumoepeau
Miss Personality	Kiribati - Atinterentaai Rinimarawa
Best Interview	Fiji - Ailava Samuels
Best Talent	Cook Islands - Petra Matina Mataiti
Miss Internet	Papua New Guinea - Iampela Popena
Miss Tourism Award	Tonga - Siosiana Taumoepeau
Country/Territory	Contestant
Kiribati	Atinterentaai Rinimarawa
Tonga	Siosiana Taumoepeau
Samoa	Feagaimaali'i Soti Mapu
American Samoa	Tofoipūpū Unutoa
Fiji	Ailava Samuels
Cook Islands	Petra Matina Mataiti
Papua New Guinea	Iampela Popena

Miss Pacific Islands 2027
Pageant Venue	
Pageant Location	
Pageant Date	
Pageant Edition	38th
Number of Candidates	
Placement	Contestant
Miss Pacific Islands 2027	
1st Runner-Up	
2nd Runner-Up	
3rd Runner-Up	
4th Runner-Up	
Award	Contestant
Best Traditional Wear	
Miss Photogenic	
Miss Personality	
Best Interview	
Best Talent	
Best Sarong	
People's Choice Award	
National Tourism Award	
Country/Territory	Contestant

Miss Pacific Islands 2028
Pageant Venue	
Pageant Location	
Pageant Date	
Pageant Edition	39th Edition
Number of Candidates	
Placement	Contestant
Miss Pacific Islands 2028	
1st Runner-Up	
2nd Runner-Up	
3rd Runner-Up	
4th Runner-Up	
Award	Contestant
Best Traditional Wear	
Miss Photogenic	
Miss Personality	
Best Interview	
Best Talent	
Best Sarong	
People's Choice Award	
National Tourism Award	
Country/Territory	Contestant

Miss Pacific Islands 2023
Pageant Venue	Tuanaimato Sports Complex, Apia, Samoa
Pageant Location	Samoa
Pageant Date	3 February 2023
Pageant Edition	34th Edition
Number of Candidates	5 Candidates
Placement	Contestant
Miss Pacific Islands 2023	Papua New Guinea – Josie Nicholas
1st Runner-Up	Samoa – Haylani Pearl Kuruppu
2nd Runner-Up	American Samoa – Kauhani Mea’alofa Teisa Fuimaono
Award	Contestant
Best Traditional Wear	American Samoa – Kauhani Mea’alofa Teisa Fuimaono
Miss Photogenic	American Samoa – Kauhani Mea’alofa Teisa Fuimaono
Best Sarong	Samoa – Haylani Pearl Kuruppu
Miss Personality	Nauru − Alexandra Melody Pitcher
Best Interview	Solomon Islands − Tiare Haro
Best Talent	Papua New Guinea – Josie Nicholas
People's Choice Award	Papua New Guinea – Josie Nicholas
National Tourism Award	Solomon Islands − Tiare Haro
Country/Territory	Contestant
American Samoa	Kauhani Mea’alofa Teisa Fuimaono
Nauru	Alexandra Melody Pitcher
Solomon Islands	Tiare Haro
Papua New Guinea	Josie Nicholas
Samoa	Haylani Pearl Kuruppu

Miss Pacific Islands 2024
Pageant Venue	Sports Centre, Republic of Nauru
Pageant Location	Nauru
Pageant Date	4 February 2024
Pageant Edition	35th Edition
Number of Candidates	7 Candidates
Placement	Contestant
Miss Pacific Islands 2024	Samoa – Moemoana Safa'ato'a Schwenke
1st Runner-Up	Papua New Guinea – Tyla Singirok
2nd Runner-Up	Nauru – Rosita Rokobuli
3rd Runner-Up	Marshall Islands – Claret Taonang ChongGum
4th Runner-Up	American Samoa – Judy Fa'afetai Taunuu
Award	Contestant
Best Traditional Wear	Samoa – Moemoana Safa'ato'a Schwenke
Miss Photogenic	Nauru – Rosita Rokobuli
Miss Personality	Tonga – Sitita Hamilton Vaenuku
Best Interview	Samoa – Moemoana Safa'ato'a Schwenke
Best Talent	Samoa – Moemoana Safa'ato'a Schwenke
Best Sarong	Papua New Guinea – Tyla Singirok
People's Choice Award	Samoa – Moemoana Safa'ato'a Schwenke
National Tourism Award	American Samoa – Judy Fa'afetai Taunuu
Country/Territory	Contestant
American Samoa	Judy Fa'afetai Taunuu
Nauru	Rosita Rokobuli
Marshall Islands	Claret Taonang ChongGum
Palau	Dee-Raya Antonia
Papua New Guinea	Tyla Singirok
Samoa	Moemoana Safa'ato'a Schwenke
Tonga	Sitita Hamilton Vaenuku

Miss Pacific Islands 2025
Pageant Venue	Friendship Hall, Honiara, Solomon Islands
Pageant Location	Solomon Islands
Pageant Date	8 February 2025
Pageant Edition	36th Edition
Number of Candidates	8 Candidates
Placement	Contestant
Miss Pacific Islands 2025	Samoa - Litara Loma Leilani Ieremia-Allan
1st Runner-Up	Tonga - Racheal Guttenbeil
2nd Runner-Up	American Samoa - Pauliana Felise-Vitale
3rd Runner-Up	Solomon Islands - Elsie Polosovai
4th Runner-Up	Cook Islands - Ngatepaeru Maoate
Award	Contestant
Best Traditional Wear	Tonga - Racheal Guttenbeil
Miss Photogenic	Samoa - Litara Loma Leilani Ieremia-Allan
Miss Personality	American Samoa - Pauliana Felise-Vitale
Best Interview	Samoa - Litara Loma Leilani Ieremia-Allan
Best Talent	American Samoa - Pauliana Felise-Vitale
Best Sarong	Papua New Guinea - May Torowi Hasola
People's Choice Award	Tonga - Racheal Guttenbeil
National Tourism Award	American Samoa - Pauliana Felise-Vitale
Country/Territory	Contestant
Samoa	Litara Loma Leilani Ieremia-Allan
Nauru	Charlei Andriana Deiye
American Samoa	Pauliana Felise-Vitale
Papua New Guinea	May Torowi Hasola
Solomon Islands	Elsie Polosovai
Kiribati	Kimberly Tokanang
Cook Islands	Ngatepaeru Maoate
Tonga	Racheal Guttenbeil

Miss Pacific Islands 2017
Pageant Venue	Prince Charles Park, Nadi, Fiji
Pageant Location	Fiji
Pageant Date	2017 December 9
Pageant Edition	31st Edition
Number of Candidates	10 Candidates
Placement	Contestant
Miss Pacific Islands 2017	American Samoa − Matauaina Gwendolyn To’omalatai
1st Runner-Up	Samoa − Alexandra Iakopo
2nd Runner-Up	Fiji − Halley Qaqa
3rd Runner-Up	Cook Islands − Enerstina Pokuil Bonsu-Maro
4th Runner-Up	Rapa Nui − Tiare Pakarati
Award	Contestant
Best Traditional Wear	American Samoa − Matauaina Gwendolyn To’omalatai
Best Talent	Samoa − Alexandra Iakopo
Miss Internet	Samoa − Alexandra Iakopo
Miss Personality	Samoa − Alexandra Iakopo
Miss Photogenic	American Samoa − Matauaina Gwendolyn To’omalatai
Miss Tourism	American Samoa − Matauaina Gwendolyn To’omalatai
Best Interview	Samoa − Alexandra Iakopo
Country/Territory	Contestant
American Samoa	Matauaina Gwendolyn To’omalatai
Cook Islands	Enerstina Pokuil Bonsu-Maro
Fiji	Halley Qaqa
Nauru	Angelique Tansy Itsimaera
Papua New Guinea Pacific Islands	Niawali Anastasia Twain
Rapa Nui	Tiare Pakarati
Samoa	Alexandra Iakopo
Solomon Islands	Miss Emily Chan
Tonga	Ophelia Kitiliti Kava

Miss Pacific Islands 2018
Pageant Venue	Atele Indoor Stadium, Tonga
Pageant Location	Tonga
Pageant Date	2018 December 1
Pageant Edition	32nd Edition
Number of Candidates	6 Candidates
Placement	Contestant
Miss Pacific Islands 2018	Papua New Guinea − Leoshina Mercy Kariha
1st Runner-Up	Cook Islands − Enerstina Pokula Bonsu-Maro
2nd Runner-Up	Samoa − Sonia Piva
3rd Runner-Up	Tuvalu − Emeli Pelesa Panapa
Award	Contestant
Best Sarong	Samoa - Sonia Piva
Traditional Inspired Wear	Samoa - Sonia Piva
Best Talent	Papua New Guinea − Leoshina Mercy Kariha
Miss Internet	Cook Islands − Enerstina Pokula Bonsu-Maro
Miss Personality	Papua New Guinea − Leoshina Mercy Kariha
Miss Photogenic	Cook Islands − Enerstina Pokula Bonsu-Maro
Miss Tourism	Papua New Guinea − Leoshina Mercy Kariha
Best Research Topic	Papua New Guinea − Leoshina Mercy Kariha
Country/Territory	Contestant
American Samoa	Magalita Filomena Johnson
Cook Islands	Enerstina Pokula Bonsu-Maro
Papua New Guinea	Leoshina Mercy Kariha
Samoa	Sonia Piva
Tuvalu	Emeli Pelesa Panapa
Tonga	Ophelia Kitillti Kava

Miss Pacific Islands 2019
Pageant Venue	The Stanley Hotel Suites in Port Moresby, Papua New Guinea
Pageant Location	Papua New Guinea
Pageant Date	2019 November 30
Pageant Edition	33rd Edition
Number of Candidates	12 Candidates
Placement	Contestant
Miss Pacific Islands 2019	Samoa − Fonoifafo Nancy McFarland-Seumanu
1st Runner-Up	Solomon Islands − Gladys Habu
2nd Runner-Up	Papua New Guinea − Lucy Maino
3rd Runner-Up	Tahiti − Herevai Hoata
4th Runner-Up	Tonga − Yehenara Soukop
Award	Contestant
Best Traditional Wear	Samoa − Fonoifafo Nancy McFarland-Seumanu
Best Sarong	Papua New Guinea − Lucy Maino
Best Talent	Solomon Islands − Gladys Habu
People's Choice	Marshall Islands − Billma Peter
Miss Personality	Tonga − Yehenara Soukop
Miss Photogenic	Marshall Islands − Billma Peter
National Tourism Award	American Samoa − Epifania Petelo
Best Interview	Samoa − Fonoifafo Nancy McFarland-Seumanu
Country/Territory	Contestant
American Samoa	Epifania Petelo
Cook Islands	Terito-o-Ngakura Story
Fiji	Jessica Fong
Nauru	Millenia Finch
Marshall Islands	Billma Peter
Papua New Guinea	Lucy Maino
Samoa	Fonoifafo Nancy McFarland-Seumanu
Solomon Islands	Gladys Habu
Tahiti	Herevai Hoata
Tuvalu	Tapua Pasuna
Tonga	Yehenara Soukop
Wallis and Futuna	Violene Blondel

Miss Pacific Islands 2014
Pageant Venue	Tuanaimato Sports Complex, Apia, Samoa
Pageant Location	Samoa
Pageant Date	2014 December 19
Pageant Edition	28th Edition
Number of Candidates	8 Candidates
Placement	Contestant
Miss Pacific Islands 2014	Samoa − Latafale Auva’a
1st Runner-Up	Cook Islands − Antonina Browne
2nd Runner-Up	Fiji − Nanise Noel Regarau Rainima
3rd Runner-Up	American Samoa − Annelise Fa’aitumalo Sword
4th Runner-Up	Papua New Guinea − Grace Agatha Nugi
Award	Contestant
Best Traditional Wear	Samoa − Latafale Auva’a
Best Sarong	Samoa − Latafale Auva’a
Best Talent	Samoa − Latafale Auva’a
Miss Internet	Nauru − Kauai Margreta Oppenheimer
Miss Personality	Niue − Nina Erika Misionini Nemaia
Miss Photogenic	Fiji − Nanise Noel Regarau Rainima
Miss National Tourism	American Samoa − Annelise Fa’aitumalo Sword
Best Interview	Samoa − Latafale Auva’a
Country/Territory	Contestant
American Samoa	Annelise Fa’aitumalo Sword
Cook Islands	Antonina Browne
Fiji	Nanise Noel Regarau Rainima
Nauru	Kauai Margreta Oppenheimer
Niue	Nina Erika Misionini Nemaia
Papua New Guinea	Grace Agatha Nugi
Samoa	Latafale Auva’a
Tonga	Cassandra Ngaluafe

Miss Pacific Islands 2015
Pageant Venue	The National Auditorium in Rarotonga, Cook Islands
Pageant Location	Cook Islands
Pageant Date	12 December 2015
Pageant Edition	29th Edition
Number of Candidates	8 Candidates
Placement	Contestant
Miss Pacific Islands 2015	Papua New Guinea − Abigail Havora
1st Runner-Up	Samoa − Ariana Taufao
2nd Runner-Up	Tonga − Brittne Fuimaono
3rd Runner-Up	Fiji − Zaira Begg
4th Runner-Up	Solomon Islands − Deanne Enoch
Award	Contestant
Best Sarong	Papua New Guinea − Abigail Havora
Best Talent	Papua New Guinea − Abigail Havora
Best traditionally inspired outfit	Fiji − Zaira Begg
Miss Social Media	Tonga − Brittne Fuimaono
Miss Photogenic	Tonga − Brittne Fuimaono
Miss Personality	American Samoa − Suluga Taliau
Tourism Award	American Samoa − Suluga Taliau
Best Presentation & Stage Interview	Samoa − Ariana Taufao
Country/Territory	Contestant
American Samoa	Suluga Taliau
Cook Islands	Felicia George
Fiji	Zaira Begg
Niue	Elaine Karena
Papua New Guinea	Abigail Havora
Samoa	Ariana Taufao
Solomon Islands	Deanne Enoch
Tonga	Brittne Fuimaono

Miss Pacific Islands 2016
Pageant Venue	Gym 1, Tuanaimato, Apia, Samoa
Pageant Location	Samoa
Pageant Date	2016 December 2
Pageant Edition	30th Edition
Number of Candidates	8 Candidates
Placement	Contestant
Miss Pacific Islands 2016	Fiji − Anne Christine Dunn
1st Runner-Up	American Samoa − Antonina Keka Lilomalava
2nd Runner-Up	Solomon Islands − Camilla Grossmith
3rd Runner-Up	Samoa − Prisilla Olano
4th Runner-Up	Cook Islands − Tepaeru Helen Toka
Award	Contestant
Best Traditional Wear	Fiji − Anne Christine Dunn
Best Sarong	American Samoa − Antonina Keka Lilomalava
Best Talent	Solomon Islands − Camilla Grossmith
Miss Internet	Nauru − Lucina Detsiogo
Miss Personality	Samoa − Prisilla Olano
Miss Photogenic	Tonga − Laura Melala Renae Lauti
Miss National Tourism	American Samoa − Antonina Keka Lilomalava
Best Interview	Fiji − Anne Christine Dunn
Country/Territory	Contestant
American Samoa	Antonina Keka Lilomalava
Cook Islands	Tepaeru Helen Toka
Fiji	Anne Christine Dunn
Nauru	Lucina Detsiogo
Papua New Guinea	Marie-Lisa Limbiye
Samoa	Prisilla Olano
Solomon Islands	Camilla Grossmith
Tonga	Laura Melala Renae Lauti

Miss South Pacific 2011
Pageant Venue	EFKS Youth Hall, Apia, Samoa
Pageant Location	Samoa
Pageant Date	2011 December 10
Pageant Edition	25th Edition
Number of Candidates	9 Candidates
Placement	Contestant
Miss South Pacific 2011	Fiji − Alisi Rabukawaqa
1st Runner-Up	Hawaiian Islands − Kawena Ka-Malamalama-O-Nalani Souza
2nd Runner-Up	Tonga − Liberty Hinalei Afeaki
3rd Runner-Up	Papua New Guinea − Sarah Kila Karo
4th Runner-Up	Cook Islands − Uirangi Bishop
Award	Contestant
Best Traditional Wear	Fiji − Alisi Rabukawaqa
Best Sarong	Hawaiian Islands − Kawena Ka-Malamalama-O-Nalani Souza
Best Talent	Cook Islands − Uirangi Bishop
Miss Internet	Papua New Guinea − Sarah Kila Karo
Miss Personality (Congeniality)	Tonga − Liberty Hinalei Afeaki
Miss Photogenic	Hawaiian Islands − Kawena Ka-Malamalama-O-Nalani Souza
Miss National Tourism	Tonga − Liberty Hinalei Afeaki
Best Interview	Fiji − Alisi Rabukawaqa
Country/Territory	Contestant
American Samoa	Skyline Ese’ese Ah Soon Nua
Cook Islands	Uirangi Bishop
Fiji	Alisi Rabukawaqa
Hawaiian Islands	Kawena Ka-Malamalama-O-Nalani Souza
Papua New Guinea	Sarah Kila Karo
Samoa	Olevia Ioane
Solomon Islands	Simaema Mili Marie Nielsen
Tokelau	Siniva Sauaga Foua
Tonga	Liberty Hinalei Afeaki

Miss South Pacific 2012
Pageant Venue	Rex H Lee Auditorium, Utulei, American Samoa
Pageant Date	2012 December 8
Pageant Edition	26th Edition
Number of Candidates	10 Candidates
Placement	Contestant
Miss South Pacific 2012	Samoa − Janine Tuivaiti
1st Runner-Up	Cook Islands − Kate Ngatokorua
2nd Runner-Up	Fiji − Drew Slatter
3rd Runner-Up	Papua New Guinea − Ruby-Anne Laufa
4th Runner-Up	American Samoa − Arrielle La’asaga Tuilefano Maloata
Award	Contestant
Best Traditional Wear	Samoa − Janine Tuivaiti
Best Sarong	Papua New Guinea − Ruby-Anne Laufa
Best Talent	Samoa − Janine Tuivaiti
Miss Internet	American Samoa − Arrielle La’asaga Tuilefano Maloata
Miss Personality	Hawaiian Islands − Joy Euese Saleapaga
Miss Photogenic	Samoa − Janine Tuivaiti
Miss National Tourism	Papua New Guinea − Ruby-Anne Laufa
Country/Territory	Contestant
Aotearoa	Marlena Martin
American Samoa	Arrielle La’asaga Tuilefano Maloata
Cook Islands	Kate Ngatokorua
Fiji	Drew Slatter
Hawaiian Islands	Joy Euese Saleapaga
Papua New Guinea	Ruby-Anne Laufa
Samoa	Janine Tuivaiti
Solomon Islands	Stephanie Prince
Tokelau	Peki Teata
Tonga	Ebony Nuku

Miss South Pacific 2013
Pageant Venue	Pacific Casino Hotel, Honiara, Solomon Islands
Pageant Location	Solomon Islands
Pageant Date	2013 December 7
Pageant Edition	27th Edition
Number of Candidates	10 Candidates
Placement	Contestant
Miss South Pacific 2013	Cook Islands − Teuira Raechel Napa
1st Runner-Up	Tonga − Rosemarie Louise Fili
2nd Runner-Up	Samoa − Susana Reti Fanueli
3rd Runner-Up	Solomon Islands − Tema Wickham
4th Runner-Up	American Samoa − Eleitino Ma’aelopa Tuiasosopo
Award	Contestant
Best Traditional Wear	Cook Islands − Teuira Raechel Napa
Best Sarong	Cook Islands − Teuira Raechel Napa
Best Talent	Solomon Islands − Tema Wickham
Miss Internet	Samoa − Susana Reti Fanueli
Miss Personality	Tonga − Rosemarie Louise Fili
Miss Photogenic	Samoa − Susana Reti Fanueli
Miss National Tourism	American Samoa − Eleitino Ma’aelopa Tuiasosopo
Best Interview	Tonga − Rosemarie Louise Fili
Country/Territory	Contestant
American Samoa	Eleitino Ma’aelopa Tuiasosopo
Cook Islands	Teuira Raechel Napa
Fiji	Priscilla Preetika Reddy
Hawaiian Islands	Alesha Uluwehi Malaea Makuakane
Papua New Guinea	Christine Kaupa Aiwa
Samoa	Susana Reti Fanueli
Solomon Islands	Tema Wickham
Tonga	Rosemarie Louise Fili
Tokelau	Hela Tauhehe Teao
Vanuatu	Valérie Martinez

Miss South Pacific 2008
Pageant Venue	H. Rex Lee Auditorium, Utulei, American Samoa
Pageant Location	American Samoa
Pageant Date	2008 October 24
Pageant Edition	22nd Edition
Number of Candidates	8 Candidates
Placement	Contestant
Miss South Pacific 2008	Niue − Vanessa Toriana Tracey Limatoa Marsh
1st Runner-Up	Samoa − Gwendolyn Pona Tuaitanu
2nd Runner-Up	Cook Islands − Anne-Maire Herman
3rd Runner-Up	Fiji − Filomena Tuivanualevu
4th Runner-Up	American Samoa − Faasilitamaitai Shanette Pualani Tilo
Award	Contestant
Best Traditional Wear	Unknown − Unknown
Best Sarong	Niue - Vanessa Toriana Tracey Limatoa Marsh
Best Talent	Samoa - Gwendolyn Pona Tuaitanu
Miss Internet	Samoa − Gwendolyn Pona Tuaitanu
Miss Personality	Unknown − Unknown
Miss Photogenic	Niue − Vanessa Toriana Tracey Limatoa Marsh
Miss National Tourism	Unknown − Unknown
Miss Charity	Fiji − Filomena Tuivanualevu
Country/Territory	Contestant
Aotearoa Pacific	Shani Talia Matenga Troughear
American Samoa	Faasilitamaitai Shanette Pualani Tilo
Cook Islands	Anne-Maire Herman
Fiji	Filomena Tuivanualevu
Niue	Vanessa Toriana Tracey Limatoa Marsh
Samoa	Gwendolyn Pona Tuaitanu
Tokelau	Joanne O'Brien
Tonga	Fiona Hoanne Olivar Loloma Makis

Miss South Pacific 2009
Pageant Venue	Albert Park, Suva, Fiji
Pageant Location	Fiji
Pageant Date	2009 November 29
Pageant Edition	23rd Edition
Number of Candidates	12 Candidates
Placement	Contestant
Miss South Pacific 2009	Fiji − Merewalesi Nailatikau
1st Runner-Up	Cook Islands − Engara Melanie Amanda Gosselin
2nd Runner-Up	Aotearoa New Zealand − Paretaunu Randall
3rd Runner-Up	Solomon Islands − Millicent Karmeny Barty
4th Runner-Up	Samoa − Tusisaleia Hope Pomele
Award	Contestant
Best Traditional Wear	Fiji − Merewalesi Nailatikau
Best Sarong	Cook Islands − Engara Melanie Amanda Gosselin
Best Talent	Fiji − Merewalesi Nailatikau
Miss Internet	Papua New Guinea − Antonia Singut
Miss Personality	American Samoa − Lorisa Mata’utia
Miss Photogenic	American Samoa − Lorisa Mata’utia
Miss National Tourism	French Polynesia − Lorisa Mata’utia
Best Interview	Fiji − Merewalesi Nailatikau
Miss Elegance	Tonga −
Country/Territory	Contestant
Aotearoa New Zealand	Paretaunu Randall
American Samoa	Lorisa Mata’utia
Cook Islands	Engara Melanie Amanda Gosselin
Fiji	Merewalesi Nailatikau
French Polynesia	Aruhoia Marine Biret
Kiribati	Taumiri Tetuai
Niue	C Lavini
Papua New Guinea	Antonia Singut
Samoa	Tusisaleia Hope Pomele
Solomon Islands	Millicent Karmeny Barty
Tuvalu	Paea ‘Okusitina Williams
Tonga	Akelita Marisa Pesega

Miss South Pacific 2010
Pageant Venue	Sir John Guise Indoor Sports Complex, Port Moresby, Papua New Guinea
Pageant Location	Papua New Guinea
Pageant Date	2010 November 27
Pageant Edition	24th Edition
Number of Candidates	11 Candidates
Placement	Contestant
Miss South Pacific 2010	Cook Islands − Joyana Mennie Meyer
1st Runner-Up	Aotearoa New Zealand − Angela Cudd
2nd Runner-Up	Samoa − Jolivette Menime Ete
3rd Runner-Up	Fiji Islands − Sera Tikotikoivatu
4th Runner-Up	Hawaii − Pomaikai Klein
Award	Contestant
Best Traditional Wear	Tonga − Mafi Tuinukuafe
Best Sarong	Cook Islands − Joyana Mennie Meyer
Best Talent	Cook Islands − Joyana Mennie Meyer
Miss Internet	Samoa − Jolivette Menime Ete
Miss Personality	Tonga − Mafi Tuinukuafe
Miss Photogenic	Cook Islands − Joyana Mennie Meyer
Miss National Tourism	Aotearoa New Zealand − Angela Cudd
Best Interview	Hawaii − Pomaikai Klein
Country/Territory	Contestant
Aotearoa New Zealand	Angela Cudd
American Samoa	Cindy Fonofili Silao
Cook Islands	Joyana Mennie Meyer
Fiji Islands	Sera Tikotikoivatu
Hawaii	Pomaikai Klein
Niue Island	Maria Mitimeti
Papua New Guinea	Rachel Sapery James
Solomon Islands	Fuatino Malasa
Samoa	Jolivette Menime Ete
Tokelau	Meleka Mativa
Tonga	Mafi Tuinukuafe

Miss South Pacific 2005
Pageant Venue	Queen Salote Memorial Hall, Nuku’alofa, Tonga
Pageant Location	Tonga
Pageant Date	2005 November 11
Pageant Edition	19th Edition
Number of Candidates	7 Candidates
Placement	Contestant
Miss South Pacific 2005	Cook Islands − Dorothea Ngapoko Puretu George
1st Runner-Up	Tonga − Nancy Maloni
2nd Runner-Up	Samoa − Falute Sauvao Vaauli
3rd Runner-Up	New Caledonia − Edweena Talatini
4th Runner-Up	American Samoa − Faith Toilolo
Award	Contestant
Best Traditional Wear	Samoa − Falute Sauvao Vaauli
Best Sarong	Cook Islands − Dorothea Ngapoko Puretu George
Best Talent	Cook Islands − Dorothea Ngapoko Puretu George
Best Talent	Tonga − Nancy Maloni
Miss Internet	Tonga − Nancy Maloni
Miss Personality	New Caledonia − Edweena Talatini
Miss Photogenic	Unknown − Unknown
Miss National Tourism	Unknown − Unknown
Miss Popularity	Tonga − Nancy Maloni
People's Choice	Tonga − Nancy Maloni
Country/Territory	Contestant
American Samoa	Faith Toilolo
Cook Islands	Dorothea Ngapoko Puretu George
New Caledonia	Edweena Talatini
Niue	Lee-Sarah Heaki
Samoa	Falute Sauvao Vaauli
Tonga	Nancy Maloni
Wallis and Futuna	Monika Fiafialoto

Miss South Pacific 2006
Pageant Venue	Samoa Aquatic Centre, Tuanaimato, Samoa
Pageant Location	Samoa
Pageant Date	2006 November 11
Pageant Edition	20th Edition
Number of Candidates	7 Candidates
Placement	Contestant
Miss South Pacific 2006	Cook Islands − Krystina Te-Rangi Elizabeth Kauvai
1st Runner-Up	Samoa − Poinsettia Mary Seleisa Taefu
2nd Runner-Up	American Samoa − Charity Apinery Gregory
3rd Runner-Up	Tonga − Sina Uilani Nauahi
4th Runner-Up	New Caledonia − Aurélie Rollot
Award	Contestant
Best Traditional Wear	Tonga − Sina Uilani Nauahi
Best Sarong	Samoa − Poinsettia Mary Seleisa Taefu
Best Talent	Tonga − Sina Uilani Nauahi
Miss Internet	American Samoa − Charity Apinery Gregory
Miss Personality	Tahiti − Vairani Vahinerii Hoiore
Miss Photogenic	New Caledonia − Aurélie Rollot
Miss National Tourism	Samoa − Poinsettia Mary Seleisa Taefu
Best Interview	Samoa − Poinsettia Mary Seleisa Taefu
Country/Territory	Contestant
American Samoa	Charity Apinery Gregory
Cook Islands	Krystina Te-Rangi Elizabeth Kauvai
New Caledonia	Aurélie Rollot
Samoa	Poinsettia Mary Seleisa Taefu
Tahiti	Vairani Vahinerii Hoiore
Tonga	Sina Uilani Nauahi
Wallis and Futuna	Livina Fiafialoto

Miss South Pacific 2007
Pageant Venue	EFKS Youth Hall, Apia, Samoa
Pageant Location	Samoa
Pageant Date	2007 November 17
Pageant Edition	21st Edition
Number of Candidates	8 Candidates
Placement	Contestant
Miss South Pacific 2007	Tonga − Tesi Leila Toluta’u
1st Runner-Up	Cook Islands − Joyce Lucia Regina Fortes
2nd Runner-Up	Samoa − Sherry Natalie Elekana
3rd Runner-Up	Australiana/Torres Strait Island − Tania Michelle Wieclaw
4th Runner-Up	American Samoa − Wilhelmina Elisapeta Saelua
Award	Contestant
Best Traditional Wear	Tonga − Tesi Leila Toluta’u
Best Sarong	Tonga − Tesi Leila Toluta’u
Best Talent	Tonga − Tesi Leila Toluta’u
Miss Internet	Samoa − Sherry Natalie Elekana
Miss Personality	Australiana/Torres Strait Island − Tania Michelle Wieclaw
Miss Photogenic	New Zealand − Kyla Sheree Hei Hei
Best Interview	Tonga − Tesi Leila Toluta’u
Country/Territory	Contestant
Australiana/Torres Strait Island	Tania Michelle Wieclaw
American Samoa	Wilhelmina Elisapeta Saelua
Cook Islands	Joyce Lucia Regina Fortes
Hawaii	Lucie Michelle Poehere Wilson
New Zealand	Kyla Sheree Hei Hei
Niue	Christina Inalita Cawlins
Samoa	Sherry Natalie Elekana
Tonga	Tesi Leila Toluta’u

Miss South Pacific 2002
Pageant Venue	National Auditorium, Rarotonga, Cook Islands
Pageant Location	Cook Islands
Pageant Date	2002 November 29
Pageant Edition	16th Edition
Number of Candidates	7 Candidates
Placement	Contestant
Miss South Pacific 2002	American Samoa − Lupe Ane Kenafe Aumavae
1st Runner-Up	Cook Islands − Donna Tuara
2nd Runner-Up	Tonga − Phyllis Ruth Tohi
3rd Runner-Up	Samoa − Anita Jamieson
4th Runner-Up	Hawaii − Mahealani Reiko Kamau
Award	Contestant
Best Traditional Wear	Unknown − Unknown
Best Sarong	Unknown − Unknown
Best Talent	Samoa − Anita Jamieson
Miss Internet	Hawaii − Mahealani Reiko Kamau
Miss Personality	American Samoa − Lupe Ane Kenafe Aumavae
Miss Photogenic	Tonga − Phyllis Ruth Tohi
Miss National Tourism	Tuvalu − Lilly-Anne Faatalia Homasi
Country/Territory	Contestant
American Samoa	Lupe Ane Kenafe Aumavae
Cook Islands	Donna Tuara
Fiji	Sheetal Shivani Ram
Hawaii	Mahealani Reiko Kamau
Samoa	Anita Jamieson
Tuvalu	Lilly-Anne Faatalia Homasi
Tonga	Phyllis Ruth Tohi

Miss South Pacific 2003
Pageant Venue	EFKS Youth Hall, Apia, Samoa
Pageant Location	Samoa
Pageant Date	2003 November 8
Pageant Edition	17th Edition
Number of Candidates	6 Candidates
Placement	Contestant
Miss South Pacific 2003	Cook Islands − Janice Matatu Atua-A-Manavaroa Nicholas
1st Runner-Up	Tonga − Jessie Moala Philip
2nd Runner-Up	Samoa − Punipuao Cilla Brown
3rd Runner-Up	Northern Marianas − Olivia Srue Aloka Tebuteb
4th Runner-Up	American Samoa − Etelani Atia'e
5th Runner-Up	Tuvalu − Sita Simaileta Falefaea Tapumanaia
Award	Contestant
Best Traditional Wear	Cook Islands − Janice Matatu Atua-A-Manavaroa Nicholas
Best Sarong	Unknown − Unknown
Best Talent	Cook Islands − Janice Matatu Atua-A-Manavaroa Nicholas
Miss Internet	American Samoa − Etelani Atia'e
Miss Personality	Northern Marianas − Olivia Srue Aloka Tebuteb
Miss Personality	Tuvalu − Sita Simaileta Falefaea Tapumanaia
Miss Photogenic	Northern Marianas − Olivia Srue Aloka Tebuteb
Miss National Tourism	Tuvalu − Sita Simaileta Falefaea Tapumanaia
Country/Territory	Contestant
American Samoa	Etelani Atia'e
Cook Islands	Janice Matatu Atua-A-Manavaroa Nicholas
Northern Marianas	Olivia Srue Aloka Tebuteb
Samoa	Punipuao Cilla Brown
Tuvalu	Sita Simaileta Falefaea Tapumanaia
Tonga	Jessie Moala Philip

Miss South Pacific 2004
Pageant Venue	Pago Pago, American Samoa
Pageant Location	American Samoa
Pageant Date	2004 October 29
Pageant Edition	18th Edition
Number of Candidates	7 Candidates
Placement	Contestant
Miss South Pacific 2004	Niue − Kahealani Sariah Sinahemana Hekau
1st Runner-Up	Cook Islands − Noovai Karen Tylor
2nd Runner-Up	American Samoa − Trixy Theresa Taua
3rd Runner-Up	Northern Marianas − Louiena Ruth Leon Guerrero Pangelinan
4th Runner-Up	New Caledonia − Marianne Frédonie
Award	Contestant
Best Traditional Wear	Cook Islands − Noovai Karen Tylor
Best Sarong	Unknown − Unknown
Best Talent	Cook Islands − Noovai Karen Tylor
Miss Internet	Tonga − Telesia Malia Kalemeli Kaitapu
Miss Personality	Northern Marianas − Louiena Ruth Leon Guerrero Pangelinan
Miss Photogenic	New Caledonia − Marianne Frédonie
Miss National Tourism	Unknown − Unknown
Best National Costume	Northern Marianas − Louiena Ruth Leon Guerrero Pangelinan
Country/Territory	Contestant
American Samoa	Trixy Theresa Taua
Cook Islands	Noovai Karen Tylor
New Caledonia	Marianne Frédonie
Niue	Kahealani Sariah Sinahemana Hekau
Northern Marianas	Louiena Ruth Leon Guerrero Pangelinan
Samoa	Saifaleupolu Nofoasaefa Tamasese
Tonga	Telesia Malia Kalemeli Kaitapu

Miss South Pacific 1999
Pageant Venue	Queen Salote Memorial Hall, Nuku’alofa, Tonga
Pageant Location	Tonga
Pageant Date	1999 October 29
Pageant Edition	13th Edition
Number of Candidates	11 Candidates
Placement	Contestant
Miss South Pacific 1999	Cook Islands − Liana Tarita Vara Scott
1st Runner-Up	Tonga − Anaseini Papaha’amea Va-‘o Fonoti Taumeopeau Walker
2nd Runner-Up	Papua New Guinea − Helai Moana Oala
3rd Runner-Up	Samoa − Taralina Ancalin Gae’e
4th Runner-Up	Fiji − Joanne Kakoa Terubea
Award	Contestant
Best Traditional Wear	Cook Islands − Liana Tarita Vara Scott
Best Sarong	Hawaii − Radasha Leialoha Ho’ohuli
Best Talent	Tonga − Anaseini Papaha’amea Va-‘o Fonoti Taumeopeau Walker
Best Sash Award	Tonga − Anaseini Papaha’amea Va-‘o Fonoti Taumeopeau Walker
Best Coconut Award	Samoa − Taralina Ancalin Gae’e
Miss Personality	Papua New Guinea − Helai Moana Oala
Miss Photogenic	Solomon Islands −
Miss National Tourism	Samoa − Taralina Ancalin Gae’e
Best Float	Unknown − Unknown
Country/Territory	Contestant
American Samoa	Vaisa’as’a Ofisa Galea’i
Cook Islands	Liana Tarita Vara Scott
Fiji	Joanne Kakoa Terubea
Hawaii	Radasha Leialoha Ho’ohuli
Niue	Nikola Funaki
Papua New Guinea	Helai Moana Oala
Samoa	Taralina Ancalin Gae’e
Samoa Hawaii	Meilyn Leilani Keleti Otemai
Samoa New Zealand	Susanaivanu Leinati Talagi
Solomon Islands	Susanaivanu Leinati Talagi
Tonga	Anaseini Papaha’amea Va-‘o Fonoti Taumeopeau Walker

Miss South Pacific 2000
Pageant Venue	Lee Auditoium, Pago Pago, American Samoa
Pageant Location	American Samoa
Pageant Date	2000 October 26
Pageant Edition	14th Edition
Number of Candidates	13 Candidates
Placement	Contestant
Miss South Pacific 2000	American Samoa − Helen Afatasi Burke
1st Runner-Up	Samoa − Petra May Suhren
2nd Runner-Up	Samoa Hawaii − Vaneta April Moegi
3rd Runner-Up	Samoa Aotearoa New Zealand − Elaine Robin Ward
4th Runner-Up	Hawaii − Jocelyn Keolalaulani Dalire
Award	Contestant
Best Traditional Wear	Samoa − Petra May Suhren
Best Sarong	Papua New Guinea − Roberta Zoe Ali
Best Talent	American Samoa − Helen Afatasi Burke
Miss Internet	Unknown − Unknown
Best Sash Award	Unknown − Unknown
Best Coconut Award	Unknown − Unknown
Miss Personality	Hawaii − Jocelyn Keolalaulani Dalire
Miss Photogenic	Samoa Aotearoa New Zealand − Elaine Robin Ward
Miss National Tourism	American Samoa − Helen Afatasi Burke
Best Float	Unknown − Unknown
Country/Territory	Contestant
American Samoa	Helen Afatasi Burke
Cook Islands	Janine Marito Kauvai
Hawaii	Jocelyn Keolalaulani Dalire
Nauru	Henrietta Deireragea
Niue	Anna Rose Pavihi
Papua New Guinea	Roberta Zoe Ali
Papua New Guinea Australia	Irene Meredith Barlow
Samoa	Petra May Suhren
Samoa Australia	Gina Taupau
Samoa Aotearoa New Zealand	Elaine Robin Ward
Samoa Hawaii	Vaneta April Moegi
Samoa San Francisco	Luisa Pouea
Tonga	Christina Ann Kaitapu

Miss South Pacific 2001
Pageant Venue	EFKS Youth Hall, Apia, Samoa
Pageant Location	Samoa
Pageant Date	2001 October 26
Pageant Edition	15th Edition
Number of Candidates	6 Candidates
Placement	Contestant
Miss South Pacific 2001	Samoa − Manamea Marlene Apelu
1st Runner-Up	Hawaii − Jamie Unciano
2nd Runner-Up	American Samoa − Vitalia Samoata Ann Kline
3rd Runner-Up	Tonga − Christie Marie Rosh'n Nau Fepulea'i
4th Runner-Up	Pohnpei, Micronesia − Serlinda Soukon
5th Runner-Up	Niue Island − Rossylyn Arney Pulehetoa
Award	Contestant
Best Traditional Wear	Tonga − Christie Marie Rosh'n Nau Fepulea'i
Best Sarong	Niue Island − Rossylyn Arney Pulehetoa
Best Talent	Samoa − Manamea Marlene Apelu
Miss Internet	Samoa − Manamea Marlene Apelu
Best Sash Award	Samoa − Manamea Marlene Apelu
Best Coconut Award	Samoa − Manamea Marlene Apelu
Miss Personality	Pohnpei, Micronesia − Serlinda Soukon
Miss Photogenic	Samoa − Manamea Marlene Apelu
Miss National Tourism	Niue Island − Rossylyn Arney Pulehetoa
Best Float	Samoa − Manamea Marlene Apelu
Country/Territory	Contestant
American Samoa	Vitalia Samoata Ann Kline
Hawaii	Jamie Unciano
Niue Island	Serlinda Soukon
Pohnpei, Micronesia	Rossylyn Arney Pulehetoa
Samoa	Manamea Marlene Apelu
Tonga	Christie Marie Rosh'n Nau Fepulea'i

Miss South Pacific 1996
Pageant Venue	Mothers & Youth Centre Auditorium, Apia, Western Samoa
Pageant Location	Western Samoa
Pageant Edition	10th Edition
Placement	Contestant
Miss South Pacific 1996	Western Samoa − Verona Lovell Tapu Ah Ching
1st Runner-Up	Unknown − Unknown
2nd Runner-Up	Samoa New Zealand − Sovita Mauga
Award	Contestant
Best Talent	Samoa - Verona Lovel Tapu Ah Ching
Country/Territory	Contestant
American Samoa	Tapuitea Fanene
Hawaii	Dana Lee Kaleleoalani Paio
Samoa New Zealand	Sovita Mauga
Tonga	Elisapeti Mary Bourke Morris
Papua New Guinea	Jacqueline Bundu
Western Samoa	Verona Lovel Tapu Ah Ching
Cook Islands New Zealand	Ruth Forsythe
Aotearoa New Zealand	Natalie Peehi
Tahiti	Heia Naehu
Samoa Hawaii	Mariana Petronila Timu
Samoa Australia	Barbara Thompson
Niue	Zelda Folau Brown
Cook Islands	Tina Vogel

Miss South Pacific 1997
Pageant Venue	Auckland Town Hall, Auckland, New Zealand
Pageant Location	New Zealand
Pageant Date	1997 December 6
Pageant Edition	11th Edition
Number of Candidates	13 Candidates
Placement	Contestant
Miss South Pacific 1997	Samoa − Mary-Jane Moe McKibben
1st Runner-Up	Fiji − Letila Mitchell
2nd Runner-Up	Tahiti − Tepoe Dauphin
3rd Runner-Up	Hawaii − Michelle Malulani
4th Runner-Up	Tonga − Anita Siosi'ana Lavulo Roberts Taumoepeau
Country/Territory	Contestant
American Samoa	Unknown
Fiji	Letila Mitchell
Hawaii	Michelle Malulani
New Zealand	Unknown
Niue	Unknown
Papua New Guinea	Janet Kabo
Samoa	Mary-Jane Moe McKibbin
Samoa New Zealand	Susan Pa'u
Tahiti	Tepoe Dauphin
Tonga	Anita Siosi'ana Lavulo Roberts Taumoepeau

Miss South Pacific 1998
Pageant Venue	Infront of the Samoa Government Building, Apia, Samoa
Pageant Location	Samoa
Pageant Date	1998 December 5
Pageant Edition	12th Edition
Number of Candidates	12 Candidates
Placement	Contestant
Miss South Pacific 1998	Samoa − Cheri Robinson
1st Runner-Up	Fiji − Ranadi Johnston
2nd Runner-Up	American Samoa − Simeamativa Peleipu Kruse
3rd Runner-Up	Cook Islands − Tina Marie Vogel
4th Runner-Up	Aotearoa New Zealand − Julia Regan
Award	Contestant
Best Traditional Wear	Cook Islands − Tina Marie Vogel
Best Sarong	Hawaii − Katheryn Kilihune Lopes
Best Talent	Samoa − Cheri Robinson
Best Sash Award	Cook Islands − Tina Marie Vogel
Best Coconut Award*	Hawaii − Katheryn Kilihune Lopes
Miss Personality	Samoa Hawaii − Jeannie May Timoteo
Miss Photogenic	Cook Islands − Tina Marie Vogel
Miss National Tourism	Papua New Guinea −
Best Float	Fiji − Tanadi Johnston
Country/Territory	Contestant
Papua New Guinea	Lisa Linibi
Cook Islands	Tina Vogel
Samoa Hawaii	Jeannie Timoteo
Fiji	Ranadi Johnston
Samoa	Cheri Robinson
Tonga	Ana Koester
Solomon Islands	Atenasi Ata
American Samoa	Simeamativa Peleiupu Kruse
Aotearoa New Zealand	Julia Ryan
Papua New Guinea Australia	Eileen Nilan
Niue	Jane Jackson
Hawaii	Kilihune Lopes

Miss South Pacific 1993
Pageant Venue	Lee Auditorium, Pago Pago, American Samoa
Pageant Location	American Samoa
Pageant Edition	7th Edition
Placement	Contestant
Miss South Pacific 1993	American Samoa – Leilua Stevenson Fuimaono
1st Runner-Up	Samoa New Zealand − Norma Meleisea
Country/Territory	Contestant
American Samoa	Leilua Stevenson Fuimaono
Samoa New Zealand	Norma Meleisea

Miss South Pacific 1994
Pageant Venue	Lee Auditorium, Pago Pago, American Samoa
Pageant Location	American Samoa
Pageant Edition	8th Edition
Number of Candidates	11 Candidates
Placement	Contestant
Miss South Pacific 1994	Cook Islands − Tarita Brown
Country/Territory	Contestant
American Samoa	Lorena Elizabeth Tiapula Cruz
Aotearoa New Zealand	Chwanita Graham
Cook Islands	Tarita Brown
Cook Islands New Zealand	Alice Teinakore
Hawaiian Islands	Tina Rene'e Martin
Niue	Michelle Doris Moira Kalaisi Folau
Niue New Zealand	Sieva Jackson
Papua New Guinea	Maila Gabi
Samoa Hawaii	Setema Soaimaile Siofele
Samoa New Zealand	Sharon Rosa Iputau
Western Samoa	Lili-o-le-vao Faamausili

Miss South Pacific 1995
Pageant Venue	Hôtel Dateline, Nukualofa, Tonga
Pageant Location	Tonga
Pageant Edition	9th Edition
Number of Candidates	17 Candidates
Placement	Contestant
Miss South Pacific 1995	American Samoa – Rochelle Rowena Tuitele
1st Runner-Up	Samoa Australia − Mary-Jane Moe McKibben
2nd Runner-Up	Samoa New Zealand − Roxanna Moana Clark
3rd Runner-Up	Cook Islands − Victoria Keil
Award	Contestant
Best Traditional Wear	Western Samoa − Marie Enosa
Miss Personality	Tonga Australia − Telesia Afeaki
Miss Photogenic	Western Samoa − Marie Enosa
Country/Territory	Contestant
American Samoa	Rochelle Rowena Tuitele
Cook Islands	Victoria Keil
Fiji	Jacqueline Movoa
Hawaii	Alice Vasiti Wighti
Samoa Australia	Mary-Jane Moe McKibbin
Samoa New Zealand	Roxanna Moana Clark
Tonga	Ma’ata Mo’ungaloa
Tonga Australia	Telesia Afeaki
Western Samoa	Marie Enosa
Aotearoa	Maria Barnes
Papua New Guinea	Imanakone Sioa
Niue	Pauline Hipa-Rex
Cook Islands NZ	Cleo Teata Speers
Tonga NZ	unknown
Niue NZ	unknown
Fiji International	Reijeli Ratu

Miss South Pacific 1990
Pageant Venue	Cook Islands
Pageant Edition	4th Edition
Placement	Contestant
Miss South Pacific 1990	Tahiti − Henarii Arauva'a
Country/Territory	Contestant
Tahiti	Henarii Arauva'a
Western Samoa	Tapa’au Folasa Samoa

Miss South Pacific 1991
Pageant Venue	Apia, Western Samoa
Pageant Edition	5th Edition
Placement	Contestant
Miss South Pacific 1991	Cook Islands − Kimiora Vogel
Country/Territory	Contestant
Cook Islands	Kimiora Vogel
Samoa New Zealand	Marceena Friis
Western Samoa	Soloia Lumepa Meleisea

Miss South Pacific 1992
Pageant Venue	Samoa
Pageant Edition	6th Edition
Placement	Contestant
Miss South Pacific 1992	Samoa New Zealand − Julia Teovai
Country/Territory	Contestant
Samoa New Zealand	Julia Teovai

Miss South Pacific 1987
Pageant Venue	Tanoa Hotel, Apia, Western Samoa
Pageant Edition	1st Edition
Placement	Contestant
Miss South Pacific 1987	American Samoa – Juliet Spencer Sword
Country/Territory	Contestant
American Samoa	Juliet Spencer Sword
Western Samoa	Ursula Elizabeth Curry

Miss South Pacific 1988
Pageant Venue	Apia, Western Samoa
Pageant Edition	2nd Edition
Placement	Contestant
Miss South Pacific 1988	Samoa Hawaii – Theresa Purcell
1st Runner-Up	Hawaii – Leimomi Bacalso
Country/Territory	Contestant
Hawaii	Leimomi Bacalso
Samoa Hawaii	Theresa Purcell

Miss South Pacific 1989
Pageant Venue	Samoa
Pageant Edition	3rd Edition
Placement	Contestant
Miss South Pacific 1989	Tahiti − Reire Cheveaux
Country/Territory	Contestant
Tahiti	Reire Cheveaux

== See also ==
- List of beauty contests
