= List of films: B =

indexed lists of films
0–9	A	B	C	D	E	F
G	H	I	J–K	L	M	N–O
P	Q–R	S	T	U–V–W	X–Y–Z	

This is an alphabetical list of film articles (or sections within articles about films). It includes made for television films. See the talk page for the method of indexing used.

== B ==
- B. Monkey (1998)
- B.A.P.S. (1997)
- B.E.D. (2012)
- B.Tech (2018)

=== Ba ===
==== Baa ====
- Baa Baa Land (2017)
- Baa Baaa Black Sheep (2018)
- Baa Baaro Rasika (2004)
- Baa Bega Chandamama (2008)
- Baa Nalle Madhuchandrake (1993)
- Baa Nanna Preethisu (1992)
- Baabarr (2009)
- Baabul (2006)
- Baadada Hoo (1982)
- Baadasssss! (2004)
- BaadAsssss Cinema (2002)
- Baadal (1951)
- Baadal (1985)
- Baadbaan (1954)
- Baader (2002)
- The Baader Meinhof Complex (2008)
- Baadshah (1999)
- Baadshah (2013)
- Baadshaho (2017)
- Baaghi (1990)
- Baaghi (2000)
- Baaghi series:
  - Baaghi (2016)
  - Baaghi 2 (2018)
  - Baaghi 3 (2020)
  - Baaghi 4 (2025)
- Baagyavathi (1957)
- Baahubali series:
  - Baahubali: The Beginning (2015)
  - Baahubali 2: The Conclusion (2017)
  - Baahubali: The Epic (2025)
- Baaja (2002)
- Baaje Ghungroo (1962)
- Baaji (1963)
- Baaji (2019)
- Baakki Vannavar (2022)
- Baal (1970)
- Baala Bandana (1971)
- Baalaraajana Kathe (1965)
- Baalbhaarti (2022)
- Baali Umar Ko Salaam (1994)
- Baalu Belagithu (1970)
- Baalu Jenu (1976)
- Baalyaprathijna (1972)
- Baamma Maata Bangaru Baata (1989)
- Baana Kaathadi (2010)
- Baanaadi (2014)
- Baanam (2009)
- Baandhon (2012)
- Baang (2023)
- Baankey Ki Crazy Baraat (2015)
- Baantjer, de film: De Cock en de wraak zonder einde (1999 TV)
- Baap Beti (1954)
- Baap Ji (2021)
- Baap Manus (2023)
- Baap Numbri Beta Dus Numbri (1990)
- Baap Re Baap (1955)
- Baap Re Baap (2019)
- Baapjanma (2017)
- Baaplyok (2023)
- Baapu (2025)
- Baara (1978)
- Baaraige Fas (2009)
- Baaram (2018)
- Baari (2015)
- Baari Tar Bangla (2014)
- Baarish (1957)
- Baarìa (2009)
- Baashha (1995)
- Baat Ban Jaye (1986)
- Baat Bann Gayi (2013)
- Baat Cheet (2015)
- Baat Ek Raat Ki (1962)
- Baat Hai Pyaar Ki (1991)
- Baava (2010)
- Baava Baamaida (2001)
- Baavare Prem He (2014)
- Baavra Mann (2013)
- Baawri (1982)
- Baaz (1953)
- Baaz (1992)
- Baaz: A Bird in Danger (2003)
- Baazaar (2018)
- Baazi (1951)
- Baazi (1968)
- Baazi (1984)
- Baazi (1995)
- Baazi (2021)
- Baazigar (1993)

==== Bab ====
- Bab the Fixer (1917)
- Bab's Burglar (1917)
- Bab's Diary (1917)
- Bab's Matinee Idol (1917)
- Baba (2002)
- Baba Joon (2015)
- Baba Kalyani (2006)
- Baba Luba (1995)
- Baba Ramdev (1963)
- Baba Yaga (1973)
- Baba Yaga is against! (1979)
- Baba Yaga: Terror of the Dark Forest (2020)
- The Babadook (2014)
- Babai (2015)
- Babai Abbai (1985)
- Babai Hotel (1992)
- Babaing Hampaslupa (1988)
- Babak and Friends (2005)
- Baban (2018)
- Babang Luksa (2011)
- Babar: King of the Elephants (1999)
- Babar: The Movie (1989)
- Babar Naam Gandhiji (2015)
- Babatu (1976)
- Babayaran Mo ng Dugo (1989)
- Babbitt: (1924 & 1934)
- Babe (series):
  - Babe (1995)
  - Babe: Pig in the City (1998)
- The Babe (1992)
- Babe Comes Home (1927)
- Babe, I Hate to Go (2017)
- Babe, I Love You (2010)
- Babe Ruth (1991 TV)
- Babe's & Rickey's Inn (2013)
- Babe's School Days (1915)
- Babek (1979)
- Babel (2006)
- Babenco: Tell Me When I Die (2019)
- Babes (2024)
- Babes in Arms (1939)
- Babes in Bagdad (1952)
- Babes on Broadway (1941)
- Babes a GoGo (1956)
- Babes at Sea (1934)
- Babes on Swing Street (1944)
- Babes in Toyland: (1934, 1961, 1986 & 1997)
- Babes in the Woods (1932)
- Babette (1917)
- Babette Goes to War (1959)
- Babette's Feast (1988)
- Babicka (2003)
- Babičky dobíjejte přesně! (1984)
- Babies (2010)
- Babies for Sale (1940)
- Babilonia (1987)
- Babina (2000)
- Babine (2008)
- Babiy Yar (2003)
- Babloo (2011)
- Babloo Bachelor (2020)
- Babloo Happy Hai (2014)
- Bablusha (2016)
- BABO (2008)
- Baboo Band Baaja (2012)
- Babruvahana: (1964 & 1977)
- Babs: (1920, 2000 & 2017)
- Babu: (1971, 1975 & 1985)
- Babu Baga Busy (2017)
- Babu Bangaram (2016)
- Babu I Love You (2005)
- Babuji Ek Ticket Bambai (2017)
- Babul (1950)
- Babul Ki Galiyaan (1972)
- Babulugaadi Debba (1981)
- Babumon (1975)
- Babumoshai Bandookbaaz (2017)
- Baby: (1915, 2000 TV, 2002, 2007, 2010, 2015 Hindi, 2015 Tamil & 2016)
- The Baby (1973)
- Baby Blood (1990)
- Baby Blue Marine (1976)
- Baby Blues: (1941, 2008 & 2012)
- Baby on Board (2009)
- Baby Boom (1987)
- Baby Bottleneck (1946)
- Baby Boy (2001)
- Baby of the Bride (1991 TV)
- Baby Brokers (1994 TV)
- Baby Brother (1927)
- Baby Buggy Bunny (1954)
- Baby Bumps (2017)
- Baby Cakes (1989 TV)
- Baby Clothes (1926)
- Baby Doll: (1916 & 1956)
- Baby Done (2020)
- Baby Driver (2017)
- Baby Face (1933)
- Baby Face Harrington (1935)
- Baby Face Morgan (1942)
- Baby Face Nelson (1957)
- Baby Geniuses (1999)
- Baby God (2020)
- Baby Hands (1912)
- Baby Huey's Great Easter Adventure (1998)
- Baby and I (2008)
- Baby It's You (1983)
- Baby Love: (1968 & 2008)
- The Baby of Mâcon (1993)
- Baby Mama (2008)
- Baby Mine: (1917 & 1928)
- Baby the Rain Must Fall (1965)
- Baby for Sale (2004 TV)
- Baby: Secret of the Lost Legend (1985)
- Baby Sellers (2013 TV)
- Baby Sister (1983 TV)
- Baby Sitters Jitters (1951)
- Baby Snakes (1979)
- Baby Snatcher (1992 TV)
- Baby, Sorry (2015)
- Baby, Take a Bow (1934)
- Baby Thief (1991)
- Baby's Day Out (1994)
- Baby's Toilet (1905)
- The Baby-Sitters Club (1995)
- Babyfever (1994)
- Babygirl (2024)
- Babylon: (1980 & 2022)
- Babylon 5 series:
  - Babylon 5: In the Beginning (1998) (TV)
  - Babylon 5: The Legend of the Rangers (2002) (TV)
  - Babylon 5: Thirdspace (1998) (TV)
- Babylon A.D. (2008)
- The Babysitter: (1980, 1995 & 2017)
- The Babysitter: Killer Queen (2020)
- Babysitter Massacre (2013)
- Babysitter Wanted (2008)
- The Babysitters (2007)
- Babysitting (2014)
- Babysitting 2 (2015)
- Babyteeth (2019)

==== Bac ====
- Baccara (1935)
- Baccarat (1919)
- Baccha Shoshur (2019)
- Bach and Broccoli (1986)
- Bach the Detective (1936)
- Bach the Millionaire (1933)
- Bach's Fight for Freedom (1995 TV)
- Bachaana (2016)
- Bachana Chahane Haru (1982)
- Bachchan: (2013 & 2014)
- Bachchan Pandey (2022)
- Bachche Kachche Sachche (2017)
- Bachchon Ka Khel (1946)
- Bachelor (2004)
- The Bachelor: (1955, 1990 & 1999)
- Bachelor Apartment (1931)
- Bachelor of Arts (1934)
- Bachelor Bait (1934)
- The Bachelor and the Bobby-Soxer (1947)
- Bachelor Brides (1926)
- Bachelor Daddy (1941)
- Bachelor Father (1939)
- Bachelor Flat (1962)
- Bachelor Games (2016)
- Bachelor Girl (1988 TV)
- Bachelor Girls (2016)
- Bachelor Mother: (1932 & 1939)
- Bachelor in Paradise (1961)
- Bachelor Party: (1984 & 2012)
- Bachelor Party 2: The Last Temptation (2008)
- Bachelor Party Vegas (2006)
- Bachelor's Affairs (1932)
- Bachelor's Baby (1932)
- Bachelor's Paradise: (1928 & 1939)
- Bachelorette (2012)
- Bachelors' Love (2013)
- Bachi (2000)
- Bachiatari Bōryoku Ningen (2010)
- Bachke Rehna Re Baba (2005)
- Bachna Ae Haseeno (2008)
- Bachpan: (1945 & 1970)
- Baciato dalla fortuna (2011)
- Back to 1942 (2012)
- Back to 1989 (2016)
- Back Alley Oproar (1948)
- Back to Bataan (1945)
- Back to the Beach (1987)
- Back of Beyond (1995)
- Back in Action (1994 & 2025)
- Back in Business: (1997 & 2007)
- Back in Circulation (1937)
- Back in Crime (2013)
- Back in the Day: (2005, 2014 & 2016)
- Back from the Dead (1957)
- Back Door Channels: The Price of Peace (2009)
- Back Door to Heaven (1939)
- Back Door to Hell (1964)
- Back from Eternity (1956)
- Back Fire (1922)
- Back and Forth (1969)
- Back at the Front (1952)
- Back from the Front (1943)
- Back from Hell (1992)
- Back Home and Broke (1922)
- Back Long Ago (1969)
- Back of the Medal (1965)
- Back by Midnight (2002)
- Back of the Net (2019)
- Back Pay: (1922 & 1930)
- Back Roads: (1981 & 2018)
- Back-Room Boy (1942)
- Back in the Saddle (1941)
- Back in the Seventies (1945)
- Back Stage: (1917, 1919 & 1923)
- Back Street: (1932, 1941 & 1961)
- Back Street Girls: Gokudols (2019)
- Back Streets of Paris (1946)
- Back Then (1943)
- Back in Time (2015)
- Back Trail (1948)
- Back on Track (2013)
- Back in Trouble (1997)
- Back in the USSR (1992)
- Back to the Future series:
  - Back to the Future (1985)
  - Back to the Future Part II (1989)
  - Back to the Future Part III (1990)
- Back to School (1986)
- Back to School with Franklin (2003)
- The Back-up Plan (2010)
- Backbeat (1994)
- Backcountry (2014)
- Backdraft (1991)
- Backkom Bear: Agent 008 (2017)
- Backlash: (1956 & 1986)
- Backroads: (1977 & 1997)
- Backrooms (2026)
- Backtrack (2015)
- The Backwoods (2006)
- Bacon Grabbers (1929)
- Bacurau (2019)

==== Bad ====
- Bad 25 (2007)
- The Bad and the Beautiful (1952)
- Bad Boy: (1935, 1939 & 1949)
- Bad Boy Bubby (1993)
- Bad Boys: (1961, 1983 & 2014)
- Bad Boys series:
  - Bad Boys (1995)
  - Bad Boys II (2003)
  - Bad Boys for Life (2020)
  - Bad Boys: Ride or Die (2024)
- Bad Candy (2020)
- Bad Company: (1925, 1931, 1946, 1972, 1980, 1986, 1995, 1999 & 2002)
- Bad Day at Black Rock (1955)
- Bad Dreams (1988)
- Bad Education: (2004 & 2019)
- The Bad Education Movie (2015)
- Bad Eggs (2003)
- Bad Genius (2017)
- Bad Girl: (1931, 1963 & 2012)
- Bad Girls: (1994, 2007 & 2012)
- Bad Guy: (1937 & 2001)
- The Bad Guys (2022)
- Bad Guys Always Die (2015)
- The Bad Guys: Reign of Chaos (2019)
- Bad Hair Day (2015)
- Bad Hurt (2015)
- Bad Influence (1990)
- Bad Kids series:
  - Bad Kids Go to Hell (2012)
  - Bad Kids of Crestview Academy (2017)
- Badland Hunters (2023)
- The Bad Lands (1925)
- Bad Lieutenant (1992)
- Bad Lieutenant: Port of Call New Orleans (2009)
- The Bad Man: (1923, 1930 & 1941)
- Bad Man's Bluff (1926)
- Bad Man's River (1971)
- Bad Moms (2016)
- A Bad Moms Christmas (2017)
- Bad Moon: (1996 & 2005)
- The Bad News Bears series:
  - The Bad News Bears (1976)
  - The Bad News Bears in Breaking Training (1977)
  - The Bad News Bears Go to Japan (1978)
  - Bad News Bears (2005)
- Bad Samaritan (2018)
- Bad Santa (2003)
- Bad Santa 2 (2016)
- The Bad Seed: (1956 & 1985)
- Bad Sister (2014)
- The Bad Sleep Well (1960)
- Bad Tales (2020)
- Bad Taste (1987)
- Bad Teacher (2011)
- Bad Times at the El Royale (2018)
- Bad Timing (1980)
- Bad Trip (2021)
- Bad Words (2013)
- Badal (2000)
- Bade Miyan Chote Miyan (1998)
- The Badge (2002)
- Badge 373 (1973)
- The Badge of Marshal Brennan (1957)
- Badger's Green: (1934 & 1949)
- The Badlanders (1958)
- Badlands (1973)

==== Baf–Bag ====
- Bafana (2006)
- Baffled! (1973 TV)
- Bag and Baggage (1923)
- Bag Boy Lover Boy (2014)
- Bag of the Collector (1979)
- Bag It (2010)
- Bag Københavns kulisser (1935)
- Baga Beach (2013)
- Bagavathi (2002)
- Bagdad (1949)
- Bagdad Cafe (1987)
- Bageecha (2018)
- Baggage (2017)
- Baggage Claim (2013)
- Bagh Bahadur (1989)
- Bagh Bondi Khela (1975)
- Bagha Jatin: (1958 & 2023)
- Baghaawat – Ek Jung (2001)
- Baghavat (1982)
- Baghban: (1938 & 2003)
- Baghdad or Bust (2004)
- Baghdad ER (2006)
- Baghdad Gaja Donga (1968)
- Baghdad Ka Chor (1946)
- Baghdad Messi (2023)
- Baghdad Perazhagi (1973)
- Baghdad Texas (2009)
- Baghdad Thirudan (1960)
- Baghead: (2008 & 2023)
- Bagheera: (2023 & 2024)
- Baghi (1956)
- Baghi Di Dhee (2022)
- Baghi Sipahi: (1936, 1958 & 1986)
- Baghini: (1968 & 2019)
- Baghjan (2024)
- Bagi, the Monster of Mighty Nature (1985)
- Bagman (2024)
- Bago Sarr Hnint Thu Ei Virus Myarr (2016)
- Bagong Buwan (2001)
- Bagpat Ka Dulha (2019)
- Bagyavathi (1957)

==== Bah–Bak ====
- Bah, Humduck! A Looney Tunes Christmas (2006)
- Bahaar Aane Tak (1990)
- Bahad (2019)
- Bahaddur (2014)
- Bahaddur Gandu (1976)
- Bahama Passage (1941)
- Bahana (1942)
- Bahana (1960)
- Bahar (1951)
- Baharen Phir Bhi Aayengi (1966)
- Baharo Phool Barsao (1972)
- Baharon Ke Manzil (1991)
- Baharon Ke Sapne (1967)
- Baharon Ki Manzil: (1968 & 1973)
- Bahay Kubo: A Pinoy Mano Po! (2007)
- Bahay na Pula (2022)
- Bahen (1941)
- A Bahraini Tale (2006)
- Bahu Begum (1967)
- Bahu Bharya (1999)
- Bahut Din Huwe (1954)
- Bahut Hua Samman (2020)
- Baignade en mer (1896)
- Baiju Bawra (1952)
- Bailout at 43,000 (1957)
- Baise-moi (2000)
- Bait: (1950, 2000 & 2019)
- The Bait: (1921, 1973 TV & 1995)
- Baja (2018)
- Baji (2015)
- Bajing Ireng dan Jaka Sembung (1985)
- Bajirao Mastani (2015)
- Bajo la metralla (1983)
- Bajrangachi Kamal (1994)
- Bajrangbali (1976)
- Bajrangi Bhaijaan (2015)
- Bajre Da Sitta (2022)
- The Baker's Wife (1938)
- The Bakery Girl of Monceau (1962)
- Bakit Hindi Ka Crush ng Crush Mo? (2013)
- Bakit Kinagat ni Adan ang Mansanas ni Eba? (1988)
- Bakit Labis Kitang Mahal (1992)
- Bakit Lahat ng Gwapo may Boyfriend? (2016)
- Bakit May Kahapon Pa? (1996)
- Bakita Byaktigato (2013)
- Baksho Rahashya (1996) (TV)
- Bakul Priya (1997)
- Bakuman (2015)
- Bakumatsu (1970)

==== Bal–Bam ====
- Bal Tabarin (1952)
- Bal Thu Pyaing Lo Hla Par Taw Naing (1973)
- Bala Bala Sese (2015)
- Bala Gau Kashi Angai (1977)
- Bala Nagamma: (1942, 1959, 1966 & 1981)
- Balaclava (1928)
- Balagam (2023)
- Balahibong Pusa (2001)
- Balala the Fairies: Princess Camellia (2016)
- Balalaika (1938)
- Balam: (1949 & 2009)
- Balan (1938)
- Balangiga: Howling Wilderness (2017)
- Balapareekshanam (1978)
- Balayogini (1937)
- The Balcony (1963)
- Ball of Fire (1941)
- The Ball Game (1898)
- The Ballad of Buster Scruggs (2018)
- The Ballad of Cable Hogue (1970)
- Ballad of the Cart (1959)
- The Ballad of Gregorio Cortez (1982)
- The Ballad of Jack and Rose (2005)
- The Ballad of Narayama: (1958 & 1983)
- The Ballad of the Sad Café (1991)
- Ballad of a Soldier (1959)
- Ballet Mécanique (1924)
- Ballistic (2026)
- Ballistic: Ecks vs. Sever (2002)
- The Balloonatic (1923)
- Ballot Box Bunny (1951)
- The Ballroom (2007)
- The Ballroom of Romance (1986)
- Balls of Fury (2007)
- Balthazar (1966)
- Baltic Storm (2003)
- The Baltimorons (2025)
- Balto series:
  - Balto (1995)
  - Balto II: Wolf Quest (2002)
  - Balto III: Wings of Change (2004)
- Balu (2005)
- Balyasakhi (1954)
- Balzac and the Little Chinese Seamstress (2002)
- Bam Bam and Celeste (2005)
- Bama Vijayam: (1934 & 1967)
- Bamako (2006)
- Bambai Ka Babu (1996)
- Bambai Ki Sair (1941)
- Bambai Raat Ki Bahon Mein (1967)
- Bambaiwali (1941)
- Bambi (1942)
- Bambi II (2006)
- Bambi Meets Godzilla (1969)
- Bambi's Childhood (1985)
- Bamboo (2023)
- The Bamboo Blonde (1946)
- Bamboo Boys (2002)
- Bamboo Gods and Iron Men (1974)
- The Bamboo Prison (1954)
- The Bamboo Saucer (1968)
- Bamboozled (2000)
- Bambuti (1956)
- Bamfaad (2020)
- Bamse and the Witch's Daughter (2016)

==== Ban ====
- Banal: (2008 & 2019)
- Banana (2015)
- Banana Club (1996)
- Banana Joe (1982)
- Banana Peel (1963)
- Banana Ridge (1942)
- Banana Split (2018)
- The Banana Splits Movie (2019)
- Banana da Terra (1939)
- Bananas (1971)
- Bananas!* (2009)
- Bananas Unpeeled (2000)
- Bananaz (2008)
- Bananes mécaniques (1973)
- Banaras: (2006, 2009 & 2022)
- Banarasi Babu: (1973 & 1997)
- Banarsi Thug (1962)
- Banashankari (1977)
- Banat (2015)
- Banaz: A Love Story (2012)
- Band Aid (2017)
- Band Baaja Baaraat (2010)
- Band and Battalion of the U.S. Indian School (1901)
- Band of the Hand (1986)
- Band Master (1993)
- Band of Outsiders (1964)
- The Band Plays On (1934)
- Band of Robbers (2015)
- Band of Thieves (1962)
- Band Toh Baje Ga (2018 TV)
- Band Waggon (1940)
- The Band Wagon (1953)
- The Band's Visit (2007)
- Bande à part (1964)
- Bande Utkala Janani (2008)
- Banderas, the Tyrant (1993)
- Bandham (1985)
- Bandhan: (1940, 1956, 1969, 1991, 1998 & 2004)
- Bandhana (1984)
- Bandhanam (1978)
- Bandhanaya (2017)
- Bandhavyalu (1968)
- Bandhobi (2009)
- Bandhu Balaga (2008)
- Bandhu Mohanty (1977)
- Bandhukkal Sathrukkal (1993)
- Bandi Theke Begum (1975)
- Bandidas (2006)
- Bandido (1956)
- Bandidos (1967)
- Bandini (1963)
- Bandipotu: (1963 & 2015)
- Bandish: (1955, 1980 Indian, 1980 Pakistan & 1996)
- Bandishala (2019)
- Bandit (2022)
- The Bandit (1996)
- The Bandit Buster (1926)
- Bandit King of Texas (1949)
- Bandit Queen (1994)
- The Bandit Queen (1950)
- The Bandit of Sherwood Forest (1946)
- The Bandit Trail (1941)
- Bandits: (1997 & 2001)
- Bandits in Milan (1968)
- Bandits vs. Samurai Squadron (1978)
- Bandolero! (1968)
- Bandra (2023)
- Bandslam (2009)
- Bang! (1977)
- Bang Bang (2011)
- Bang Bang! (2014)
- Bang Bang Baby (2014)
- Bang Bang You're Dead (2002)
- Bang the Drum Slowly (1973)
- Bang Gang (A Modern Love Story) (2015)
- Bangaarada Manushya (1970)
- Bangaarada Panjara (1974)
- Bangaaru Kalalu (1974)
- Bangali Babu English Mem (2014)
- Bangalore 560023 (2015)
- Bangalore Days (2014)
- Bangalore Naatkal (2016)
- Bangar Patler (1993)
- Bangara s/o Bangarada Manushya (2017)
- Bangarada Gudi (1976)
- Bangarada Hoovu (1967)
- Bangarada Kalasha (1995)
- Bangarada Mane (1996)
- Bangaradantha Maga (1991)
- Banagaram (2006)
- Bangarda Kural (2012)
- Bangari: (1963 & 2013)
- Bangarraju (2022)
- Bangaru Babu: 1973 & 2009)
- Bangaru Bullodu (2021)
- Bangaru Gaajulu (1968)
- Bangaru Kanuka (1982)
- Bangaru Kodipetta (2014)
- Bangaru Kutumbam (1994)
- Bangaru Manishi (1976)
- Bangaru Panjaram (1969)
- Bangaru Papa (1955)
- Bangaru Pichika (1968)
- Bangarwadi (1995)
- Banger (2022)
- The Banger Sisters (2002)
- Bangers: (1995 & 1999)
- Bangistan (2015)
- Bangkok Dangerous: (1999 & 2008)
- Bangkok Haunted (2001)
- Bangkok Loco (2004)
- Bangkok Love Story (2007)
- Bangkok Traffic (Love) Story (2009)
- Bangla (2019)
- Banglar Badhu (1998)
- Bangles (2013)
- Banished (2007)
- The Banishing (2020)
- Banjo: (1947 & 2016)
- Banjo in My Knee (1936)
- Banjo the Woodpile Cat (1979)
- Bank (2009)
- The Bank Dick (1940)
- The Bank Job (2008)
- The Banker: (2015 & 2020)
- Banksy Does New York (2014)
- Banna Bannada Loka (2011)
- Bannerghatta (2021)
- Banning (1967)
- The Banquet: (1991 & 2006)
- Bansari (1943)
- Banshee (2006 TV)
- Bansuri: The Flute (2021)
- Bansuri Guru (2013)
- Banta ng Kahapon (1977)
- Banthi Poola Janaki (2016)
- Bantú Mama (2021)
- Banzai (1997)

==== Bao–Bar ====
- Bao (2018)
- Baober in Love (2004)
- Bapi Bari Jaa (2012)
- Baptism of Blood (2006)
- Baptism of Fire (1940)
- Baptism of Fire (1943)
- Baptism of Fire (1952)
- Baptists at Our Barbecue (2004)
- The Bar (2017)
- Bar 20 (1943)
- Bar 20 Justice (1938)
- Bar 20 Rides Again (1935)
- Bar 51 (1986)
- Bar-B-Que Movie (1988)
- Bar Boys (2017)
- Bar Boys: After School (2025)
- The Bar C Mystery (1926)
- The Bar at the Crossing (1972)
- Bar Girls (1994)
- Bar Hopping (2002)
- The Bar Sinister (1917)
- Bar Sport (2011)
- Bar-Z Bad Men (1937)
- Bara (1982)
- Bara (1999)
- Bara Aadmi (1981)
- Barabbas: (1953, 1961 & 2012)
- Baraka (1992)
- Barakah Meets Barakah (2016)
- Barakat (2020)
- Barakat! (2006)
- Baran (2001)
- Barat (1942)
- Barata Ribeiro, 716 (2016)
- Barati (1954)
- Barb and Star Go to Vista Del Mar (2021)
- Barb Wire: (1922 & 1996)
- Barbados Quest (1955)
- Barbara: (1961, 1997, 2012 & 2017)
- Bárbara (1980)
- Barbara the Fair with the Silken Hair (1969)
- Barbara Frietchie: (1915 & 1924)
- Barbarella (1968)
- Barbarian (2022)
- The Barbarian: (1920 & 1933)
- The Barbarian and the Geisha (1958)
- The Barbarian Invasions (2003)
- Barbarian Queen (1985)
- Barbarians (1953)
- Barbarians (2021)
- The Barbarians (1987)
- Barbarians of the Bay (2019)
- Barabarians at the Gate (1993 TV)
- Barbarossa (2009)
- Barbary Coast (1935)
- Barbary Coast Bunny (1956)
- Barbary Coast Gent (1944)
- Barbary Pirate (1949)
- Barbary Sheep (1917)
- Barbecue (2014)
- Barbed Wire: (1927 & 1952)
- Barber (2023)
- The Barber (1916)
- The Barber (2014)
- The Barber of Birmingham (2011)
- The Barber and the Farmer (1897)
- The Barber of Little Rock (2023)
- The Barber of the Poor District (1982)
- The Barber of Rio (1996)
- The Barber of Seville: (1904, 1933, 1938, 1944, 1947, 1948 & 1958 TV)
- The Barber Shop (1933)
- The Barber of Siberia (1998)
- The Barber of Stamford Hill (1962)
- Barber's Tales (2013)
- Berberian Sound Studio (2012)
- Barbershop series:
  - Barbershop (2002)
  - Barbershop: The Next Cut (2016)
  - Barbershop 2: Back in Business (2004)
- The Barbershop (1894)
- Barbie series:
  - Barbie in the Nutcracker (2001)
  - Barbie as Rapunzel (2002)
  - Barbie of Swan Lake (2003)
  - Barbie as the Princess and the Pauper (2004)
  - Barbie: Fairytopia (2005)
  - Barbie and the Magic of Pegasus (2005)
  - Barbie: Mermaidia (2006)
  - The Barbie Diaries (2006)
  - Barbie in the 12 Dancing Princesses (2006)
  - Barbie as the Island Princess (2007)
  - Barbie Mariposa (2008)
  - Barbie & the Diamond Castle (2008)
  - Barbie Thumbelina (2009)
  - Barbie and the Three Musketeers (2009)
  - Barbie in A Mermaid Tale (2010)
  - Barbie: A Fashion Fairytale (2010)
  - Barbie: A Fairy Secret (2011)
  - Barbie: Princess Charm School (2011)
  - Barbie in A Mermaid Tale 2 (2012)
  - Barbie: The Princess & the Popstar (2012)
  - Barbie and the Secret Door (2014)
  - Barbie: Star Light Adventure (2016)
  - Barbie: Dolphin Magic (2017)
  - Barbie (2023)
- Barcelona (1994)
- Barcelona: A Love Untold (2016)
- The Barcelona Vampiress (2020)
- Barcelone, Parc au crépuscule (1904)
- The Bard (TBD)
- Bardelys the Magnificent (1926)
- Bardo (2016)
- Bardo, False Chronicle of a Handful of Truths (2022)
- Bare (2015)
- Bare Behind Bars (1980)
- Bare Essentials (1991 TV)
- Bare-Fisted Gallagher (1919)
- Bare Fists (1919)
- The Bare-Footed Kid (1993)
- Bare Knuckles (1977)
- Bare på jobb (2003)
- Baree, Son of Kazan: (1918 & 1925)
- Barefoot: (2005 & 2014)
- Barefoot in Athens (1966 TV)
- Barefoot Boy (1938)
- The Barefoot Boy (1923)
- The Barefoot Contessa (1954)
- Barefoot at Dawn (2017)
- A Barefoot Dream (2010)
- The Barefoot Emperor (2019)
- The Barefoot Executive (1971)
- Barefoot to Goa (2015)
- Barefoot to Herat (2002)
- Barefoot to Jerusalem (2008)
- Barefoot Ki-bong (2006)
- The Barefoot Mailman (1951)
- Barefoot in the Park (1967)
- Barefoot Savage (1952)
- Barefoot Sultan (1956)
- Barefooted Youth (1964)
- Bareilly Ki Barfi (2017)
- Barely Legal (2011)
- Barely Lethal (2015)
- Barenaked in America (1999)
- Barfi! (2012)
- Barfly (1987)
- Barfuss (2005)
- The Bargain (1914)
- The Bargain (1921)
- The Bargain (1931)
- Bargain with Bullets (1937)
- Bargain Day (1931)
- The Bargee (1964)
- Bari Theke Paliye (1958)
- Baring It All (2011)
- Barista (2015)
- Baristas (2019)
- Bark! (2002)
- Barke (2014)
- The Barker (1928)
- The Barkleys of Broadway (1949)
- Barkha (1959)
- Barkha Bahar (1973)
- Barkhaa (2015)
- Barking Dogs Never Bite (2000)
- Barking at the Stars (1998)
- Barking Water (2009)
- The Barkleys of Broadway (1949)
- Barmaid (1922)
- The Barn (2016)
- Barn av solen (1955)
- Barn Burning (1980)
- The Barn Dance (1929)
- Barnabé (1938)
- Barnaby Lee (1917)
- Barnaby and Me (1978 TV)
- Barnaby Rudge (1915)
- Barnacle Bill: (1930, 1935, 1941 & 1957)
- Barnen från Frostmofjället (1945)
- Barnet Horse Fair (1896)
- Barney's Great Adventure (1998)
- Barney's Version (2010)
- The Barnstormer (1922)
- Barnyard (2006)
- The Barnyard (1923)
- The Barnyard Battle (1929)
- The Barnyard Broadcast (1931)
- The Barnyard Concert (1930)
- A Barnyard Frolic (1925)
- The Baron (2011)
- The Baron of Arizona (1950)
- Baron Blood (1972)
- The Baron and the Kid (1984 TV)
- The Baron of the Locks (1960)
- The Baroness and the Butler (1938)
- The Baroness and the Pig (2002)
- The Barons (2009)
- Barque sortant du port (1895)
- Barrabas (1920)
- The Barracks (1999)
- The Barred Road (1958)
- A Barrel Full of Dollars (1971)
- The Barren Gain (1915)
- The Barrens (2012)
- The Barretts of Wimpole Street: (1934 & 1957)
- The Barricade (1917)
- The Barricade (1921)
- Barrier (1966)
- The Barrier (1917)
- The Barrier (1926)
- The Barrier (1937)
- The Barrier (1979)
- The Barrier (1990)
- The Barrier of Flames (1914)
- The Barrings (1955)
- Barry: (1949 & 2016)
- Barry Lyndon (1975)
- Barsaat: (1949 & 1995)
- Barsaat Ki Ek Raat (1981)
- Bart Got a Room (2009)
- The Bartered Bride: (1932 & 1960)
- The Bartered Crown (1914)
- Bartleby: (1970, 1976 & 2001)
- Bartok the Magnificent (1999)
- Barton Fink (1991)
- The Barton Mystery: (1920, 1932 & 1949)
- Barun Rai and the House on the Cliff (2021)

==== Bas ====
- Bas Ek Chance (2015)
- Bas Ek Pal (2006)
- Bas Itna Sa Khwaab Hai (2001)
- Bas Yun Hi (2003)
- Basant (1942)
- Basant Bahar (1956)
- Basanta Bilap (1973)
- Bansata Utsav (2013)
- Banshee Chapter (2013)
- The Banshees of Inisherin (2022)
- Basanti (2000)
- Basanti Tangewali (1992)
- Baseball Bugs (1946)
- Baseball Girl (2019)
- Baseball Punx (2017)
- Based Down South (2010)
- Based on the Novel (1999)
- Based on a True Story (2017)
- BASEketball (1998)
- Basement (2010)
- Basement (2014)
- The Basement (2017)
- Basement Jack (2009)
- Bashful (1917)
- Bashful Anton (1940)
- Bashful Buccaneer (1925)
- Bashful Felix (1934)
- Bashing (2005)
- Bashu, the Little Stranger (1986)
- Basic: (2003 & 2026)
- Basic Instinct (1992)
- Basic Instinct 2 (2006)
- Basic Love (2009)
- Basket Case series:
  - Basket Case (1982)
  - Basket Case 2 (1990)
  - Basket Case 3: The Progeny (1992)
- The Basketball Diaries (1995)
- Basquiat (1996)
- Bastard: (1940 & 1997)
- The Bastard: (1954, 1963 & 1978 TV)
- Bastard Out of Carolina (1996)
- Bastards: (2006 & 2013)
- Bastille Day: (1933 & 2016)

==== Bat ====
- The Bat: (1926 & 1959)
- The Bat People (1974)
- Bat Pussy (1970s)
- Bat Thumb (2001)
- The Bat Whispers (1930)
- Bat Wings (1992)
- Bat*21 (1988)
- Bataan (1943)
- Bataille de boules de neige (1896)
- A Batalha do Passinho (2012)
- Batas Militar (1997)
- Batata (2022)
- Batch '81 (1982)
- Bateau-mouche sur la Seine (1896)
- Bates Motel (1987 TV)
- The Bath in the Barn: (1943 & 1956)
- A Bath House Beauty (1914)
- Bath Salt Zombies (2013)
- Bathing Beauty (1944)
- Bathing Buddies (1946)
- Bathing Franky (2012)
- Bathory (2008)
- Bathtime in Clerkenwell (2002)
- The Bathtub (2016)
- Bathtubs Over Broadway (2018)
- Batkid Begins (2015)
- Batman series:
  - Batman Dracula (1964)
  - Batman: (1966 & 1989)
  - Batman Fights Dracula (1967)
  - Batman Returns (1992)
  - Batman: Mask of the Phantasm (1993)
  - Batman Forever (1995)
  - Batman & Robin (1997)
  - Batman & Mr. Freeze: SubZero (1998)
  - Batman Beyond: Return of the Joker (2000)
  - Batman: Mystery of the Batwoman (2003)
  - Batman Begins (2005)
  - The Batman vs. Dracula (2005)
  - Batman: New Times (2005)
  - Batman: Gotham Knight (2008)
  - Batman: Under the Red Hood (2010)
  - Batman: Year One (2011)
  - Batman: Assault on Arkham (2014)
  - Batman Unlimited: Animal Instincts (2015)
  - Batman Unlimited: Monster Mayhem (2015)
  - Batman: Bad Blood (2016)
  - Batman: The Killing Joke (2016)
  - Batman v Superman: Dawn of Justice (2016)
  - Batman Unlimited: Mechs vs. Mutants (2016)
  - Batman: Return of the Caped Crusaders (2016)
  - Batman and Harley Quinn (2017)
  - Batman vs. Two-Face (2017)
  - Batman: Gotham by Gaslight (2018)
  - Batman Ninja (2018)
  - Batman: Hush (2019)
  - Batman vs. Teenage Mutant Ninja Turtles (2019)
  - Batman: The Long Halloween, Part One (2021)
  - Batman: The Long Halloween, Part Two (2021)
  - The Batman (2022)
- Bato sa Buhangin (1976)
- Bato: The General Ronald dela Rosa Story (2019)
- Baton (2009)
- Baton Baton Mein (1979)
- Baton Bunny (1959)
- Baton Rouge (1988)
- Bats (1999)
- Bats in the Belfry (1942)
- Bats: Human Harvest (2007)
- Batsu Game 2 (2012)
- Battal Gazi Destanı (1971)
- Battalion: (1927, 1937 & 2015)
- Battalion 609 (2019)
- The Battalion in the Shadows (1957)
- Battered (1989 TV)
- The Battered Bastards of Baseball (2014)
- Batteries Not Included (1987)
- The Battery (2012)
- Batteuse à vapeur (1896)
- Batti Gul Meter Chalu (2018)
- Battle (2018)
- The Battle: (1911, 1923 & 1934)
- The Battle Against Berlin (1926)
- The Battle of Algiers (1966)
- The Battle at Apache Pass (1952)
- The Battle of Bademunde (1931)
- The Battle for Barking (2010)
- Battle Beneath the Earth (1967)
- The Battle Between the Burps and Farts (2004)
- Battle Beyond the Stars (1980)
- Battle Beyond the Sun (1959)
- The Battle of Bhima Koregaon: An Unending Journey (2017)
- Battle at Big Rock (2019)
- Battle of Blood Island (1960)
- Battle at Bloody Beach (1961)
- The Battle of Brains (1941)
- Battle of Britain (1969)
- Battle for Brooklyn (2011)
- Battle of the Bulge: (1965 & 1991)
- The Battle of the Bulge... The Brave Rifles (1965)
- The Battle of Bull Run (1913)
- The Battle of the Century (1927)
- Battle Circus (1953)
- Battle Cry (1955)
- The Battle Cry of Peace (1915)
- The Battle of El Alamein (1969)
- The Battle at Elderbush Gulch (1913)
- The Battle and Fall of Przemysl (1915)
- The Battle of Frenchman's Run (1915)
- The Battle of Gettysburg: (1913 & 1955)
- Battle Girl: The Living Dead in Tokyo Bay (1991)
- Battle for Haditha (2007)
- The Battle of the Harvests (1942)
- The Battle of Hearts (1916)
- Battle in Heaven (2005)
- The Battle of Hong Kong (1942)
- Battle Hymn (1957)
- The Battle of Jangsari (2019)
- The Battle of Kerzhenets (1971)
- The Battle for L.A.: Footsoldiers, Vol. 1 (2004)
- The Battle at Lake Changjin (2021)
- The Battle at Lake Changjin II (2022)
- The Battle of London (1941)
- Battle of Los Angeles (2011)
- The Battle of Love's Return (1971)
- Battle of Memories (2017)
- The Battle of Midway (1942)
- The Battle for Oil (1942)
- Battle in Outer Space (1959)
- The Battle Over Citizen Kane (1996 TV)
- The Battle of Paris (1929)
- Battle for the Planet of the Apes (1973)
- The Battle of Port Arthur (1980)
- The Battle of the Rails (1946)
- The Battle for the Republic of China (1981)
- The Battle of the River Plate (1956)
- The Battle of Rogue River (1954)
- The Battle Royal (1916)
- Battle Royale (2000)
- Battle Royale II: Requiem (2003)
- The Battle of San Pietro (1945)
- Battle Scars (2017)
- Battle in Seattle (2007)
- Battle of the Sexes: (1920, 1926 & 2017)
- The Battle of the Sexes: (1914, 1928 & 1959)
- The Battle of Shaker Heights (2003)
- The Battle of Sinai (1968)
- The Battle of the Somme (1916)
- Battle for Soviet Ukraine (1943)
- The Battle of Stalingrad (1949)
- Battle Stations (1956)
- Battle Taxi (1955)
- Battle for Terra (2007)
- The Battle of the Three Kings (1990)
- The Battle of Trafalgar (1911)
- The Battle of the Villa Fiorita (1965)
- The Battle of Waterloo (1913)
- A Battle of Wits: (1912 & 2006)
- The Battle Wizard (1977)
- Battle Zone (1952)
- Battle: Los Angeles (2011)
- The Battle: Roar to Victory (2019)
- Battlecreek (2017)
- Battledogs (2013 TV)
- Battlefield (2024)
- Battlefield America (2012)
- Battlefield Baseball (2003)
- Battlefield Constantinople (1970)
- Battlefield Earth (2000)
- Battlefield Heroes (2011)
- Battleground (1949)
- The Battles of Coronel and Falkland Islands (1927)
- Battles in the Shadow (1938)
- Battles Without Honor and Humanity series:
  - Battles Without Honor and Humanity (1973)
  - Battles Without Honor and Humanity: Deadly Fight in Hiroshima (1973)
  - Battles Without Honor and Humanity: Proxy War (1973)
  - Battles Without Honor and Humanity: Police Tactics (1974)
  - Battles Without Honor and Humanity: Final Episode (1974)
- Battleship (2012)
- The Battleship Island (2017)
- The Battleship Potemkin (1925)
- Battlestar Galactica (1979)
- Battling Bates (1923)
- Battling Bosko (1932)
- Battling Buckaroo (1932)
- Battling Buddy (1924)
- Battling with Buffalo Bill (1931)
- Battling Bunyan (1924)
- Battling Butler (1926)
- Battling Jane (1918)
- Battling Marshal (1950)
- Battling Mason (1924)
- The Battling Orioles (1924)
- Batton Story (1976)
- Batuque, the Soul of a People (2006)
- Batya (2021)
- Batya 2: Ded (2025)

==== Bau–Baz ====
- Bau Na Vichar (2019)
- Bauern erfüllen den Plan (1952)
- Bauerntanz zweier Kinder (1895)
- Bava Bavamaridi (1993)
- Bava Marudula Saval (1988)
- Bava Nachadu (2001)
- Bavagaru Bagunnara (1998)
- Bavathi (2019)
- Bavuttiyude Namathil (2012)
- Baw Baw Ka Htaw (2018)
- Bawa Duka (1997)
- Bawa Karma (1997)
- Bawa Thanthayar (1956)
- Bawal (2015)
- Bawal Na Gamot (1994)
- Bawali Unlimited (2012)
- Bawandar (2000)
- Bawarchi (1972)
- The Bawdy Adventures of Tom Jones (1976)
- Bawdy Tales (1973)
- Bawke (2005)
- Bawre Nain (1950)
- Baxter (1989)
- Baxter! (1973)
- The Baxter (2005)
- Baxter, Vera Baxter (1977)
- Baxu and the Giants (2019)
- The Bay (2012)
- Bay of All Saints (2012)
- Bay of Angels (1963)
- A Bay of Blood (1971)
- The Bay Boy (1984)
- The Bay of Death (1926)
- The Bay of Silence (2020)
- The Bay of St Michel (1963)
- Bayalu Daari (1976)
- Bayam Ariyaan (2010)
- Bayam Oru Payanam (2016)
- Bayama Irukku (2017)
- Bayaning 3rd World (1999)
- Bayasade Banda Bhagya (1977)
- Bayo (1985)
- Bayonet: (1936 & 2018)
- Bayside Shakedown series:
  - Bayside Shakedown (1998)
  - Bayside Shakedown 2 (2003)
  - Bayside Shakedown 3 (2010)
  - Bayside Shakedown: The Final (2012)
- The Baytown Outlaws (2012)
- Baywatch (2017)
- Baywatch: Hawaiian Wedding (2003)
- Baywatch the Movie: Forbidden Paradise (1995)
- Bazaar: (1949, 1982 & 2019)
- Bazaar Band Karo (1974)
- Bazaar E Husn (2014)
- Bazaar Rowdy (1988)

=== Bb–Bc ===
- Bbuddah... Hoga Terra Baap (2011)
- Bcuz of U (2004)

=== Be ===
- Be Beautiful But Shut Up (1958)
- Be Big! (1931)
- Be Careful (2011)
- Be Careful, Grandma! (1960)
- Be Careful, Mr. Smith (1935)
- Be Cool (2005)
- Be Dear to Me (1957)
- Be Forever Yamato (1980)
- Be Happy (2025)
- Be Here to Love Me (2004)
- Be Human (1936)
- Be Kind Rewind (2008)
- Be Like Others (2008)
- Be a Man! Samurai School (2008)
- Be the Man (2023)
- Be with Me (2005)
- Be My Cat: A Film for Anne (2015)
- Be My Guest (1965)
- Be My Husband (1981)
- Be My Slave (2012)
- Be My Wife: (1919 & 1921)
- Be Natural: The Untold Story of Alice Guy-Blaché (2018)
- Be Seeing You, Father (1948)
- Be Sick... It's Free (1968)
- Be Silent, My Sorrow, Be Silent (1918)
- Be Somebody: (2016 & 2021)
- Be Still (2021)
- Be Sure to Share (2009)
- Be There or Be Square (1998)
- Be Together (2015)
- Be True Until Death: (1936 & 1960)
- Be Up to Date (1938)
- Be Vaghte Talagh (2018)
- Be Wanton and Tread No Shame (1985)
- Be Water (2020)
- Be a Wicked Woman (1990)
- Be With You (2018)
- Be with You (2004)
- Be Your Age (1926)
- Be Yourself! (1930)
- Be-Imaan (1972)
- Be-Lagaam (2002)
- Be-Reham (1980)
- Be-Shaque (1981)

==== Bea ====
- The Beach: (1954 & 2000)
- Beach Blanket Bingo (1965)
- The Beach Bum (2019)
- Beach House: (1977 & 2018)
- The Beach House: (2018 TV & 2019)
- Beach Party (1963)
- Beaches (1988)
- The Beaches of Agnès (2008)
- The Beales of Grey Gardens (2006)
- Bean (1997)
- Beanpole (2019)
- Beans: (2000 & 2020)
- The Bear: (1938, 1984, 1988, 1998 TV & 2012)
- Bear Nation (2010)
- Bear Witness (2022)
- The Bears and I (1974)
- Beast: (2017, 2022 American, 2022 Indian & 2026)
- The Beast: (1974, 1975, 1988, 1996 TV & 2023)
- The Beast from 20,000 Fathoms (1953)
- Beast of Blood (1970)
- The Beast in the Jungle (2023)
- The Beast and the Magic Sword (1983)
- The Beast with Five Fingers (1946)
- The Beast Must Die: (1952 & 1974)
- The Beast Within: (1982 & 2024)
- Beast of the Yellow Night (1971)
- The Beast of Yucca Flats (1961)
- Beasties (1989)
- Beastly (2011)
- Beastly Boyz (2006)
- Beastmaster series:
  - The Beastmaster (1982)
  - Beastmaster 2: Through the Portal of Time (1991)
  - Beastmaster III: The Eye of Braxus (1996) (TV)
- Beasts of No Nation (2015)
- Beasts of the Southern Wild (2012)
- Beat the Devil (1953)
- The Beat Generation (1959)
- Beat Girl (1960)
- The Beat That My Heart Skipped (2005)
- Beatniks (1960)
- Beatrice Cenci: (1909, 1926, 1941, 1956 & 1969)
- Beatrice Wood: Mama of Dada (1993)
- Beatriz (1976)
- Beats (2019)
- Beau Brummell (1954)
- Beau Geste: (1926, 1939 & 1966)
- Beau Is Afraid (2023)
- Le Beau Serge (1958)
- Beau Travail (1999)
- Beaufort (2008)
- The Beautician and the Beast (1997)
- Beautiful: (2000, 2008, 2009 & 2011)
- Beautiful Boxer (2004)
- Beautiful Boy: (2010 & 2018)
- The Beautiful Country (2004)
- Beautiful Creatures: (2000 & 2013)
- The Beautiful and Damned (1923)
- Beautiful but Dangerous (1955)
- A Beautiful Day in the Neighborhood (2019)
- Beautiful Girls (1996)
- The Beautiful Hen Behind Yao Mountain (2019)
- The Beautiful Lie (1917)
- A Beautiful Mind (2001)
- A Beautiful New World (1999)
- Beautiful People (1999)
- Beautiful Thing (1996)
- Beauty and the Beast: (1934, 1946, 1962, 1978, 1983, 1987, 1991, 1992, 2005, 2009, 2014 & 2017)
- Beauty and the Beast: Belle's Magical World (1998)
- Beauty and the Beast: The Enchanted Christmas (1997)
- Beauty Day (2011)
- Beauty and the Devil (1950)
- The Beauty Jungle (1964)
- Beauty Parlor (1933)
- Beauty Shop (2005)
- The Beaver (2011)
- Beavis and Butt-head Do America (1996)
- Beavis and Butt-Head Do the Universe (2022)

==== Beb–Bec ====
- Beba (2021)
- Bebaak (2019)
- Bébé et fillettes (1896)
- Bebe's Kids (1992)
- Bebert and the Train (1963)
- Bebo's Girl (1963)
- Because (1918)
- Because of the Cats (1973)
- Because of Charley (2021)
- Because of a Flower (1967)
- Because He's My Friend (1979 TV)
- Because of Him (1946)
- Because I Hate Korea (2023)
- Because I Love Bad Weather (2024)
- Because I Love You: (1928 & 2017)
- Because I Said So (2007)
- Because Mommy Works (1994 TV)
- Because of That War (1988)
- Because They're Young (1960)
- Because We Are Girls (2019)
- Because Why (1993)
- Because of Winn-Dixie (2005)
- Because of a Woman (1917)
- Because of You (1952)
- Because You're Mine (1952)
- Becca (1989 TV)
- Becket: (1924 & 1964)
- Beckett (2021)
- Becky: (1927 & 2020)
- Becky & Badette (2023)
- Becky Sharp (1935)
- Becoming: (2020 documentary & 2020 horror)
- Becoming Ana (2024)
- Becoming Astrid (2018)
- Becoming Bond (2017)
- Becoming Colette (1991)
- Becoming Cousteau (2021)
- Becoming Dick (2000 TV)
- Becoming Human (2025)
- Becoming Jane (2007)
- Becoming Led Zeppelin (2025)
- Becoming Mike Nichols (2016)
- Becoming Mona (2021)
- Becoming Redwood (2012)
- Becoming Traviata (2012)
- Becoming Warren Buffett (2017)
- Becoming Zlatan (2015)

==== Bed ====
- Bed and Board (1970)
- Bed & Breakfast: (1992 & 2010)
- Bed and Breakfast: (1930 & 1938)
- Bed of Lies (1992)
- Bed Rest (2022)
- Bed of Roses: (1933 & 1996)
- The Bed Sitting Room (1969)
- Bed and Sofa (1927)
- Bed for Two; Rendezvous with Luck (1950)
- Bed of Thorns (2019)
- Bedara Kannappa (1954)
- Bedardi (1993)
- Bedazzled: (1967 & 2000)
- Beddegama (1980)
- Bedelia (1946)
- Beder Meye Josna (1989)
- Bedevil (1993)
- Bedeviled (2016)
- Bedevilled: (1955 & 2010)
- The Bedevilled (1974)
- Bedevilled Rabbit (1957)
- The Bedford Incident (1966)
- Bednead (1991)
- Bedknobs and Broomsticks (1971)
- Bedlam: (1946 & 2019)
- The Bedroom Window: (1924 & 1987)
- Bedrooms (2010)
- Bedrooms and Hallways (1998)
- Bedside Manner (1945)
- Bedtime for Bonzo (1951)
- Bedtime with Rosie (1975)
- Bedtime Stories (2008)
- Bedtime Story: (1938, 1941 & 1964)

==== Bee–Beh ====
- Bee at the Beach (1950)
- Bee on Guard (1951)
- Bee Movie (2007)
- Bee Season (2005)
- Beedala Patlu (1972)
- Beedi Basavanna (1967)
- Beedi Kunjamma (1982)
- Beef: (2003 & 2025)
- Beef and the Banana (1951)
- Beefcake (1999)
- The Beekeeper (2024)
- Been Down So Long It Looks Like Up to Me (1971)
- Been So Long (2018)
- Beena (1978)
- Beep, Beep (1952)
- Beep: A Documentary History of Game Sound (2016)
- Beep Prepared (1961)
- Beeper (2002)
- Beer (1985)
- Beer League (2006)
- Beer for My Heroes (2008)
- Beer Wars (2009)
- Beerfest (2006)
- Bees Make Honey (2017)
- Bees Saal Baad: (1962 & 1989)
- Beeswax (2009)
- Beethoven series:
  - Beethoven (1992)
  - Beethoven's 2nd (1993)
  - Beethoven's 3rd (2000)
  - Beethoven's 4th (2001)
  - Beethoven's 5th (2003)
  - Beethoven's Big Break (2008)
- Beethoven Lives Upstairs (1992) (TV)
- Beethoven's Great Love (1936)
- Beethoven's Nephew (1985)
- Beetlejuice (1988)
- Beetlejuice Beetlejuice (2024)
- Beeveema (2023)
- Beezy Bear (1955)
- Befaam (2021)
- Before and After (1996)
- Before Anything You Say (2017)
- Before Born (2005)
- Before Breakfast (1919)
- Before Dawn (1933)
- Before the Devil Knows You're Dead (2007)
- Before the Fall: (2004 & 2015)
- Before Flying Back to Earth (2005)
- Before God and Man (1955)
- Before Him All Rome Trembled (1946)
- Before I Die (2022)
- Before I Disappear (2014)
- Before I Fall (2017)
- Before I Forget (2007)
- Before I Go to Sleep (2014)
- Before I Hang (1940)
- Before I Self Destruct (2009)
- Before I Sleep (2013)
- Before I Wake: (1955 & 2016)
- Before It Had a Name (2005)
- Before Marriage (2024)
- Before Midnight: (1925 & 1933)
- Before Morning (1933)
- Before My Heart Falls (2012)
- Before Night Falls (2000)
- Before, Now & Then (2022)
- Before the Rain: (1994 & 2010)
- Before series:
  - Before Sunrise (1995)
  - Before Sunset (2004)
  - Before Midnight (2013)
- Before Stonewall (1984)
- Before Sundown (1956)
- Before Sunrise (1989)
- Before This Night Is Over (1966)
- Before Tomorrow (2008)
- Before Twilight (2008)
- Before We Go (2014)
- Beg, Borrow or Steal (1937)
- Begaana: (1963 & 1986)
- The Beggar (1983)
- Beggar on Horseback (1925)
- The Beggar's Daughter (1950)
- Beggar's Holiday (1934)
- The Beggar's Opera (1953)
- Beggar's Wedding (1936)
- Beggars in Ermine (1934)
- Beggars of Life (1928)
- Begging for Love (1998)
- Begin Again (2013)
- Begin the Beguine (1982)
- A Beginner's Guide to Endings (2010)
- Beginner's Luck: (1935 & 2001)
- Beginners (2010)
- Beginning: (2020 & 2023)
- Beginning of the End (1957)
- Begotten (1989)
- The Beguiled: (1971 & 2017)
- Begum Jaan: (1977 & 2017)
- Behan Bhai: (1968 & 1979)
- Behave Yourself! (1951)
- Behaving Badly (2014)
- Behavior (2014)
- Beheading (2025)
- Behemoth: (2011 TV & 2015)
- Behemoth: Or the Game of God (2016)
- Behen Hogi Teri (2017)
- Behind City Lights (1945)
- Behind Closed Doors: (1929, 1961, 2003, 2008, 2014 & 2022)
- Behind the Curve (2018)
- Behind Enemy Lines series:
  - Behind Enemy Lines (2001)
  - Behind Enemy Lines: Colombia (2009)
  - Behind Enemy Lines II: Axis of Evil (2006)
- Behind the Green Door (1972)
- Behind the High Wall (1956)
- Behind the Lines: (1916 & 1997)
- Behind the Mask: (1932, 1946, 1958, 2002, 2006 & 2021)
- Behind the Mask: The Rise of Leslie Vernon (2006)
- Behind the Red Door (2003)
- Behind the Screen (1916)
- Behind Stone Walls (1932)
- Behind the Sun (2001)
- Behold My Wife!: (1920 & 1934)
- Behold a Pale Horse (1964)

==== Bei ====
- Beijing Bastards (1993)
- Beijing Bicycle (2001)
- Beijing Love Story (2014)
- Beijing Rocks (2001)
- Beijing Spring (2021)
- The Being (1983)
- Being Canadian (2015)
- Being Caribou (2005)
- Being Charlie (2015)
- Being Claudine (2000)
- Being Cyrus (2006)
- Being Different (1981)
- Being Elmo: A Puppeteer's Journey (2011)
- Being Evel (2015)
- Being Flynn (2012)
- Being Frank (2018)
- Being Ginger (2013)
- Being at Home with Claude (1992)
- Being Human: (1994 & 2010)
- Being Impossible (2018)
- Being Jacques Chirac (2006)
- Being Jewish in France (2007 TV)
- Being John Malkovich (1999)
- Being Julia (2004)
- Being Maria (2024)
- Being Mary Tyler Moore (2023)
- Being Michael Madsen (2007)
- Being Mick (2001 TV)
- Being Mortal (2023)
- Being Mrs Elliot (2014)
- Being or Not Being (2015)
- Being Osama (2004)
- Being Respectable (1924)
- Being the Ricardos (2021)
- Being Rose (2017)
- Being There (1979)
- Being Twenty (1978)
- Being Two Isn't Easy (1962)
- Being in the World (2010)
- Beings (1998)
- Beirut (2018)
- Beirut: The Last Home Movie (1987)

==== Bej–Ber ====
- Bejawada (2011)
- Bekas (2012)
- Bekhudi: (1992 & 2021)
- Bekikang: Ang Nanay Kong Beki (2013)
- Beks Days of Our Lives (2023)
- Bela Lugosi Meets a Brooklyn Gorilla (1952)
- The Beldham (2025)
- Belfast (2021)
- The Believer (2001)
- The Believers (1987)
- Believers (2007)
- The Belko Experiment (2016)
- The Bell from Hell (1973)
- Bell of Purity Temple (1992)
- Bell, Book and Candle (1958)
- Bella (2007)
- Belladonna of Sadness (1973)
- The Bellboy (1960)
- The Bellboy and the Playgirls (1962)
- Belle: (1973, 2013 & 2021)
- Belle de jour (1967)
- Belle of the Nineties (1934)
- La Belle Noiseuse (1991)
- Belle Toujours (2006)
- The Belles of St. Clements (1936)
- The Belles of St. Trinian's (1954)
- Belles on Their Toes (1952)
- Bellflower (2011)
- The Bellman (1945)
- Bellman and True (1987)
- The Bells: (1926 & 1931)
- Bells from the Deep: Faith and Superstition in Russia (1993)
- The Bells of St. Mary's (1945)
- Belly (1998)
- The Belly of an Architect (1987)
- Belly of the Beast (2003)
- Bellyfruit (1999)
- Bellyful (2000)
- The Beloved: (1940, 1991, & 2015)
- Beloved: (1934, 1998, & 2011)
- Below (2002)
- Below Her Mouth (2016)
- Below the Belt (1980)
- Belphegor, Ghost of the Louvre (2001)
- Belzebuth (2017)
- Ben 10 series:
  - Ben 10: Race Against Time (2007)
  - Ben 10: Alien Swarm (2009)
  - Ben 10: Destroy All Aliens (2012)
  - Ben 10 Versus the Universe: The Movie (2020)
- Ben and Me (1953)
- Ben X (2007)
- Ben-Hur: (1907, 1959, 2003 & 2016)
- Ben-Hur: A Tale of the Christ (1925)
- Benaam (2006)
- The Benchwarmers (2006)
- Bend It Like Beckham (2002)
- Bend of the River (1952)
- Bending the Rules (2012)
- Bendito infierno (2001)
- Beneath the 12-Mile Reef (1953)
- Beneath Clouds (2002)
- Beneath the Darkness (2012)
- Beneath the Leaves (2019)
- Beneath the Planet of the Apes (1970)
- Beneath Still Waters (2006)
- Beneath the Valley of the Ultra-Vixens (1979)
- Benedetta (2021)
- Benediction (2021)
- Benji series:
  - Benji: (1974 & 2018)
  - For the Love of Benji (1977)
  - Benji's Very Own Christmas Story (1978)
  - Oh! Heavenly Dog (1980)
  - Benji the Hunted (1987)
  - Benji: Off the Leash! (2004)
- Benny & Joon (1993)
- Benny's Video (1992)
- Bent (1997)
- Beongeoli Sam-ryong (1929)
- Beowulf: (1999 & 2007)
- Beowulf & Grendel (2006)
- Bepanaah (1985)
- Beparoyaa (2016)
- Beporowa (2019)
- Bequest to the Nation (1973)
- Berberian Sound Studio (2012)
- Bereavement (2010)
- Beregis Avtomobilya (1966)
- Bergman Island (2021)
- Berkeley Square (1933)
- Berlin Alexanderplatz: (1931, 1980 TV & 2020)
- Berlin Express (1948)
- The Berlin File (2013)
- Berlin, I Love You (2019)
- Berlin: Symphony of a Metropolis (1927)
- The Bermuda Depths (1978)
- The Bermuda Triangle (1978)
- Bernard and the Genie (1991) (TV)
- Bernie: (1996 & 2011)
- Berserker (2001)

==== Bes ====
- Besa e kuqe (1982)
- Besa: The Promise (2012)
- Besahara (1987)
- Besame Mucho (1987)
- Besharam: (1978 & 2013)
- Beshkempir (1998)
- Beside Me (2018)
- Beside Still Waters (2014)
- Besieged (1998)
- Bessie (2015 TV)
- Best (2000)
- Best Actor (2010)
- Best of the Best series:
  - Best of the Best (1989)
  - Best of the Best II (1993)
  - Best of the Best 3: No Turning Back (1995)
  - Best of the Best 4: Without Warning (1998)
- Best of the Best (1992)
- Best Boy: (1979 & 2025)
- Best. Christmas. Ever! (2023)
- Best Defense (1984)
- Best Enemies Forever (2016)
- Best of Enemies: (1933 & 2015)
- The Best of Enemies: (1961 & 2019)
- The Best Exotic Marigold Hotel (2012)
- Best Foot Forward (1943)
- Best Friend (2020)
- Best Friend Forgotten (2004)
- Best Friends: (1975 & 1982)
- Best F(r)iends (2017)
- Best Guy (1990)
- Best in Hell (2022)
- Best: His Mother's Son (2009 TV)
- The Best Intentions (1992)
- Best Kept Secret (2013 TV)
- Best Laid Plans: (1999 & 2012)
- The Best Little Whorehouse in Texas (1982)
- Best of Luck: (2010 & 2013)
- Best of Luck Laalu (2017)
- The Best Man: (1964, 1998, 1999 & 2005)
- Best Man Down (2012)
- Best Man Wins (1948)
- Best Men (1997)
- Best and Most Beautiful Things (2016)
- Best Night Ever (2013)
- The Best Offer (2013)
- The Best Plan Is No Plan (2013)
- Best Seller (1987)
- Best Sellers (2021)
- Best in Show (2000)
- Best Summer Ever (2020)
- The Best of Times: (1981 TV, 1986 & 2002)
- Best Wishes to All (2023)
- Best Wishes for Tomorrow (2007)
- Best Worst Movie (2009)
- Best Worst Thing That Ever Could Have Happened (2016)
- The Best Years of Our Lives (1946)
- The Best of Youth (2003)
- Bestia: (1917 & 2021)
- La Bestia in calore (1977)
- Bestie (2022)
- Bestman: 4 Better, Not 4 Worse (2002)
- Bestseller (2010)
- Besty (2025)
- Besuge (1976)

==== Bet–Bev ====
- The Bet: (1997 & 2006)
- Bet on Friendship (2021)
- Bet, Queen of Jordan (1924)
- Beta (1992)
- Beta Ho To Aisa (1994)
- Beta Test (2016)
- The Beta Test (2021)
- Betaab (1983)
- Betaabi (1997)
- Betaaj Badshah (1994)
- Bete: (1986 & 2011)
- La Bête (1975)
- La Bête Humaine (1938)
- Betelnut Beauty (2001)
- Bethany (2017)
- Bethlehem (2013)
- Bethesda (TBD)
- Bethune (1965 TV)
- Bethune: The Making of a Hero (1990)
- Beti: (1964 & 1969)
- Beti No.1 (2000)
- Betrayal: (1929, 1932, 1974 TV, 1978 TV, 1981, 1983, 1993, 2009, 2012 & 2023)
- The Betrayal: (1948 & 1957)
- Betrayal of the Dove (1993)
- Betrayal from the East (1945)
- Betrayed: (1917, 1954, 1988 & 2020)
- The Betrayed (1993 & 2008)
- Betrayed by a Handprint (1908)
- Betrayed Women (1955)
- The Betsy (1978)
- Betsy's Wedding (1990)
- A Better Life (2011)
- Better Living Through Chemistry (2014)
- Better Living Through Circuitry (1999)
- Better Luck Tomorrow (2002)
- Better Man (2024)
- Better Nate Than Ever (2022)
- Better Off Dead (1985)
- A Better Place (1997)
- Better Than Chocolate (1999)
- A Better Tomorrow (1986)
- A Better Tomorrow II (1987)
- Better Watch Out (2016)
- Bettie Page: Dark Angel (2004)
- Betty (1992)
- Betty Blue (1986)
- The Betty Boop Movie Mystery (1989)
- Between Love and Hate (2006)
- Between Rings (2014)
- Between Showers (1914)
- Between Time and Eternity (1956)
- Between Time and Timbuktu (1972) (TV)
- Between Two Ferns: The Movie (2019)
- Between Two Women: (1937, 1945, 1986 TV & 2000)
- Between Two Worlds: (1919 & 1944)
- Between Us Girls (1942)
- Beur sur la ville (2011)
- Le Beurre et l'argent du beurre (2007)
- Beuys (2017)
- The Beverly Hillbillies (1993)
- Beverly Hills Bodysnatchers (1989)
- Beverly Hills Brats (1989)
- Beverly Hills Chihuahua series:
  - Beverly Hills Chihuahua (2008)
  - Beverly Hills Chihuahua 2 (2011)
  - Beverly Hills Chihuahua 3: Viva la Fiesta! (2012)
- Beverly Hills Cop series:
  - Beverly Hills Cop (1984)
  - Beverly Hills Cop II (1987)
  - Beverly Hills Cop III (1994)
  - Beverly Hills Cop: Axel F (2024)
- Beverly Hills Family Robinson (1997) (TV)
- Beverly Hills Madam (1986) (TV)
- Beverly Hills Ninja (1997)
- Beverly Hills Vamp (1988)
- Bevu Bella (1963)
- Bevu Bella (1993)

==== Bew–Bez ====
- Bewafa (1952)
- Bewafa Sanam (1995)
- Bewafaa (2005)
- Bewafai (1985)
- Bewaffa Se Waffa (1992)
- Beware (1946)
- Beware Boiúna (2026)
- Beware of Children (2019)
- Beware of a Holy Whore (1971)
- Beware, My Lovely (1952)
- Beware! The Blob (1972)
- Beware! Children at Play (1989)
- Bewitched: (1945 & 2005)
- Bewitching Attraction (2006)
- Beyond: (1921, 2010, 2012 & 2014)
- The Beyond (1981)
- Beyond and Back (1978)
- Beyond the Black Rainbow (2010)
- Beyond Borders (2003)
- Beyond the Clouds: (1995 & 2017)
- Beyond the Darkness (1984)
- Beyond the Door: (1974 & 1982)
- Beyond the Door II (1977)
- Beyond the Door III (1989)
- Beyond the Forest (1949)
- Beyond the Gates (2006)
- Beyond Good and Evil (1977)
- Beyond Hatred (2005)
- Beyond the Hill (2012)
- Beyond the Hills (2012)
- Beyond the Last Mountain (1976)
- Beyond the Law: (1934, 1968 American, 1968 Italian, 1993 TV & 2019)
- Beyond the Lights (2014)
- Beyond the Mat (1999)
- Beyond the Poseidon Adventure (1979)
- Beyond the Rainbow (1922)
- Beyond Rangoon (1995)
- Beyond Re-Animator (2003)
- Beyond the Reach (2014)
- Beyond a Reasonable Doubt: (1956 & 2009)
- Beyond the Rocks (1922)
- Beyond the Sea: (1991 & 2004)
- Beyond This Place (1959)
- Beyond the Time Barrier (1960)
- Beyond Tomorrow (1940)
- Beyond the Valley of the Dolls (1970)
- Beyond the Years (2007)
- Bezawada Bebbuli (1983)
- Bezeten, Het Gat in de Muur (1969)
- Bezubaan (1982)
- Bezubaan Ishq (2015)

=== Bf ===
- BFF: Best Friends Forever (2009)
- BFFs (2014)
- The BFG: (1989 & 2016)

=== Bh ===
==== Bha ====
- Bhaag Johnny (2015)
- Bhaag Milkha Bhaag (2013)
- Bhaag Saale (2023)
- Bhaaga Pirivinai (1959)
- Bhaagamathie (2018)
- Bhaagyavaan (1993)
- Bhaangarh (2014)
- Bhaari Bharjari Bete (1981)
- Bhaarya Illaatha Raathri (1975)
- Bhaaryaavijayam (1977)
- Bhaaryaye Aavashyamundu (1975)
- Bhaaryayum Kaamukiyum (1978)
- Bhabhi: (1938, 1957 & 1991)
- Bhabhi Ki Chudiyan (1961)
- Bhadaas (2013)
- Bhadra: (2005 & 2011)
- Bhadrachalam (2001)
- Bhadrachitta (1989)
- Bhadradeepam (1973)
- Bhadradri Ramudu (2004)
- Bhadrakali (1976)
- Bhadram Koduko (1992)
- Bhag Khesari Bhag (2019)
- Bhagam Bhag (2006)
- Bhagavad Gita (1993)
- Bhagavadajjukam (2021)
- Bhagavan: (1986 & 2009)
- Bhagavanth Kesari (2023)
- Bhagawan (2004)
- Bhaageeratha (2005)
- Bhagini Nivedita (1962)
- Bhagirathi (2012)
- Bhagmati (2005)
- Bhagta Bhoot (1943)
- Bhagwaan Dada (1986)
- Bhagwan Bharose (2023)
- Bhagwan Parshuram (1970)
- Bhagya Chakramu (1968)
- Bhagya Debata (1995)
- Bhagya Devathai (1959)
- Bhagya Jyothi (1975)
- Bhagya Laxmi (1944)
- Bhagya Rekha (1957)
- Bhagyada Bagilu (1968)
- Bhagyada Balegara (2009)
- Bhagyada Lakshmi Baramma (1986)
- Bhagyadevatha (2009)
- Bhagyajathakam (1962)
- Bhagyalakshmi (1961)
- Bhagyamudra (1967)
- Bhagyanagara Veedullo Gamattu (2019)
- Bhagyavantha (1981)
- Bhagyawan (1993)
- Bhagyodaya (1956)
- Bhai's Cafe (2019)
- Bharathi Kannamma (1999)

==== Bhe ====
- Bhedi Khazana (1946)
- Bhediya (2022)
- Bheed (2023)
- Bheegi Palkein (1982)
- Bheegi Raat (1965)
- Bheekara Nimishangal (1970)
- Bheekaran (1988)
- Bheema (2024)
- Bheema Theeradalli (2012)
- Bheemaa (2008)
- Bheemadevarapally Branchi (2023)
- Bheeman (1982)
- Bheemante Vazhi (2021)
- Bheemasena Nalamaharaja (2020)
- Bheeshanaye Athuru Kathawak (2003)
- Bheemili Kabaddi Jattu (2010)
- Bheemla Nayak (2022)
- Bheeshma (2020)
- Bheeshma Parvam (2022)
- Bheeshmar (2003)
- Bheja Chokh (1988)
- Bheja Fry (2007)
- Bheja Fry 2 (2011)
- Bhemaa (1984)
- Bhera (2024)
- Bhet (2002)

==== Bhi–Bhu ====
- Bhid Ja (2015)
- Bhikari (2017)
- Bhikharan (1935)
- Bhimaa (2024)
- Bhimanjaneya Yuddham (1966)
- Bhindi Bazaar (2011)
- Bhishma (1936)
- Bhishma (1962)
- Bhishma (1996)
- Bhishma Pratigna (1921)
- Bhishmar (2026)
- Bho Bho (2016)
- Bhobhar (2012)
- Bhobishyoter Bhoot (2019)
- Bhoga Khirikee (2018)
- Bhola Bhala (1978)
- Bhola in Bollywood (2004)
- Bhola Moira (1977)
- Bhola Shankar (2023)
- Bholaa (2023)
- Bhole Shankar (2008)
- Bholi Lutaran (1940)
- Bhonga (2021)
- Bhonsle (2018)
- Bhoodana (1962)
- Bhoogolam Thiriyunnu (1974)
- Bhookailas (1940)
- Bhookailas (1958)
- Bhookailas (2007)
- Bhookailasa (1958)
- Bhookambam (1983)
- Bhookamp (1993)
- Bhookh (1947)
- Bhookh (1978)
- Bhool Bhulaiyaa (2007)
- Bhool Bhulaiyaa 2 (2022)
- Bhool Bhulaiyaa 3 (2024)
- Bhool Chuk Maaf (2025)
- Bhooloham (2015)
- Bhooloka Rambai (1958)
- Bhoot (2003)
- Bhoot Bungla (1965)
- Bhukha (1989)
- Bhumika (1977)

=== Bi ===
==== Bia–Bid ====
- Bianca (1913)
- Bibi Blocksberg (2002)
- The Bibi Files (2024)
- Bibi Fricotin (1951)
- Bibi's Dog Is Dead (2024)
- The Bible: In The Beginning (1966)
- Bicentennial Man (1999)
- Les Biches (1968)
- Bichhoo (2000)
- Bichunmoo (2000)
- Bicycle (2014)
- The Bicycle (2006)
- Bicycle Boy (2015)
- Bicycle Bride (2010)
- Bicycle Days (2023)
- Bicycle Dreams (2009)
- Bicycle Hora (1968)
- The Bicycle Racer (1983)
- Bicycle Thieves: (1948 & 2013)
- Bicycles Are for the Summer (1984)
- Les Bicyclettes de Belsize (1968)
- A Bid for Fortune (1917)
- Bidadari Mencari Sayap (2020)
- Bidasari (1965)
- Biddy (1983)
- Bidesiya (1963)
- Il bidone (1962)
- Bidrohi (2022)
- Bidugade (1973)
- Bidugadeya Bedi (1985)

==== Big ====
- Big (1988)
- The Big Bad Fox and Other Tales... (2017)
- Big Bad Mama (1974)
- Big Bad Wolf (2006)
- The Big Bad Wolf: (1934 & 2013)
- Big Bad Wolves (2013)
- The Big Bee (2015)
- The Big Blue (1988)
- A Big Bold Beautiful Journey (2025)
- The Big Bounce: (1960, 1969 & 2004)
- Big Boys (2023)
- The Big Brawl (1980)
- The Big Broadcast (1932)
- Big Bug Man (2008)
- Big Bullet (1996)
- Big Bully (1996)
- The Big Bus (1976)
- Big Business: (1929 & 1988)
- The Big Chill (1983)
- Big City Blues: (1932 & 1997)
- The Big Clock (1948)
- The Big Combo (1955)
- The Big Country (1958)
- Big Daddy: (1969 & 1999)
- Big Deal After 20 Years (1985)
- Big Deal on Madonna Street (1958)
- The Big Easy (1986)
- Big Eden (2000)
- The Big Empty: (2003 & 2005)
- Big Eyes (2014)
- Big Fan (2009)
- Big Fat Liar (2002)
- The Big Feast (1973)
- Big Fish (2003)
- Big Fish & Begonia (2016)
- The Big Fix: (1947, 1978 & 2012)
- Big Girls Don't Cry (2002)
- The Big Green (1995)
- The Big Gundown (1966)
- A Big Hand for the Little Lady (1966)
- The Big Heat (1953)
- Big Hero 6 (2014)
- The Big Hit (1998)
- The Big House: (1930 & 2001)
- Big House, U.S.A. (1955)
- Big Jake (1971)
- Big Jim McLain (1952)
- The Big Kahuna (1999)
- The Big Knife (1955)
- Big Leaguer (1953)
- The Big Lebowski (1998)
- Big Legend (2018)
- Big Miracle (2012)
- Big Momma series:
  - Big Momma's House (2000)
  - Big Momma's House 2 (2006)
  - Big Mommas: Like Father, Like Son (2011)
- Big Money Hustlas (2000)
- The Big Mouth (1967)
- Big Night (1996)
- Big Nothing (2006)
- The Big One (1998)
- The Big Parade: (1925 & 1986)
- The Big Picture: (1989 & 2010)
- Big Red (1962)
- Big Red Envelope (2021)
- The Big Red One (1980)
- The Big Risk (1960)
- The Big Road (1934)
- Big Shark (2023)
- The Big Shave (1967)
- The Big Short (2015)
- The Big Shot: (1922, 1931, 1937 & 1942)
- Big Shot's Funeral (2001)
- Big Shots (1987)
- The Big Show: (1923, 1926, 1936, 1960 & 1961)
- The Big Sick (2017)
- The Big Sky (1952)
- The Big Sleep: (1946 & 1978)
- The Big Splash (1935)
- Big Stan (2008)
- The Big Steal (1949)
- The Big Store (1941)
- The Big Swindle (2004)
- Big Time Adolescence (2019)
- Big Time Movie (2012)
- Big Top Bunny (1951)
- Big Top Pee-wee (1988)
- The Big Trail (1930)
- Big Trouble: (1986 & 2002)
- Big Trouble in Little China (1986)
- The Big Wedding (2013)
- Big Wednesday (1978)
- The Big Wheel (1949)
- The Big White (2005)
- The Big Year (2011)
- The Bigamist: (1921, 1953 & 1956)
- Bigbug (2022)
- Bigfoot: (1970, 2009 & 2012 TV)
- Bigfoot Junior (2017)
- A Bigger Splash: (1973 & 2015)
- Bigger Than Life (1956)
- Bigger Than the Sky (2005)
- Bigger Than Us (2021)
- The Biggest Little Farm (2018)
- Biggles: Adventures in Time (1986)
- BigLove (2001)

==== Bii–Bim ====
- Biidaaban (The Dawn Comes) (2018)
- Biidaaban: First Light (2018)
- Bijoyar Pore (2024)
- Biju Babu (2019)
- Bijuli Machine (2016)
- Biker Boyz (2003)
- The Bikeriders (2023)
- Bikers Kental 2 (2019)
- Bikini Airways (2003)
- Bikini Bandits (2002)
- Bikini Beach (1964)
- Bikini Bloodbath (2006)
- Bikini Chain Gang (2004)
- Bikini Frankenstein (2010)
- Bikini a Go-Go (2004)
- Bikini Paradise (1967)
- Bikkar Bai Sentimental (2013)
- Bikram Singha: The Lion Is Back (2012)
- Biktima: (1990 & 2012)
- Bilal: A New Breed of Hero (2015)
- Bilang Na ang Araw Mo (1996)
- Bilangin ang Bituin sa Langit (1989)
- Bilitis (1977)
- Bill: (1981 TV, 2007 & 2015)
- Bill & Ted series:
  - Bill & Ted's Excellent Adventure (1989)
  - Bill & Ted's Bogus Journey (1991)
  - Bill & Ted Face the Music (2020)
- Bill Cosby: Himself (1983)
- A Bill of Divorcement: (1922, 1932 & 1940)
- Bill, the Science Hero (2014)
- Bil Henry (1919)
- Bill Nye: Science Guy (2017)
- Bill: On His Own (1983) (TV)
- Bill W. (2012)
- Billa: (1980, 2007 & 2009)
- Billa II (2012)
- Billboard Dad (1998) (TV)
- Billion Dollar Brain (1967)
- Billionaire Boys Club: (1987 TV & 2018)
- Billionaire Ransom (2016)
- Billu (2009)
- Billy Bathgate (1991)
- Billy Budd (1962)
- Billy Elliot (2000)
- Billy Jack (1971)
- Billy Jack Goes to Washington (1977)
- Billy the Kid: (1911, 1930, 1941, 1964 & 1989 TV)
- Billy the Kid Returns (1938)
- Billy the Kid Versus Dracula (1966)
- Billy Liar (1963)
- Billy Lynn's Long Halftime Walk (2016)
- Billy Madison (1995)
- Billy's Dad Is a Fudge-Packer (2004)
- Billy's Hollywood Screen Kiss (1998)
- Biloxi Blues (1988)
- Bimmer (2003)

==== Bin–Biz ====
- Bin Badal Barsaat (1975)
- Bin Bulaye Baraati (2011)
- Bin Kamacha Navra (1984)
- Bin Phere Hum Tere (1979)
- Bin Roye (2015)
- Bindaas: (2008, 2010 & 2014)
- Bindhaast (1999)
- Bindiya Chamkegi (1983)
- Bindu (2009)
- Binge & Purge (2002)
- Bingo: (1974, 1991, 1998 & 2012)
- Bingo: The King of the Mornings (2017)
- Bingo Bongo (1982)
- The Bingo Long Traveling All-Stars & Motor Kings (1976)
- Bintou (2001)
- Bio Zombie (1998)
- Bio-Dome (1996)
- Bionicle: Mask of Light (2003)
- Biography of a Bachelor Girl (1935)
- Biohazard (1985)
- Biohazard 4D-Executer (2000)
- Biohazard: The Alien Force (1994)
- Bir (2020)
- Bird: (1988 & 2017)
- Bird Box (2018)
- The Bird with the Crystal Plumage (1970)
- Bird People (2014)
- Bird on a Wire (1990)
- The Birdcage (1996)
- Birdcage Inn (1998)
- Birdeater (2023)
- Birdemic: Shock and Terror (2010)
- Birdemic 2: The Resurrection (2013)
- Birdman (2014)
- Birdman of Alcatraz (1962)
- The Birds (1963)
- The Birds II: Land's End (1994) (TV)
- Birds Anonymous (1957)
- Birds Do It (1966)
- Birds of Passage (2018)
- Birds of Prey: (1927, 1930, 1973 TV & 2020)
- Birds, Orphans and Fools (1969)
- Birdy (1984)
- Biri Gal (2015)
- Birth: (1984 & 2004)
- Birth/Rebirth (2023)
- The Birth of a Nation: (1915 & 2016)
- Birthday Girl (2001)
- The Birthday Trip (2026)
- The Birthday Party: (1931 & 1968)
- The Biscuit Eater: (1940 & 1972)
- Bis (2015)
- Bis fünf nach zwölf – Adolf Hitler und das 3. Reich (1953)
- Bishonen (1998)
- The Bishop's Wife (1947)
- Bismarck (1940)
- Bismillah (2022)
- Bison (2014)
- Bit (2019)
- Bitayin si... Baby Ama? (1976)
- Bitch Ass (2022)
- Bitch Hug (2012)
- Bitch Slap (2009)
- Bite (2015)
- Bite the Bullet (1975)
- A Bite of China: Celebrating the Chinese New Year (2016)
- Bite of a Mango (2022)
- Bite Me (2019)
- Bite Me! (2004)
- Bits of Life (1921)
- Bits and Pieces (1996)
- Bits of What I Have (2015)
- Bitten (2008)
- Bitter Apples (1927)
- Bitter End of a Sweet Night (1961)
- Bitter Feast (2010)
- Bitter Flowers: (2007 & 2017)
- Bitter Harvest: (1963, 1981 TV, 1993 & 2017)
- Bitter Honey (2014)
- Bitter Jester (2003)
- Bitter Love (2014)
- Bitter Melon (2018)
- Bitter Moon (1992)
- Bitter Rice (1949)
- Bitter Seeds (2011)
- Bitter Springs (1950)
- Bitter Sweet: (1933 & 1940)
- The Bitter Tea of General Yen (1933)
- The Bitter Tears of Petra von Kant (1972)
- Bitter & Twisted (2008)
- Bitter Victory (1957)
- Bittersweet (2020)
- A Bittersweet Life (2005)
- Bittersweet Love (1976)
- Bittersweet Memories (2004)
- Bittersweet Symphony (2019)
- Bituing Marikit (1937)
- Bituing Walang Ningning (1985)
- Biutiful (2010)
- Le Bivouac (1896)
- Biwi Aur Makan (1966)
- Biwi Ho To Aisi (1988)
- Biwi No.1 (1999)
- Biwi-O-Biwi (1981)
- Bix (1991)
- Biye Bibhrat (2023)
- Bizarre, Bizarre (1937)

=== BK ===
- BKS (2019)

=== Bl ===
==== Bla ====
- Bla Bla Baby (2022)
- Black: (2004, 2005 & 2008)
- Black & White: (1998, 1999 & 2002)
- Black & White Episode I: The Dawn of Assault (2012)
- Black & White: The Dawn of Justice (2014)
- Black '47 (2018)
- Black Adam (2022)
- Black Angel: (1946, 1978 & 1980)
- Black Bag (2025)
- Black Bear (2020)
- Black Beauty: (1921, 1933, 1946, 1971, 1978 TV, 1987, 1994 & 2020)
- Black Belly of the Tarantula (1971)
- Black Belt Jones (1974)
- Black and Blue: (1999 & 2019)
- Black Book (2006)
- Black Box: (1978, 2002, 2013, 2020 & 2026)
- The Black Box: (1915 & 2005)
- Black Bread (2010)
- Black Caesar (1973)
- Black Candles (1982)
- The Black Cannon Incident (1985)
- The Black Cat: (1934, 1941 & 1981)
- Black Cat Mansion (1958)
- Black Cat, White Cat (1998)
- The Black Cauldron (1985)
- Black Chicks Talking (2001)
- Black Christmas: (1974, 2006 & 2019)
- Black City (1961)
- Black Cloud (2004)
- Black Coal, Thin Ice (2014)
- Black Coffee: (1931 & 2021)
- The Black Corsair: (1937 & 1976)
- Black Crab (2022)
- The Black Dahlia (2006)
- Black Dalia (2009)
- Black Dawn (2005)
- Black Death (2010)
- Black Dog (1998)
- Black Dynamite (2009)
- Black Eagle (1988)
- Black Emanuelle (1975)
- Black-Eyed Susan (1913)
- The Black Forest Girl: (1929, 1933 & 1950)
- The Black Fox (1962)
- Black Fox: The Rise and Fall of Adolf Hitler (1962)
- Black Friday: (1916, 1940, 2004 & 2021)
- Black Girl: (1966 & 1972)
- Black God, White Devil (1964)
- Black Gravel (1961)
- Black Hawk Down (2001)
- Black Hole (2015)
- The Black Hole: (1979, 2006 TV & 2016)
- Black Holes (1995)
- Black House (2007)
- Black Is King (2020)
- Black Jack: (1927, 1950 & 1979)
- Black Knight (2001)
- Black Legion (1937)
- Black Lightning: (1924 & 2009)
- Black Like Me (1964)
- Black Magic: (1929, 1944, 1949, 1975 & 1987)
- Black Mail (1973)
- Black Mama, White Mama (1973)
- The Black Marble (1980)
- The Black Market (1953)
- Black Mask (1996)
- Black Mask 2: City of Masks (2002)
- Black Mass (2015)
- Black Mirror: Bandersnatch (2018)
- Black Moon: (1934 & 1975)
- Black Moon Rising (1986)
- The Black Moses (2013)
- Black Narcissus (1947)
- Black October (2000) (TV)
- Black Orpheus (1959)
- Black Panther (2018)
- Black Panther: Wakanda Forever (2022)
- Black Peter (1964)
- The Black Phone (2021)
- Black Phone 2 (2025)
- The Black Pierrot: (1913 & 1926)
- The Black Pirate (1926)
- The Black Pirates (1954)
- Black Rain: (1989 American & 1989 Japanese)
- Black Rat (2010)
- Black Republic (1990)
- Black Robe (1991)
- Black Rock (2012)
- Black Rose (2014)
- Black Roses: (1921, 1932, 1935, 1945 & 1988)
- Black Sabbath (1963)
- The Black Scorpion (1957)
- Black Sheep: (1996, 2006 New Zealand & 2006 German)
- The Black Shield of Falworth (1954)
- Black Snake Moan (2007)
- The Black Stallion (1979)
- Black Stallion (2010)
- Black Sunday: (1960 & 1977)
- The Black Swan (1942)
- Black Swan (2010)
- Black Swans (2005)
- Black Tuesday (1954)
- The Black Vampire (1953)
- Black Water: (2007 & 2018)
- Black Water: Abyss (2020)
- Black & White: (2008 Hindi & 2008 Telugu)
- Black and White in Color (1976)
- Black & White: The Dawn of Justice (2014)
- Black & White & Sex (2011)
- Black Widow: (1954, 1987, 2005, 2007 TV, 2010 & 2021)
- The Black Widow (1951)
- Black Widow Business (2016)
- The Black Windmill (1974)
- Blackball (2005)
- Blackballed (2004)
- Blackbeard the Pirate (1952)
- Blackbeard's Ghost (1968)
- BlackBerry (2023)
- Blackbird: (2007, 2012, 2013, 2014, 2018 & 2019)
- Blackbirds: (1915 & 1920)
- Blackbirds at Bangpleng (1994)
- Blackboard Jungle (1955)
- Blackenstein (1973)
- Blackfish (2013)
- Blackhat (2015)
- BlacKkKlansman (2018)
- Blacklight (2022)
- Blackmail: (1929, 1939, 1947 & 2005)
- Blackmailed: (1920 & 1951)
- The Blacksmith (1922)
- Blacksmith Scene (1893)
- The Blackout: (1997, 2009 & 2019)
- Blackwater Lane (2024)
- Blacula (1972)
- Blade (1973)
- The Blade (1995)
- Blade series:
  - Blade (1998)
  - Blade II (2002)
  - Blade: Trinity (2004)
- A Blade in the Dark (1983)
- Blade of Fury (1993)
- The Blade Master (1984)
- Blade of the Ripper (1971)
- Blade Runner series:
  - Blade Runner (1982)
  - Blade Runner 2049 (2017)
  - 2036: Nexus Dawn (2017)
  - 2048: Nowhere to Run (2017)
  - Blade Runner Black Out 2022 (2017)
- Blades (1989)
- Blades of Glory (2007)
- Blades of the Guardians (2026)
- Blair Witch (2016)
- The Blair Witch Project (1999)
- Blame It on the Bellboy (1992)
- Blame It on Rio (1984)
- Blancanieves (2012)
- The Blancheville Monster (1963)
- Les Blanchisseuses (1896)
- Blank Check (1994)
- The Blank Generation (1976)
- Blankman (1994)
- Blast From the Past (1999)
- Blast of Silence (1961)
- Blaze: (1989 & 2018)
- Blaze Starr Goes Nudist (1962)
- Blazing Saddles (1974)

==== Ble ====
- Bleach (1998)
- Bleach series:
  - Bleach: Memories of Nobody (2006)
  - Bleach: The DiamondDust Rebellion (2007)
  - Bleach: Fade to Black (2008)
  - Bleach: Hell Verse (2010)
  - Bleach (2018)
- Bleak House (1920)
- Bleak Moments (1971)
- Bleak Night (2010)
- Bleak Street (2015)
- Bleat! (2025)
- The Blech Effect (2020)
- Bled (2009)
- Le Bled (1929)
- Bleed with Me (2020)
- Bleed Out (2018)
- Bleed. Scream. Beat! (2017)
- Bleed for This (2016)
- Bleeder (1999)
- Bleeders (1997)
- The Bleeding (2009)
- The Bleeding Edge (2018)
- Bleeding Heart (2015)
- The Bleeding House (2011)
- Bleeding Love (2023)
- Bleeding Steel (2017)
- Bleeke Bet (1923)
- Bleeke Bet (1934)
- Blended (2014)
- Blending Christmas (2021) (TV)
- Bless the Beasts and Children (1971)
- Bless the Child (2000)
- Bless the Child (2003)
- Bless 'Em All (1948)
- Bless Me, Ultima (2013)
- Bless Their Little Hearts (1984)
- Bless This House (1972)
- Bless the Woman (2003)
- Bless You, Prison (2002)
- Blessed (2004)
- Blessed (2008)
- Blessed (2009)
- The Blessed (2017)
- Blessed Benefit (2016)
- Blessed Boys (2021)
- Blessed Event (1932)
- Blessed by Fire (2005)
- Blessed Madness (2018)
- The Blessed Ones (1986) (TV)
- Blessings (2003) (TV)
- Blessings of the Land (1959)
- Bleu comme un coup de feu (2003)

==== Bli ====
- Blightly (1927)
- Blind (2007)
- Blind (2011)
- Blind (2014)
- Blind (2016)
- Blind (2019)
- Blind (2023)
- Blind Adventure (1933)
- Blind Alibi (1938)
- Blind Alley (1939)
- Blind Alleys (1927)
- Blind Ambition (2021) (TV)
- Blind Ambition (2022)
- Blind Beast (1969)
- Blind Beast vs. Dwarf (2001)
- Blind Boxer (1972)
- Blind Chance (1987)
- Blind Company (2009)
- Blind Corner (1964)
- Blind Date (1934)
- Blind Date (1959)
- Blind Date (1984)
- Blind Date (1987)
- Blind Date (1996)
- Blind Date (2007)
- Blind Date (2015)
- Blind Dates (2013)
- Blind Dating (2006)
- Blind Desire (1945)
- Blind Detective (2013)
- Blind Faith (1998) (TV)
- Blind Flight (2003)
- Blind Folly (1939)
- Blind Fury (1989)
- Blind Guys (2001)
- Blind Hearts (1921)
- Blind Horizon (2003)
- Blind Husbands (1919)
- Blind Intersections (2012)
- Blind Justice (1916)
- Blind Justice (1934)
- Blind Justice (1961)
- Blind Justice (1986) (TV)
- Blind Justice (1988)
- Blind Justice (1994) (TV)
- Blind Love (1912)
- Blind Love (2015)
- Blind Love (2016)
- Blind Loves (2008)
- Blind Man (2012)
- Blind Massage (2014)
- Blind Mountain (2007)
- Blind Shaft (2003)
- The Blind Side (2009)
- Blind Spot: (1932, 1947, 1958, 2009, 2012, 2015, 2017 & 2018)
- Blindness: (2008 & 2016)
- The Bling Ring (2013)
- Blink (1994)
- Blink Twice (2024)
- Bliss: (1917, 1985, 1997 & 2007)
- The Bliss of Mrs. Blossom (1968)
- Blissfully Yours (2002)
- Blithe Spirit: (1945 & 2020)
- Blitz: (2011 & 2024)

==== Blo–Blu ====
- Bloat (2025)
- The Blob: (1958 & 1988)
- Block-Heads (1938)
- Blockers (2018)
- Blonde: (1950, 2001 & 2022)
- Blonde Ambition (2007)
- Blonde Venus (1932)
- Blood: (2000, 2004, 2009, 2012 & 2023)
- Blood & Chocolate (2007)
- Blood & Orchids (1986) (TV)
- Blood Alley (1955)
- Blood Bath (1966)
- The Blood Beast Terror (1968)
- Blood of the Beasts (1949)
- Blood and Black Lace (1964)
- Blood and Bone (2009)
- Blood Brothers: (1935, 1975, 1996, 2004, 2007 Chinese, 2007 Indian & 2018)
- The Blood Brothers (1973)
- Blood Debts (1985)
- Blood Diamond (2006)
- Blood Diner (1987)
- Blood for Dracula (1974)
- Blood of Dr. Jekyll (1981)
- Blood of Dracula's Castle (1969)
- Blood Father (2016)
- Blood Feast: (1963 & 1972)
- Blood Feast 2: All U Can Eat (2002)
- The Blood of Fu Manchu (1968)
- Blood Hook (1986)
- Blood Hunters (2016)
- Blood Hunters: Rise of the Hybrids (2019)
- Blood In Blood Out (1993)
- The Blood of Jesus (1941)
- Blood on the Moon (1948)
- Blood from the Mummy's Tomb (1972)
- Blood Oath (1990)
- The Blood of a Poet (1930)
- Blood Rain (2005)
- Blood and Sand (1922)
- The Blood on Satan's Claw (1971)
- Blood Shack (1971)
- Blood Simple (1984)
- The Blood Spattered Bride (1972)
- The Blood Stained Route Map (2002)
- Blood Star (2025)
- Blood Sucking Freaks (1976)
- Blood at Sundown (1966)
- Blood Surf (2001)
- Blood Thirst (1971)
- Blood Trails (2006)
- Blood of the Vampire (1958)
- Blood Vessel (2019)
- Blood and Wine (1997)
- Blood on Wolf Mountain (1936)
- Blood Work (2002)
- Blood: The Last Vampire: (2000 & 2009)
- Bloodbath at the House of Death (1983)
- Bloodbeat (1982)
- Bloodbrothers: (1978 & 2005)
- The Bloodhound (2020)
- Bloodhounds of Broadway: (1952 & 1989)
- Bloodhounds of the North (1913)
- Bloodlust! (1961)
- BloodRayne series:
  - BloodRayne (2006)
  - BloodRayne 2: Deliverance (2008)
  - BloodRayne: The Third Reich (2011)
- Bloodshot (2020)
- Bloodsport series:
  - Bloodsport (1988)
  - Bloodsport II: The Next Kumite (1996)
  - Bloodsport III (1997)
  - Bloodsport 4: The Dark Kumite (1999)
- The Bloodstained Butterfly (1971)
- The Bloodstained Shadow (1978)
- Bloodsucking Bastards (2015)
- Bloodthirsty (2020)
- Bloodthirsty Butchers (1970)
- A Bloody Aria (2006)
- Bloody Birthday (1981)
- Bloody Doll (2014)
- The Bloody Judge (1970)
- Bloody Mama (1970)
- Bloody Murder (2000)
- Bloody New Year (1987)
- Bloody Nose, Empty Pockets (2020)
- Bloody Spear at Mount Fuji (1955)
- Bloody Sunday (2002)
- Bloody Tie (2006)
- Bloom in the Moonlight (1993)
- Blossoms in the Dust (1941)
- The Blot (1921)
- The Blot on the Shield (1915)
- Blow (2001)
- Blow Dry (2001)
- Blow Out (1981)
- Blow the Man Down (2020)
- Blowing Wild (1953)
- Blown Away: (1992 & 1994)
- Blowup (1966)
- Blue Bayou (2021)
- Blue Beard (1901)
- Blue Beetle (2023)
- The Blue Bird: (1918, 1940 & 1976)
- Blue Car (2003)
- Blue Chips (1994)
- Blue Collar (1978)
- Blue Collar Comedy Tour: The Movie (2003)
- Blue Crush (2002)
- The Blue Dahlia (1946)
- Blue Desert (1991)
- The Blue Eagle (1930)
- Blue in the Face (1995)
- Blue Film (2026)
- The Blue Gardenia (1953)
- Blue Hawaii (1961)
- Blue Hour: The Disappearance of Nick Brandreth (2023)
- Blue Ice (1993)
- The Blue Iguana (1988)
- Blue Jasmine (2013)
- Blue Jay (2016)
- The Blue Kite (1993)
- The Blue Knight (1973) (TV)
- The Blue Lagoon: (1923, 1949 & 1980)
- The Blue Lamp (1950)
- The Blue Light (1932)
- Blue Lips (2018)
- The Blue Max (1966)
- Blue Money: (1972 & 1985 TV)
- Blue Monkey (1987)
- Blue Mountain State: The Rise of Thadland (2016)
- Blue Movie: (1969 & 1971)
- Blue Murder at St Trinian's (1957)
- The Blue Room: (2002 & 2014)
- Blue Ruin (2013)
- Blue Skies: (1929 & 1946)
- Blue Sky: (1955 & 1994)
- Blue Sky Bones (2014)
- Blue Spring (2002)
- Blue Spring Ride (2014)
- Blue Streak (1999)
- Blue Thunder (1983)
- The Blue Umbrella: (2005 & 2013)
- Blue Valentine (2010)
- The Blue Veil: (1942 & 1951)
- Blue Velvet (1986)
- Blue Velvet Revisited (2016)
- Blue Is the Warmest Colour (2013)
- Bluebeard: (1944, 1951, 1972 & 2009)
- The Blueberry Hunt (2016)
- Blueprint (2003)
- The Blues Brothers (1980)
- Blues Brothers 2000 (1998)
- Blume in Love (1973)
- Blund's Lullaby (2017)

=== Bm–Bn ===
- BMX Bandits (1983)
- BNK48: Girls Don't Cry (2018)

=== Bo ===
- Bo (2010)
- Bo Burnham: Inside (2021)
- Bo Ma (2014)
- Bo Nay Toe (2019)

==== Boa–Bom ====
- Boa... Nguu yak! (2006)
- Boa vs. Python (2004)
- Boadicea (1927)
- Boar (2017)
- Board and Care (1979)
- Boardinghouse (1983)
- Boardwalk (1979)
- Boarding Gate (2007)
- Boarding House Blues (1948)
- Boarding House Groonen (1925)
- Boarding School (2018)
- Boat: (2009 & 2024)
- The Boat (1921)
- Boat Builders (1938)
- Boat People: (1982 & 2023)
- Boat Trip (2002)
- The Boatniks (1970)
- Bob & Carol & Ted & Alice (1969)
- Bob the High Roller (1955)
- Bob Marley: One Love (2024)
- Bob Roberts (1992)
- Bob Ross: Happy Accidents, Betrayal & Greed (2021)
- Bob Thunder: Internet Assassin (2015)
- Bob Trevino Likes It (2024)
- Bob's Birthday (1993)
- The Bob's Burgers Movie (2022)
- Bob's Your Uncle (1942)
- Bobby: (1973, 2002 & 2006)
- Bobby Deerfield (1977)
- Bobby Fischer Against the World (2011)
- Bobby Jones: Stroke of Genius (2004)
- Bobby, the Petrol Boy (1929)
- Bobby's Kodak (1908)
- Bobby's War (1974)
- BoBoiBoy: The Movie (2016)
- BoBoiBoy Movie 2 (2019)
- Bodies Bodies Bodies (2022)
- Bodies, Rest & Motion (1993)
- Body: (2015 American & 2015 Polish)
- The Body: (1970, 1974, 2001, 2012 & 2018)
- Body Double (1984)
- Body of Evidence: (1988 TV & 1993)
- Body God (2022)
- Body Guard (2010)
- Body Heat (1981)
- Body Jumper (2001)
- Body of Lies (2008)
- Body of My Enemy (1976)
- Body Parts (1991)
- Body Shots (2000)
- The Body Snatcher (1946)
- Body Snatchers (1993)
- Body and Soul: (1925, 1927, 1931, 1947, 1981 & 1999)
- Body Without Soul (1994)
- Bodyguard (2011)
- The Bodyguard: (1992 & 2004)
- The Bodyguard 2 (2007)
- Bodyguard Kiba: (1973 & 1993)
- Bodyguard Kiba: Apocalypse of Carnage (1994)
- Bodyguard Kiba: Apocalypse of Carnage 2 (1995)
- Boeing Boeing: (1965 & 1985)
- The Bogeyman (1953)
- Boggy Creek (2011)
- Boggy Creek II: And the Legend Continues (1985)
- The Bogie Man (1992 TV)
- Bogus (1996)
- The Bohemian Girl: (1922 & 1936)
- Bohemian Rhapsody (2018)
- La Bohème: (1926 & 1965)
- Boiler Room (2000)
- Boiling Point: (1990, 1993 & 2021)
- Bois de Boulogne (1896)
- Bol (2011)
- Bolero: (1934, 1942 & 1984)
- Bollywood/Hollywood (2002)
- Bolshevism on Trial (1919)
- Bolt: (1994 & 2008)
- A Bolt from the Blue (2014)
- Bolívar Soy Yo (2002)
- Bolivia (2002)
- Bombay Talkies (2013)
- Bombshell: (1933, 1997 & 2019)

==== Bon–Boz ====
- Un bon bock (1892)
- Bon Cop, Bad Cop (2006)
- Bon Cop, Bad Cop 2 (2017)
- Bon Voyage: (1944, 1954, 2003 & 2006)
- Bon Voyage, Charlie Brown (and Don't Come Back!!) (1980)
- Bon Voyage! (1962)
- Bonded by Blood (2010)
- Bone (1972)
- The Bone Collector (1997)
- Bone Lake (2025)
- Bone Tomahawk (2015)
- Bones: (2001 & 2010)
- Bones and All (2022)
- The Bonfire of the Vanities (1990)
- Bongoland (2003)
- Bongwater (1997)
- Le Bonheur: (1934 & 1965)
- Bonjour Monsieur Shlomi (2003)
- Bonjour tristesse (1958)
- Bonneville (2006)
- Bonnie and Clyde (1967)
- Bonzo Goes to College (1952)
- Boo (2005)
- Boo! A Madea Halloween (2016)
- Boo 2! A Madea Halloween (2017)
- The Boogens (1981)
- Boogeyman (2005)
- The Boogeyman: (1980 & 2023)
- Boogeyman 2 (2007)
- Boogeyman 3 (2008)
- Boogeyman II (1983)
- Boogie: (2008, 2009 & 2021)
- Boogie Man: The Lee Atwater Story (2008)
- The Boogie Man Will Get You (1942)
- Boogie Nights (1997)
- The Book of Clarence (2024)
- Book Club (2018)
- The Book of Daniel (2013)
- The Book of the Dead (2005)
- The Book of Eli (2010)
- The Book of Esther (2013)
- The Book of Fish (2021)
- The Book of Gabrielle (2016)
- The Book of Henry (2017)
- The Book of Life: (1998, 2014 & 2016)
- Book of Love: (1990, 2002, 2004 & 2016)
- The Book of Masters (2009)
- The Book of Mormon Movie (2003)
- The Book of Pooh: Stories from the Heart (2001)
- The Book of Revelation (2006)
- The Book of Ruth: Journey of Faith (2009)
- Book of Shadows: Blair Witch 2 (2000)
- The Book of Stars (1999)
- The Book Thief (2013)
- The Book of Vision (2020)
- Booksmart (2019)
- Boom Town (1940)
- Boomerang: (1934, 1947, 1976, 1992, 2001, 2015 & 2019)
- The Boomerang: (1919 & 1925)
- The Boondock Saints (1999)
- The Boondock Saints II: All Saints Day (2009)
- Boonie Bears series:
  - Boonie Bears: To the Rescue (2014)
  - Boonie Bears: Mystical Winter (2015)
  - Boonie Bears: The Big Top Secret (2016)
  - Boonie Bears: Entangled Worlds (2017)
  - Boonie Bears: The Wild Life (2021)
  - Boonie Bears: Back to Earth (2022)
  - Boonie Bears: Guardian Code (2023)
  - Boonie Bears: Time Twist (2024)
  - Boonie Bears: Future Reborn (2025)
- Das Boot (1981)
- Boot Hill (1969)
- Booty Call (1997)
- BoOzy' OS and the Cristal Gem (2013)
- Bop Girl Goes Calypso (1957)
- Bopha! (1993)
- Borat: Cultural Learnings of America for Make Benefit Glorious Nation of Kazakhstan (2006)
- Borat Subsequent Moviefilm (2020)
- Bordello of Blood (1996)
- Border: (1997 & 2007)
- The Border: (1982, 1996, 2007 & 2009)
- Border Incident (1949)
- Border Radio (1987)
- Border River (1954)
- Border War: The Battle Over Illegal Immigration (2006)
- Borderland: (1922, 1937 & 2007)
- Borderlands (2024)
- The Borderlands (2013)
- Borderline: (1930, 1950, 1980, 2008 & 2025)
- Bordertown: (1935 & 2007)
- Borg vs McEnroe (2017)
- Borgman (2013)
- Boris and Natasha: The Movie (1992)
- Born to Be Blue (2015)
- Born into Brothels (2004)
- Born in China (2016)
- Born to Dance (1936)
- Born in East L.A. (1987)
- Born to Fight: (1936, 1984, 1989 & 2004)
- Born in Flames (1983)
- Born on the Fourth of July (1989)
- Born Free (1966)
- Born of Hope (2009)
- Born to Kill: (1947, 1967, 1974 & 1996)
- The Born Losers (1967)
- Born to Sing: (1942 & 2013)
- Born to Be Wild: (1995 & 2011)
- Born to Win (1971)
- Born Yesterday: (1950 & 1993)
- The Borrower (1991)
- The Borrowers: (1973 TV, 1997 & 2011 TV)
- Borsalino (1970)
- Borsalino & Co. (1974)
- Bos (2017)
- The Boss (2016)
- The Boss Baby (2017)
- The Boss Baby: Family Business (2021)
- Boss Level (2021)
- Boss Nigger (1975)
- The Boston Strangler (1968)
- The Boston Tea Party: (1908 & 1915)
- The Bostonians (1984)
- Botched (2008)
- Both Sides of the Blade (2022)
- The Bothersome Man (2007)
- A Bottle in the Gaza Sea (2011)
- Bottle Rocket (1996)
- Bottle Shock (2008)
- Bottom of the 9th (2019)
- Bottom of the World (2017)
- Bottoms (2023)
- Bottoms Up: (1934, 1960 & 2006)
- Bouchra (2024)
- Boudu Saved from Drowning (1932)
- Boulevard des Italiens (1896)
- Bounce (2000)
- Bound (1996 & 2015)
- Bound for Glory (1976)
- The Boundary (2014)
- The Bounty: (1984 & 2012)
- The Bounty Hunter: (1954 & 2010)
- Bounty Hunters: (1996 & 2016)
- Bounty Killer (2013)
- The Bourne Identity (1988 TV)
- Bourne series:
  - The Bourne Identity (2002)
  - The Bourne Supremacy (2004)
  - The Bourne Ultimatum (2007)
  - The Bourne Legacy (2012)
  - Jason Bourne (2016)
- The Bow (2005)
- The Bowery (1933)
- Bowery Blitzkrieg (1941)
- Bowfinger (1999)
- Bowling for Columbine (2002)
- The Box: (1967, 1976, 2003, 2007, 2009, 2021 Mexican & 2021 South Korean)
- Box of Moon Light (1997)
- Boxcar Bertha (1972)
- Das Boxende Känguruh (1895)
- Boxer: (1984, 2015 & 2018)
- The Boxer: (1958, 1997 & 2012)
- The Boxer's Bride (1926)
- The Boxer's Omen (1983)
- Boxing Helena (1993)
- The Boxing Kangaroo (1896)
- Boxing Match; or, Glove Contest (1896)
- The Boxtrolls (2014)
- Boy: (1969, 2009 & 2010)
- The Boy: (2015 & 2016)
- Boy A (2008)
- The Boy and the Beast (2015)
- The Boy Behind the Door (2020)
- The Boy in Blue: (1919 & 1986)
- A Boy Called Christmas (2021)
- A Boy Called Dad (2009)
- A Boy Called H (2013)
- A Boy Called Hate (1995)
- A Boy Called Po (2016)
- A Boy Called Sailboat (2018)
- Boy Called Twist (2004)
- Boy on a Dolphin (1957)
- Boy Erased (2018)
- The Boy Friend: (1926 & 1971)
- Boy Goes to Heaven (2005)
- A Boy and His Dog: (1946 short & 1976)
- Boy Kills World (2023)
- Boy Meets Dog (1938)
- Boy Meets Girl: (1938, 1982, 1984, 1998 & 2014)
- A Boy Named Charlie Brown (1969)
- A Boy Named Sue (2001)
- The Boy Next Door (2015)
- The Boy in the Iron Box (TBA)
- The Boy in the Plastic Bubble (1976)
- The Boy in the Striped Pajamas (2008)
- Boy Trouble (1939)
- The Boy Turns Man (1972)
- The Boy Who Could Fly (1986)
- The Boy Who Cried Werewolf: (1973 & 2010 TV)
- The Boy Who Harnessed the Wind (2019)
- The Boy Who Talked to Badgers (1975)
- The Boy with the X-Ray Eyes (1999)
- Boyfriends (1996)
- Boyhood: (1951 & 2014)
- Boys: (1977, 1983, 1990, 1996 & 2003)
- The Boys: (1962 British, 1962 Finnish, 1991 & 1998)
- The Boys in the Band: (1970 & 2020)
- The Boys from Brazil (1978)
- Boys of the City (1940)
- The Boys in Company C (1978)
- Boys from County Hell (2021)
- Boys Don't Cry: (1999 & 2000)
- The Boys from Fengkuei (1983)
- Boys and Girls: (1983 & 2000)
- The Boys Next Door: (1985 & 1996 TV)
- Boys on the Side (1995)
- Boys State (2020)
- Boys from the Streets (1949)
- Boys Town (1938)
- Boys in the Trees (2016)
- The Boys Who Cried Wolf (2015)
- Boys Will Be Boys: (1921 & 1935)
- The Boys: The Sherman Brothers' Story (2009)
- Boys' Night Out (1962)
- Boyz n the Hood (1991)
- Boyz in the Wood (2019)
- Bozo (2013)

=== Br ===
==== Bra ====
- Brad's Status (2017)
- The Brady Bunch Movie (1995)
- The Brady Bunch in the White House (2002) (TV)
- Brahms: The Boy II (2020)
- Kids in the Hall: Brain Candy (1996)
- Brain Damage (1988)
- Brain Donors (1992)
- Brain on Fire (2016)
- The Brain That Wouldn't Die (1962)
- Braindead (1992)
- Brainscan (1994)
- Brainstorm: (1965, 1983 & 2000)
- Brainwashed (1960)
- Brake (2012)
- Bram Stoker's Dracula: (1974 TV & 1992)
- Bran Nue Dae (2010)
- The Brand New Testament (2015)
- Brand Upon the Brain! (2006)
- Branded to Kill (1967)
- Brannigan (1975)
- Brass Commandments (1923)
- Brass Knuckles (1927)
- Brass Target (1978)
- The Brass Teapot (2012)
- Brassed Off (1996)
- Bratz: The Movie (2007)
- The Bravados (1958)
- Brave: (1994, 2012 & 2014)
- The Brave (1997)
- The Brave Archer (1977)
- The Brave Archer 2 (1978)
- The Brave Archer 3 (1981)
- The Brave Archer and His Mate (1982)
- The Brave Little Toaster (1987)
- The Brave Little Toaster Goes to Mars (1988)
- The Brave Little Toaster to the Rescue (1989)
- The Brave One: (1956 & 2007)
- Brave Rabbit series:
  - Brave Rabbit (2011)
  - Brave Rabbit 2: Crazy Circus (2015)
  - Brave Rabbit 3: The Crazy Time Machine (2019)
- Braveheart: (1925 & 1995)
- Bravetown (2015)
- Bravo My Life (2007)
- Bravo, My Life (2005)
- Brawl in Cell Block 99 (2017)
- Brazil: (1944 & 1985)

==== Bre ====
- Breach: (2007 & 2020)
- Breach of Conduct (1994 TV)
- Breach of Faith: A Family of Cops 2 (1997 TV)
- Breach in the Silence (2012)
- Breach of Trust (2017)
- Bread and Roses: (1967, 1994 & 2000)
- Bread and Tulips (2000)
- Bread, Love and Dreams (1953)
- The Breadwinner: (2017 & 2026)
- Break Out (2002)
- The Break-Up (2006)
- The Break-up Season (2014)
- Breakable You (2017)
- Breakdown: (1952, 1997 & 2016)
- Breakdown: In Your House (1998)
- Breaker Morant (1980)
- Breakfast of Champions (1999)
- The Breakfast Club (1985)
- Breakfast on Pluto (2005)
- Breakfast at Tiffany's (1961)
- Breakheart Pass (1975)
- Breakin' (1984)
- Breakin' 2: Electric Boogaloo (1984)
- Breakin' All the Rules (2004)
- Breaking (2022)
- Breaking Away (1979)
- Breaking and Entering (2006)
- Breaking In: (1989 & 2018)
- Breaking with Old Ideas (1975)
- Breaking Up: (1985 & 1997)
- Breaking the Waves (1996)
- Breaking Wind (2012)
- Breakthrough: (1950, 1979, 1986 & 2019)
- Breast Men (1997)
- Breathe: (2009, 2014, 2017 & 2024)
- Breathe In (2013)
- Breathing Room (2008)
- Breathless: (1960, 1983 & 2009)
- The Breed: (2001 & 2006)
- Breeders (1986)
- Breezy (1974)
- The Bremen Town Musicians (1969)
- Brewster McCloud (1971)
- Brewster's Millions: (1914, 1921, 1935, 1945 & 1985)

==== Bri ====
- Brian and Charles (2022)
- Brian's Song: (1971 TV & 2001 TV)
- Brice de Nice (2005)
- Brick (2006)
- Brick Mansions (2014)
- The Bricklayer (2023)
- The Bride: (1973, 1985, 2015 & 2017)
- The Bride! (2026)
- The Bride and the Beast (1958)
- Bride of Boogedy (1987)
- The Bride Came C.O.D. (1941)
- Bride of Chucky (1998)
- The Bride Comes Home (1935)
- Bride of Frankenstein (1935)
- Bride of the Gorilla (1951)
- Bride Hard (2025)
- Bride of the Monster (1956)
- Bride and Prejudice (2004)
- Bride of Re-Animator (1990)
- A Bride for Rip Van Winkle (2016)
- Bride of the Wind (2001)
- Bride Wars: (2009 & 2015)
- The Bride with White Hair (1993)
- The Bride with White Hair 2 (1993)
- The Bride Wore Black (1968)
- Brides: (2004 & 2014)
- The Brides of Dracula (1960)
- The Brides of Fu Manchu (1966)
- Brideshead Revisited (2008)
- Bridesmaids: (1989 & 2011)
- The Bridge: (1959, 1992 & 2006)
- Bridge: (1949 & 1988)
- The Bridge at Remagen (1969)
- The Bridge on the River Kwai (1957)
- The Bridge of San Luis Rey: (1929, 1944 & 2004)
- A Bridge to Terabithia: (1985 TV & 2007)
- A Bridge Too Far (1977)
- The Bridges of Madison County (1995)
- The Bridges at Toko-Ri (1954)
- Bridget Jones series:
  - Bridget Jones's Diary (2001)
  - Bridget Jones: The Edge of Reason (2004)
  - Bridget Jones's Baby (2016)
  - Bridget Jones: Mad About the Boy (2025)
- Brief Encounter (1945)
- A Brief History of Time (1992)
- Brief Interviews with Hideous Men (2009)
- Brief Season (1969)
- A Brief Vacation (1973)
- Brigada en acción (1977)
- Brigadoon: (1954 & 1966 TV)
- Brigands (1996)
- Brigham (1977)
- Brigham City (2001)
- Brigham Young (1940)
- Bright (2017)
- Bright Days Ahead (2013)
- Bright and Early (1918)
- Bright Eyes: (1929 & 1934)
- Bright Future (2003)
- Bright Leaf (1950)
- Bright Lights (1935)
- Bright Lights, Big City (1988)
- Bright Lights: Starring Carrie Fisher and Debbie Reynolds (2016)
- Bright Nights (2017)
- Bright Star (2009)
- Bright Victory (1951)
- Bright Young Things (2003)
- Brightburn (2019)
- Brighter Days Ahead (2025)
- Brightest Star (2013)
- Brighton 4th (2021)
- Brighton Beach Memoirs (1986)
- Brighton Rock: (1948 & 2010)
- Brihaspathi (2018)
- Brihonnola (2014)
- Brij Mohan Amar Rahe (2018)
- Brilliant (2004)
- Brilliant Future (1965)
- Brilliant Lies (1996)
- Brilliant Marriage (1936)
- Brilliant Waltz (1949)
- Brimstone: (1949 & 2016)
- Bring Her Back (2025)
- Bring Him to Me (2023)
- Bring It On series:
  - Bring It On (2000)
  - Bring It On Again (2004)
  - Bring It On: All or Nothing (2006)
  - Bring It On: In It to Win It (2007)
  - Bring It On: Fight to the Finish (2009)
  - Bring It On: Worldwide Cheersmack (2017)
  - Bring It On: Cheer or Die (2022)
- Bring Me the Head of Alfredo Garcia (1974)
- Bring Me Home (2019)
- Bring On the Night (1985)
- Bringing Down the House (2003)
- Bringing Out the Dead (1999)
- Bringing Up Baby (1938)
- The Brink: (2017 & 2019)
- Brink! (1998)
- The Brink's Job (1978)
- Briscola (1951)
- Bristol Boys (2006)
- Brita in the Merchant's House (1946)
- Britain at Bay (1940)
- Britain in a Day (2011)
- Britannic (2000 TV)
- British Intelligence (1940)
- Briton and Boer (1909)
- Britt-Marie Was Here (2019)
- Britz (2007 TV)

==== Bro ====
- Broadcast News (1987)
- Broadcast Signal Intrusion (2021)
- Broadway Bill (1934)
- Broadway Danny Rose (1984)
- Broadway Melody series:
  - The Broadway Melody (1929)
  - Broadway Melody of 1936 (1936)
  - Broadway Melody of 1938 (1937)
  - Broadway Melody of 1940 (1940)
- Broke Sky (2007)
- Brokeback Mountain (2005)
- Brokedown Palace (1999)
- The Broken (2008)
- Broken: (1993, 2005, 2006, 2012, 2013 & 2014)
- Broken Arrow: (1950 & 1996)
- Broken Blossoms (1919)
- Broken Bridges (2006)
- The Broken Circle Breakdown (2012)
- Broken City (2013)
- The Broken Cross: (1911 & 1916)
- Broken Embraces (2009)
- Broken English: (1981, 1996 & 2007)
- Broken Flowers (2005)
- The Broken Hearts Club: A Romantic Comedy (2000)
- Broken Lance (1954)
- Broken Lullaby (1932)
- Broken Trail (2006) (TV)
- Broker: (2010 & 2022)
- Bronco Billy (1980)
- Bronson (2008)
- The Brontë Sisters (1979)
- A Bronx Morning (1931)
- A Bronx Tale (1993)
- The Brood (1979)
- Brooklyn (2015)
- Brooklyn Rules (2009)
- Brooklyn's Finest (2009)
- Bros (2022)
- Brother: (1997 & 2000)
- The Brother from Another Planet (1984)
- Brother Bear (2003)
- Brother Bear 2 (2006)
- Brother to Brother (2004)
- Brother Future (1991)
- Brother Orchid (1940)
- Brother Rat (1938)
- Brother and Sister: (1976, 2010 & 2022)
- Brother Sun, Sister Moon (1972)
- The Brotherhood of the Bell (1970) (TV)
- Brotherhood of Blades (2014)
- Brotherhood of Blades II: The Infernal Battlefield (2017)
- Brotherhood of Blood (2007)
- The Brotherhood of Satan (1971)
- Brotherhood of the Wolf (2001)
- Brothers: (1913, 1929 (American), 1929 (German), 1930, 1977, 1982 TV, 2004, 2007, 2009, 2015, 2016, 2017 adventure, 2017 drama & 2024)
- The Brothers: (1947, 1973, 1979 & 2001)
- The Brothers Bloom (2009)
- The Brothers Grimm (2005)
- Brothers in Law (1957)
- The Brothers Lionheart (1977)
- The Brothers McMullen (1995)
- Brothers and Sisters: (1980 & 1992)
- Brothers and Sisters of the Toda Family (1941)
- The Brothers Solomon (2007)
- Brothers Till We Die (1977)
- Brothers Under Fire (2026)
- Brothers at War (2009)
- The Brown Bunny (2003)
- Brown Girl Begins (2017)
- Brown Sugar: (1922, 1931 & 2002)
- The Brown Wallet (1936)
- Brown's Requiem (1998)
- The Browning Version: (1951 & 1994)

==== Bru ====
- Brubaker (1980)
- Bruce Almighty (2003)
- Bruce Lee (2017)
- Bruce Lee: The Curse of the Dragon (1993)
- Bruce Lee, D-Day at Macao (1975)
- Bruce Lee: The Fighter (2015)
- Bruce Lee and I (1976)
- Bruce Lee, the Man and the Legend (1973)
- Bruce Lee: The Man, The Myth (1976)
- Bruce Lee, My Brother (2010)
- Bruce Lee: A Warrior's Journey (2000)
- Bruce Lee's Secret (1977)
- Bruce and Pepper Wayne Gacy's Home Movies (1989)
- Bruce and the Shaolin Bronzemen (1977)
- Bruce's Fist of Vengeance (1980)
- Die Brücke (1961)
- Bruised (2020)
- Bruiser (2000)
- Bruiser (2022)
- Brujas (1996)
- Brüno (2009)
- Brussels by Night (1983)
- The Brute: (1914, 1920, 1927 & 1961)
- Brute Force: (1914 & 1947)
- El Bruto (1953)
- Brutus: (1911 & 2016)

=== Bu ===
- The 'Burbs (1989)

==== Bub–Bum ====
- Bub (2001)
- Bubba Ho-tep (2002)
- Bubble (2005)
- Bubble (2022)
- The Bubble: (1966, 2001, 2006 & 2022)
- Bubble Boy (2001)
- Bubble Fiction: Boom or Bust (2007)
- Bubble Gum (2011)
- Bubble & Squeak (2025)
- Bubble Trouble (1953)
- Bubblegum (2023)
- Bubbles (1930)
- Bubbles Galore (1996)
- Bubbling Over (1934)
- Bubbling Troubles (1940)
- Bubi Is Jealous (1916)
- The Buccaneer: (1938 & 1958)
- Buccaneer Bunny (1948)
- Buccaneer's Girl (1950)
- The Buccaneers (1924)
- Buchanan's Wife (1918)
- Buchi Babu (1980)
- Buchinaidu Kandriga (2020)
- Buck (2011)
- Buck Alamo (2020)
- Buck Benny Rides Again (1940)
- Buck and the Preacher (1972)
- Buck Privates (1941)
- Buck Privates Come Home (1947)
- Buck Rogers in the 25th Cantury (1979)
- Buckaroo Bugs (1944)
- Buckaroo Sheriff of Texas (1951)
- Buckaroo: The Winchester Does Not Forgive (1967)
- A Bucket of Blood: (1959 & 1995)
- Bucket List (2018)
- The Bucket List (2007)
- Bucking the Barrier (1923)
- Bucking Broadway (1917)
- Bucking Broncho (1894)
- Bucking Fastard (2026)
- Bucking the Line (1921)
- Bucking the Tiger (1921)
- Bucking the Truth (1926)
- Buckley's Chance (2021)
- Buckshot John (1915)
- Buckskin (1968)
- Buckskin Frontier (1943)
- Bucktown (1975)
- Bucky Larson: Born to Be a Star (2011)
- Budapest (2018)
- Budbringeren (1998)
- A Buddha (2005)
- Buddha Mountain (2010)
- Buddy (2026)
- Buddy Buddy (1981)
- The Buddy Holly Story (1978)
- Buddymoon (2016)
- Buddies in India (2016)
- Budo: The Art of Killing (1978)
- Buena Vista Social Club (1999)
- Buffalo '66 (1998)
- Buffalo Bill and the Indians, or Sitting Bull's History Lesson (1976)
- The Buffalo Boy (2004)
- Buffalo Dreams (2005)
- Buffalo Gun (1961)
- Buffalo Soldier (1970)
- Buffalo Soldiers: (1997 TV & 2001)
- Buffet froid (1979)
- Buffy the Vampire Slayer (1992)
- Bug: (1975, 2002 & 2006)
- A Bug and a Bag of Weed (2006)
- A Bug's Life (1998)
- Bugged! (1997)
- Bugonia (2025)
- Bugs: (2003 & 2014)
- Bugsy (1991)
- Bugsy Malone (1976)
- The Buildout (2024)
- Bukowski (1973)
- Bulbul: (2013 & 2019)
- Bulbul Can Sing (2018)
- Bull: (1965, 2019 & 2021)
- Bull Durham (1988)
- Bulldog Drummond series:
  - Bulldog Drummond: (1922 & 1929)
  - Bulldog Jack (1935)
  - Bulldog Drummond's Revenge (1937)
  - Bulldog Drummond's Secret Police (1939)
  - Bulldog Drummond's Third Round (1925)
- Bullet Ballet (1998)
- A Bullet for the General (1966)
- A Bullet in the Gun Barrel (1958)
- Bullet in the Head (1990)
- A Bullet in the Head (1990)
- Bullet to the Head (2012)
- A Bullet in the Heart (1944)
- A Bullet for Joey (1955)
- A Bullet for Pretty Boy (1970)
- A Bullet for Sandoval (1969)
- A Bullet Through the Heart (1966)
- Bullet Train (2022)
- The Bullet Vanishes (2012)
- A Bullet Is Waiting (1954)
- Bulletproof: (1988 & 1996)
- Bulletproof Monk (2003)
- Bullets or Ballots (1936)
- Bullets of Justice (2019)
- Bullets Over Broadway (1994)
- Bullfighter and the Lady (1951)
- The Bullfighters (1945)
- Bullhead (2012)
- Bullitt (1968)
- Bullshot (1983)
- Bully: (2001 & 2011)
- Bulworth (1998)
- The Bum Bandit (1931)
- Bumblebee (2018)
- The Bumblebee Flies Anyway (1999)
- Bumm Bumm Bole (2010)
- A Bump Along the Way (2019)

==== Bun–Buz ====
- A Bunch of Amatuers (2008)
- A Bunch of Violets (1916)
- Bungee Jumping of Their Own (2001)
- The Bunker: (1981 TV, 2001 & 2024)
- Bunker (2022)
- Bunker Bean (1936)
- Bunker Heights (2026)
- Bunny and the Bull (2009)
- The Bunny Game (2010)
- Bunny the Killer Thing (2015)
- Bunny Lake Is Missing (1965)
- A Bunny's Tale (1985) (TV)
- Bunnylovr (2026)
- Bunnyman (2011)
- Bunnyman 2 (2014)
- Bunraku (2011)
- Bunshinsaba (2004)
- Buñuel in the Labyrinth of the Turtles (2018)
- Buppah Rahtree (2003)
- Buppah Rahtree Phase 2: Rahtree Returns (2005)
- Burden of Dreams (1982)
- Burglar (1987)
- A Burglar for a Night (1918)
- A Burglar's Mistake (1909)
- The Burial (2023)
- Burial Ground (1981)
- Buried (2010)
- Buried on Sunday (1992)
- Buriki no kunsho (1981)
- Burke & Hare: (1972 & 2010)
- Burlesque: (2010 American & 2010 Australian)
- A Burlesque on Carmen (1915)
- The Burmese Harp: (1956 & 1985)
- Burn After Reading (2008)
- Burn! (1970)
- Burn Out (2018)
- The Burned Barns (1973)
- Burning (2018)
- The Burning (1981)
- The Burning Bed (1984) (TV)
- A Burning Hot Summer (2011)
- Burning Paradise (1994)
- A Burning Passion: The Margaret Mitchell Story (1994) (TV)
- The Burning Plain (2008)
- The Burning Season: (1994 TV & 2008)
- The Burning Soil (1922)
- Burnt (2015)
- Burnt Money (2000)
- Burnt Offerings (1976)
- Burnt by the Sun (1995)
- Burroughs (1983)
- Bury My Heart at Wounded Knee (2007) (TV)
- Bus 174 (2003)
- Bus Stop: (1956 & 2012)
- The Bus Uncle (2006)
- The Bushido Blade (1981)
- Bushido, Samurai Saga (1963)
- Bushwacked (1995)
- The Business (2005)
- A Business Affair (1994)
- A Business Buccaneer (1912)
- Business Is Business (1971)
- The Business of Strangers (2002)
- Business as Usual (1987)
- Buster (1988)
- Buster's Mal Heart (2016)
- Bustin' Loose (1981)
- Busting (1974)
- The Busy Body (1967)
- A Busy Day (1914)
- A Busy Night (2016)
- But Always (2014)
- But I'm a Cheerleader (1999)
- Butch Cassidy and the Sundance Kid (1969)
- The Butcher: (1970 & 2009)
- The Butcher Boy: (1917 & 1997)
- Butcher, Baker, Nightmare Maker (1981)
- The Butcher's Wife (1991)
- The Butler (2013)
- Butter: (1998 & 2011)
- Butter Battle Book (1989)
- Butter on the Latch (2013)
- Butterfield 8 (1960)
- Butterflies Are Free (1972)
- The Butterfly Effect series:
  - The Butterfly Effect (2004)
  - The Butterfly Effect 2 (2006)
  - The Butterfly Effect 3: Revelations (2009)
- Butterfly and Flowers (1985)
- Butterfly Kiss (1995)
- A Butterfly in the Night (1977)
- The Butterfly Tattoo (2008)
- Butterfly Tongues (1999)
- The Butterfly Tree (2017)
- Butterfly on a Wheel (2007)
- A Butterfly on the Wheel (1915)
- The Butterfly's Dream: (1994 & 2013)
- Buud Yam (1997)
- Buzz Lightyear of Star Command: The Adventure Begins (2000)
- Buzzard (2014)

=== Bw ===
- Bwana Devil (1952)

=== By ===
- By Another Name (2025)
- By Any Means: (2016 & 2026)
- By Any Name (2016)
- By Appointment Only: (1933 & 2007)
- By Berwin Banks (1920)
- By the Bluest of Seas (1936)
- By the Book (2013)
- By Candlelight (1933)
- By Coincidence (2014)
- By Dawn's Early Light (1990 TV)
- By Design: (1982 & 2025)
- By Divine Right (1924)
- By the False Door (1950)
- By the Fireplace (1917)
- By Force (2005)
- By the Grace of God (2019)
- By the Gun (2014)
- By Hook or Crook (1918)
- By Hook or by Crook: (1980 & 2001)
- By Indian Post (1919)
- By Killing (1965)
- By the Lake (1969)
- By the Law (1926)
- By the Light of the Moon (1911)
- By the Light of the Silvery Moon (1953)
- By the Light of a Star (1941)
- By Love Possessed (1961)
- By a Man's Face Shall You Know Him (1966)
- By My Side (2017)
- By My Side Again (1999)
- By og land hand i hand (1937)
- By Order of the Emperor (1957)
- By Order of Pompadour (1924)
- By the People (2005)
- By the People: The Election of Barack Obama (2009)
- By Player (2000)
- By the Pricking of My Thumbs (2005)
- By Quantum Physics: A Nightlife Venture (2019)
- By Reason of Insanity (1982 TV)
- By Right of Birth (1921)
- By Right of Possession (1917)
- By Right of Purchase (1918)
- By the Sad Sea Waves (1917)
- By the Sea: (1915, 1982 & 2015)
- By the Shortest of Heads (1915)
- By a Silken Thread (1938)
- By the Stream (2024)
- By the Sun's Rays (1914)
- By the Sweat of Your Brow (1949)
- By the Sword (1991)
- By the Time It Gets Dark (2016)
- By Touch (1986)
- By Two Love (2022)
- By Whose Hand?: (1927 & 1932)
- By a Woman's Wit (1911)
- By the World Forgot (1918)
- By Your Leave (1934)

==== Bya–Byz ====
- Byari (2011)
- Bydlo (2012)
- Bye (2019)
- Bye Bye Africa (1999)
- Bye Bye Baby (1988)
- Bye Bye Bangkok (2011)
- Bye bye, Barbara (1969)
- Bye Bye Barry (2023)
- Bye Bye Birdie: (1963 & 1995 TV)
- Bye Bye Blackbird (2005)
- Bye Bye Blondie (2012)
- Bye, Bye Bluebeard (1949)
- Bye Bye Bluebird (1999)
- Bye Bye Blues (1989)
- Bye Bye Braverman (1968)
- Bye Bye Brazil (1979)
- Bye, Bye, Buddy (1929)
- Bye Bye Dubai (2016)
- Bye Bye Germany (2017)
- Bye Bye Havana (2005)
- Bye Bye Love (1995)
- The Bye Bye Man (2017)
- Bye Bye Monkey (1978)
- Bye Bye Morons (2020)
- Bye Bye Tiberias (2023)
- Bye June (1998)
- Bye, See You Monday (1979)
- Bye-Bye (1995)
- Bye-Bye Jupiter (1984)
- Bygones (1987)
- Byl jednou jeden polda (1995)
- Byleth: The Demon of Incest (1972)
- The Bypass (2003)
- Bypass to Happiness (1934)
- Bypass to Life (1961)
- Bypass Road (2019)
- Byron (2003 TV)
- Byzantium (2012)

Previous: List of films: A Next: List of films: C

== See also ==
- Lists of films
- Lists of actors
- List of film and television directors
- List of documentary films
- List of film production companies
