= Bicycle Days (film) =

- Directed by: Devyani Anant
- Written by: Devyani Anant
- Story by: Devyani Ananat
- Produced by: Dhanshri Rode; Deepa Sule; Devyani Anant
- Starring: Darshit Khanwe; Soham Shah; Rishabh Sah
- Cinematography: P Kalyani Sunil
- Edited by: B Mahanteshwar
- Music by: Keyur Bhagat
- Production company: Katharsis Films
- Release date: 14 April 2023
- Country: India
- Language: Hindi

Bicycle days is a 2023 Hindi language drama film produced under the banner of Katharsis films directed by Devyani Anant.

== Production ==
The film is produced by Dhanshri Rode, Deepa Sule and Devyani Anant. Devyani Anant has also directed and penned the story of the film. Music by Keyur Bhagat, lyrics by Saheb Shrey and background score by Vivek Abhishek.

== Cast ==
- Darshit Khanwe as Aashish
- Soham Shah as Shekhar Choudhary
- Rishabh Sah as Chetan
- Parv Agarwal as Gautam
- Mudit Gunhere as Sunil
- Mitul Gupte as Lakshman
- Nidhi Dewan as Urmila
- Umesh Shukla as Dadaji
- Vinod Prasad Gyas as Clerk
