= The Beautiful Hen Behind Yao Mountain =

2020 Malawian romantic film

- Directed by: Imran Kingsly Shaban
- Written by: Imran Kingsly Shaban
- Produced by: Imran Pitersen Kaisi
- Starring: Ken Kananji; Bertha Nkhoma; Abdullah; Kamlanje Fantasia Mkwamba
- Cinematography: Imran Pitersen Kaisi
- Edited by: Imran Pitersen Kaisi
- Music by: Shaib Albe
- Release date: 2019
- Running time: 71 minutes
- Country: Malawi
- Languages: English; Chewa

The Unbroken Spirit, is a 2019 Malawian romantic drama film directed by Imran Kingsly Shaban and produced by Imran Pitersen Kaisi.

The film stars Ken Kananji and Bertha Nkhoma in lead roles whereas Abdullah and Kamlanje Fantasia Mkwamba made supportive roles. The film was shot in the Mangochi District of Malawi at Che Moto Village.

The film received critics acclaim and screened worldwide. In 2019, the film was nominated for the Southern African Filmmaking competition of the Sotambe Documentary and Arts Film Festival in Zambia. In the same year, the film was screened at the Bayelsa International Film Festival, Nigeria. It is also the third Malawian film ever to be nominated for the Best Movie –Southern Africa category at the 2020 Africa Magic Viewers' Choice Awards (AMCVAs).

== Cast ==
- Ken Kananji as Amadu
- Bertha Nkhoma as Asuwema
- Abdullah as John
- Kamlanje Fantasia Mkwamba as Abiti Daudi
