= Blund's Lullaby =

2017 Swedish supernatural horror short film

- Directed by: Magda Lindblom; Amanda Nilsson
- Written by: Magda Lindblom; Amanda Nilsson
- Produced by: Magda Lindblom; Amanda Nilsson
- Starring: Agnes Melin; Mathilda Melin
- Release date: September 14, 2017
- Running time: 2 minutes
- Country: Sweden

Blund's Lullaby is a 2017 Swedish two-minute-long horror short film directed, produced and written by Magda Lindblom and Amanda Nilsson. The short film is set in The Conjuring Universe and was made for the "My Annabelle Creation" contest which it won for Sweden. It was released September 14, 2017, on YouTube. Its plot concerns John Blund, the Nordic version of the Sandman that haunts a little girl going to sleep.

== Production ==
The short film stars Agnes and Mathilda Melin.
