= Beside Me =

- Romanian poster of the movie
- Directed by: Tedy Necula
- Written by: Alexandra Axinte
- Produced by: Tedy Necula
- Starring: Constantin Cotimanis; Adrian Păduraru; Teodora Mareș; Victoria Cociaș-Șerban; Emilian Oprea; Constantin Drăgănescu; Ela Ionescu; Dan Murzea; Iulia Dumitru
- Production company: Filmărie
- Release date: 26 October 2018
- Running time: 84 minutes
- Country: Romania
- Language: Romanian
- Budget: 120.000 euros
- Box office: $53,828.67

Beside me (original title in Romanian: Coborâm la prima) is a 2018 independent Romanian movie, directed by Tedy Necula. The plot takes place one day after the Colectiv nightclub fire in a metro car that is stuck between two stations. The movie was shot partially in a metro car, with the rest on a built set. It was released in Romanian theaters on October 26, 2018, grossing $53,828.67.

== Plot ==
In the morning after the Colectiv club fire, several strangers remain blocked in the metro between two subway stations. The metro contains people dealing with personal issues, on top of which is added the tragedy of the Colectiv disaster:

- a Moldavian middle-aged woman who has been searching for a relationship. She befriends the businessman and starts flirting with him
- a dysfunctional couple that has money trouble and try to reconcile in the metro.
- a man newly released from the prison that has a connection with a mother with a handicapped child.
- an old Romanian couple that judges everyone in the metro, especially a young boy who they think is a drug addict.
- another couple has just found out that their child was in the Colectiv fire and had died.
- a priest that is concealing his profession because of the fear of being bullied. After the Colectiv fire, a lot of priests blamed the people's taste in music for the catastrophe, as such, all the priests were targeted by the Romanian society.
- a group of young people that have friends that were at the nightclub and are desperately trying to get a hold of them

== Cast ==
- Teodora Mareș as the wife
- Adrian Păduraru as the husband
- Constantin Cotimanis as the priest
- Tudorel Filimon as the man who plays the accordion
- Emilian Oprea as the businessman
- Iulia Dumitru as the Moldavian woman
- Constantin Drăgănescu as the old man
- Victoria Cociaș as the old woman
- Gavril Pătru as the father
- Ela Ionescu as the mother of the handicapped child
- Grumăzescu Cezar as the gay man
- Iulian Burciu as a ruffian
- Iulia Alexandra Neacșu as a student
- Ada Dumitru as a student
- Dan Murzea as Daniel, an ex-prisoner
- Ionuț Gurgu as a traveler
- Andrei Eftene as a hipster
- Radu Catana as a student

== Production ==
The main part of the movie was shot inside an actual metro but due to the budget, an improvised metro was built in the production studio Filmărie in Bucharest. Tedy Necula stated that he and his team built the metro in the production room in just 7 days.

The movie entered cinemas on the 26th of October 2018.

== Music ==
The soundtrack has two songs by the band Goodbye to Gravity, which was the band playing that night in Colectiv Club when the fire started. Tedy Necula said in an interview for Digi24 that he had the idea of the movie for several years but he wanted to link it to an important day for Romanians so he decided to put the story the second day after the Colectiv club fire. He wanted to have the music from the Goodbye to Gravity band so that the message would be more powerful.

== Reception ==
The movie was received well by the critics. They said that it was not just a movie about the Colectiv club fire. It was also meant to be taken as an inspirational film that spread kindness and humanity in Romanian society. Vice wrote that it is a movie that shows how people are changed by a tragedy. The famous line of the movie, "We are strangers until something unites us" has become a staple of the Colectiv tragedy. Moreover, it impressed critics with the mixture of feelings that it made people feel.

Claudia Moscovici writes that it is a "cinematic thought-experiment".

== Awards ==
- 2018 - Militello Film Festival - Best editing (Ana Țurcanu)
- 2018 - Indie IPIFF - Best debut (Tedy Necula)

== See also ==
- Colectiv nightclub fire
- Goodbye to Gravity

== Bibliography ==
- "Coboram la prima". cinemagia. 2022-06-12. Archived from the original on 2021-02-26.
- "Coboram la prima". aarc. 2022-06-12. Archived from the original on 2020-07-17.
- Constanda, Alexandra (2017-07-24). "Unii dintre cei mai buni actori din România filmează "Coborâm la prima", a cărui acţiune are loc în ziua de după tragedia din Colectiv". adevarul. Archived from the original on 2019-11-05.
- Grosu, Roxana (2020-04-05). "Povestea lui Tedy Necula, regizorul cu tetrapareză, care câștigă 250.000 de euro pe an". wall-street. Archived from the original on 2021-02-26.
- Moscovici, Claudia (2022-02-12). "Heartwarming Encounters:Tedy Necula's Beside me (Coborim la prima)". panodyssey. Archived from the original on 2022-06-14.
- Nanu, Crăița (2018-11-02). "Filmul românesc care-ți arată cum se transformă oamenii după o tragedie". Vice. Archived from the original on 2022-06-08.
- "#Colectiv. Tedy Necula, copilul cu tetrapareză din "Noro", debutează ca regizor de lungmetraj". Digi24. 2018-10-29. Archived from the original on 2022-06-14.
