= Being Claudine =

- Directed by: I-fan Quirk
- Written by: I-fan Quirk; Justine Lichtman
- Produced by: I-fan Quirk (producer); Jackie Stolfi (co-producer); Robin Berla Meyers (line producer)
- Starring: Justine Lichtman; Musashi Alexander; Rose Arrick; James Bowman; Jordan Cael; Randall Ehrmann; Heidi Horst; Russ Vigilante; Reg Wyns
- Cinematography: Matthew C. Brookman
- Edited by: Mary M. Torras
- Music by: Christopher McGlumphy
- Production company: First Generation Productions
- Release dates: October 21, 2000 (Fort Worth Film Festival); July 19, 2002 (New York City)
- Running time: 85 minutes
- Country: United States
- Language: English

Being Claudine is a 2000 American romantic comedy film directed by I-fan Quirk. The film follows the hapless love life of its central character, fledgling New York City actress Claudine Bloomberg, played by Justine Lichtman. Being Claudine began life as a student film; it was director I-fan Quirk's thesis project for New York University. The film made its public debut at the Fort Worth Film Festival in Fort Worth, Texas, on October 21, 2000. It was given a limited theatrical release in New York City on July 19, 2002, where it received negative reviews from critics.

== Reception ==
Critical reception to Being Claudine was overwhelmingly negative. The film received a rating of 17 out of 100 on review aggregate Metacritic, indicating "Universal dislike or disgust" from critics. The Village Voice stated that "Savaging wooden, graceless, derivative student films is, admittedly, like punting a three-legged puppy, but that's what Quirk and his breed get for so stupidly undervaluing filmgoers' time." The New York Post described the film as a "feeble shot at a screwball comedy". The New York Times described Being Claudine as a "good-natured but amateurish film". The A.V. Club stated that the film "grinds through a shopworn plot" and derided I-fan Quirk's direction, opining that "Quirk provides nothing to get excited about; even when he cuts frames to speed conversations along, his pacing stumbles, and his dialogue isn't worth suffering through all the awkward pauses." Variety stated: "Though competently shot (on film, no less) and framed by helmer I-Fan Quirk, pic is quickly overtaken by an urge to let its sincere but dull characters chat away endlessly." The Chicago Reader described Being Claudine as "no more memorable than an episode of Caroline in the City." One of the film's only positive reviews came from Film Threat, which stated that "Justine Lichtman is consistently funny and watchable even when she's doing nothing."
