= A Batalha do Passinho =

2012 film directed by Emílio Domingos

- Theatrical release poster
- Directed by: Emílio Domingos
- Written by: Emílio Domingos; Julia Mariano
- Edited by: Guilherme Schumann
- Music by: Vinimax
- Production company: Osmose Filmes
- Distributed by: Cine Santa Filmes
- Release dates: 6 October 2012 (Festival of Rio); 11 October 2013 (Brazil)
- Running time: 72 minutes
- Country: Brazil
- Language: Portuguese

A Batalha do Passinho (lit. 'Passinho Battle' or 'The Battle of Passinho'; English release title Passinho Dance-Off) is a 2012 Brazilian documentary film directed by Emílio Domingos. The film follows a dance known as passinho, which emerged from the funk carioca scene in the early 2000s.

== Synopsis ==
The style of dancing which developed in the favelas of Rio de Janeiro and is known as passinho evolved out of the funk carioca culture. After a video of a group of friends at a barbecue, Passinho Foda, received four million hits on YouTube, dancers from other communities began to upload their own home-made clips, and the dance quickly spreads across the city. The documentary shows the dancers and the phenomenon expanding beyond the bailes, slums and DJs.

== See also ==
- Battle of the year
