= Ipolohagos Natassa =

Ipolochagos Natassa Υπολοχαγός Νατάσσα
- Directed by: Nikos Foskolos
- Written by: Nikos Foskolos
- Starring: Aliki Vougiouklaki; Dimitris Papamichael; Costas Carras
- Cinematography: Yorgos Arvanitis; Nicos Gardellis; Dimos Sakelariou
- Edited by: Vassilis Syropoulos
- Music by: Kostas Kapnisis
- Release dates: 21 December 1970 (Greece); 8 April 1980
- Running time: 124 minutes
- Country: Greece
- Language: Greek

Ipolochagos Natassa (Greek: Υπολοχαγός Νατάσσα, Lieutenant Natasha, also known outside Greece as Battlefield Constantinople) is a 1970 Greek film. It starred Aliki Vougiouklaki as Natassa, Dimitris Papamichael as Orestis, and Costas Carras as Max. The story about the German occupation of Greece and the resistance by the Greeks. The director of the film is Nikos Foskolos.

== Plot ==
Dachau 1965. Natassa Arseni has been absent from Greece for over 20 years. Shortly before returning, she visits the former concentration camp. On the train back home, she begins to remember the years of occupation. At that time, among the German officers was her fellow student at the conservatory, Max Neuter, who became an SS lieutenant, even though his mother was Greek. Max was hunting Orestes, a partisan whom Natassa helped twice, once in Kopaida and once in Athens. She also remembered the adventures she went through before meeting him, her marriage that was almost interrupted by Max, the child they had together, as well as the arrest and torture she suffered at the hands of Max himself. She also remembered how he saved her from the firing squad that Max sent her, as well as his assassination by Greek partisans, who thought he was a German.

== Cast ==
- Aliki Vougiouklaki as Natassa Arseni
- Dimitris Papamichael as Orestis
- Costas Carras as Max Reuter
- Eleni Zafeiriou as Natassa's mother
- Kakia Panagiotou as Liza
- Andreas Filippidis as Natassa's father
- Spyros Kalogirou as major

== Production ==
The scene where the injured protagonist on the carriage goes to the church was filmed in Spata, Attica, and more specifically at 59 Mycenaikon Tafon Street, where it is not at all herself. The actress who plays the roma is Malaina Anousaki, mother of fellow actress Eleni Anousaki.

== Reception ==
The film sold over 751,000 tickets in its first screening, making it the biggest commercial success since the beginning of Greek cinema, a record that stood until 1999.
