= Becoming Warren Buffett =

- Written by: Chris Chuang
- Directed by: Peter W. Kunhardt

Original release
- Network: HBO
- Release: January 30, 2017

Becoming Warren Buffett is a 2017 documentary film about Warren Buffett and his life. The film was made for HBO.

== Synopsis ==
The documentary covers the life and career of Warren Buffett, who is widely regarded as one of the most successful and influential investors of the 20th century.

Buffett is interviewed extensively on his upbringing, his early facility with mathematics and interest in investing, and his time as a young adult studying under Benjamin Graham to learn the principles of value investing (which are outlined with a series of short animated segments).

Buffett's friends, family and colleagues are featured in interviews, including his wife Susan Buffett and his longtime business partner Charlie Munger.

== Critical reception ==
The New Yorker analyzed the dichotomy between Warren Buffett's investing prowess and personal relationship skills. The review commented, "There's another paradox the film hints at, too: the qualities that made it challenging for Buffett to deal with people are the very qualities that made him such a brilliant investor." The New Yorker observed, "It's also about an ability to divorce yourself from emotion, to be rational at a time when other people are acting irrationally, and to be calm when others are fearful."

The New York Times noted the documentary told Buffett's biography "in a relatively new way". The review commented that, though the overall portrayal of the man was positive, it also described Buffett, "as something of a remarkable human computer, gifted with numbers and less so with interpersonal relationships."

Money observed the film is, "Chock full of the traditionalist eccentricities the 'oracle of Omaha' is best known for–like his love of Coca Cola, and the fact that he lives in the same house he bought in 1958 for $31,500". Money pointed out that the documentary went more in-depth than these specifics about Buffett, and "reveals a surprising set of facts even Buffett die hards may have missed."

According to the film critic news aggregation analysis on Rotten Tomatoes, the documentary garnered positive reviews from the Los Angeles Times and The Washington Post, and a negative review from Entertainment Weekly.
