= Cinema of Slovakia =

- No. of screens: 209 (2011)
  - Per capita: 4.2 per 100,000 (2011)
- Main distributors: Continental Film 32.0% Tatrafilm 31.0% Itafilm 11.0%

Produced feature films (2015)
- Fictional: 12 (46.2%)
- Animated: 3 (11.5%)
- Documentary: 11 (42.3%)

Number of admissions (2011)
- Total: 3,603,544
  - Per capita: 0.64 (2012)
- National films: 362,648 (10.1%)

Gross box office (2011)
- Total: €17.3 million
- National films: €1.53 million (8.9%)

The cinema of Slovakia encompasses a range of themes and styles typical of European cinema. Yet there are a certain number of recurring themes that are visible in the majority of the important works. These include rural settings, folk traditions, and carnival. Even in the field of experimental film-making, there is frequently a celebration of nature and tradition, as for example in Dušan Hanák's Pictures of the Old World (Obrazy starého sveta, 1972). The same applies to blockbusters like Juraj Jakubisko's A Thousand-Year Old Bee (Tisícročná včela, 1983). The percentage of comedies, adventures, musicals, sci-fi films and similar genres has been low by comparison to dramas and historical films that used to include a notable subset of social commentaries on events from the decade or two preceding the film. One of them, Ján Kadár's and Elmar Klos' The Shop on Main Street (Obchod na korze, 1965), gave Slovak (as well as Czech and generally Czechoslovak) filmmaking its first Oscar. Children's films were a perennial genre from the 1960s through the 1980s produced mainly as low-budget films by Slovak Television Bratislava. The themes of recent films have been mostly contemporary.

The center of Slovak filmmaking has been the Koliba studio (whose formal name changed several times) in Bratislava. Some films conceived at the Barrandov Studios in Prague have had Slovak themes, actors, directors, and occasionally language, while Prague-based filmmakers and actors have sometimes worked in Slovakia. In line with Slovak, Hungarian, and Czech histories, their past sharing of the Kingdom of Hungary and Czechoslovakia, there is early overlap between Slovak and Hungarian film, and later between Slovak and Czech film. Some films are easily sorted out as one or the other, some films belong meaningfully to more than one national cinema.

Some 350 Slovak feature films have been made in the history of Slovak cinema. It has produced some notable cinematic works that have been well received by critics, as well as some domestic blockbusters. In recent years, Slovak films have often been made by working (wholly or partly) with foreign production companies. Joint Slovak and Czech projects have been particularly common. The Slovak film industry has been dogged by lack of money intensified by the country's small audience (2.9–5.4 million inhabitants), which translates to the films' limited potential for primary, domestic revenue.

== History ==
=== Early 20th century ===
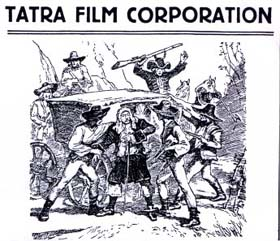
US Film company (defunct in 1922) poster

A Slovak-themed drama, Snowdrop from the Tatras (Sněženka z Tatier, dir. Olaf Larus-Racek, 1919), about a maturing girl looking for her place in a city appeared within months of the creation of Czechoslovakia. The first Slovak full-length feature movie was Jaroslav Siakeľ's Jánošík in 1921. It placed Slovak filmmaking among the earlier 10 cinemas in the world to produce such a film. Other feature films were released early, but the absence of a permanent local studio and the competition from the emerging conglomerate of studios and distributors (AB Studio, later Barrandov) in nearby Prague proved daunting. An early international recognition came from the International Venice Film Festival for Karol Plicka's The Earth Sings (Zem spieva, 1933). Martin Frič's Jánošík of 1935 was released internationally, including in Italy and Germany, and was shown in Slovak-American communities until the 1950s.

The first Department of Film in Czechoslovakia (probably the third such department in Europe) was opened at the School of Industrial Arts in Bratislava in 1938, headed by Plicka and with the future Oscar-winning director Ján Kadár among the students, but it was closed after Slovakia's independence in 1939.

=== The 1940s ===
The authorities set up the short-film studio Nástup ("Muster"), the precursor of the Koliba Studio, to produce newsreels during World War II, but it made no feature films during that period. Although with a substantial post-war makeover and change of name, the studio continued its production after Czechoslovakia was partly reconstituted in 1945, and the feature film industry began to take off. During a brief period after the war, the Communists had not yet gained full control, allowing one or two interesting films to be made in the Central European countries, including Paľo Bielik's Wolves' Lairs (Vlčie diery, 1948) in Slovakia. The Communist Party, which valued the propaganda potential of cinema, took power in Czechoslovakia in the coup d'état of 1948.

=== The 1950s ===
Within a few years, film production was heavily controlled by the state and films were not allowed to undermine Stalinism. Psychologising was frowned upon and characters became cardboard cut-outs subservient to political ideals. A dominant feature of film poetics of this period was descriptive-symbolic stylization. Even the titles of films like Dam (Priehrada, Paľo Bielik, 1950), Young Hearts (Mladé srdcia, Václav Kubásek, 1952), and Hamlets Have Started Off (Lazy sa pohli, Paľo Bielik, 1952) were designed to represent social and societal change. The title of The Struggle Will End Tomorrow (Boj sa skončí zajtra, Miroslav Cikán, 1951) symbolized the irreversibility of what was shown to be the progress of the working class. The name of the leading character in Kathy (Katka, Ján Kadár, 1949) was popular at the time, and so her "ascent" to an industrial laborer was laid out as a better future for thousands of young women.

Unlike their colleagues in Prague and neighboring countries in the first years after the Communist takeovers, the Slovak directors of development were consistently unable to "meet the plan" outlined by the Communist Party and were unsuccessful in drafting the required number of socialist-realist projects, which affected the number of films passed for production although the money for them would have been made available by the authorities. Most of the resulting films were neither popular nor critically acclaimed. Exceptions among the former included Josef Mach's folkloric musical Native Country (Rodná zem, 1953) with ticket sales, relative to population, among the highest in Slovak filmmaking. Across the Communist-ruled part of Central Europe, there was a recognition that for an active and popular film industry to exist, film-makers should be given more control of production. This process accelerated towards the end of the 1950s.

=== The 1960s ===
According to a 1990s poll of film specialists, five of the ten best Slovak films were made in the 1960s. As in neighbouring countries, the early 1960s saw the fruition of the policy of relaxation, which mixed powerfully with external cinematic influences such as Italian Neorealism and the French New Wave to produce Slovakia's first international film successes. Although there were isolated successful feature films from Slovakia leading up to the 1960s, the first Slovak film to make a well-marked international impact was not produced until 1962 — Štefan Uher's The Sun in a Net (Slnko v sieti). It is frequently thought of as an aesthetic precursor to the Czechoslovak New Wave, which emerged over the following years. Its opaque symbolism and anti-propagandist themes caused it to be harshly criticized by the First Secretary of the Communist Party of Slovakia.

Another important work from this time was Peter Solan's The Boxer and Death (Boxer a smrť, 1962), which was set in a Nazi concentration camp and directly tackled the Holocaust. The Boxer and Death was one of a series of Czechoslovak films from the 1960s that looked back at the moral dilemmas of ordinary people caught up in the Second World War and encouraged viewers to re-evaluate their responses to the war. Many of these films chose the Holocaust as their focus, and Slovak director Ján Kadár, co-directing with frequent collaborator, Czech director Elmar Klos, achieved a major international success in this genre with the Czech-produced, Slovak-language The Shop on Main Street (Obchod na korze), which won a Special Mention when it played at the Cannes Film Festival in 1965 and went on to win the Oscar for Best Foreign-Language Film the following year.

The Czech feature The Cremator (Spalovač mrtvol, 1968), Slovak-born Juraj Herz's grotesque black comedy about the social context of the Final Solution, is a cult film in both Czechia and Slovakia and has an increasing reputation internationally. Herz is a concentration camp survivor, but he never made a film directly addressing that experience.

The second half of the decade saw the emergence of a new generation of directors. Three of their films were still ranked among the ten best Slovak films in a poll of film academics and critics in the late 1990s that also listed The Sun in a Net and The Shop on Main Street. By comparison to earlier Slovak films, the three leaned towards avant-garde filmmaking and were consequently more successful in art houses than in wide release: Juraj Jakubisko's two features Deserters and Pilgrims (Zbehovia a pútnici, 1968) and Birdies, Orphans and Fools (Vtáčkovia, siroty a blázni, 1969) and Dušan Hanák's 322 (the code for cancer in medical records of diseases, 1969).

=== The 1970s ===
Following the Soviet-led invasion of Czechoslovakia in 1968, firm government control was regained over the film industry. Almost all of the major Slovak directors initially found it more difficult to work. Dušan Hanák's acclaimed feature-length documentary Pictures of the Old World (Obrazy starého sveta, 1972) sought a possible refuge in a topic sufficiently removed from big politics to survive on the margins of official production and yet, executed with a finesse that gave it a wide international appeal. It visited remote, trapped places in order to meditate on what lies hidden beneath the concept of "an authentic life". An elegiac work whose images could apply to Appalachia or any other poor region, Pictures of the Old World still offended the authorities and the distribution was stopped two days after its limited release.

Despite the circumstances, only one film, Martin Hollý Jr.'s Fever (Horúčka, 1975), was produced to advance the Communist Party's coercively negative view of the unprecedented relaxation of communism in 1968. Dušan Hanák was able to make his poetically realistic Rosy Dreams (Ružové sny, 1976), the first Central European feature film with the Roma at the core of the story and a singular creative achievement of the decade. Popular entertainment was briefly served by Martin Ťapák's Pacho, the Highwayman of Hybe (Pacho, hybský zbojník, 1976), a spoof on the legend of Jánošík that had already appeared in several Slovak and Polish film versions. Government control was generally greater in the Federal Capital of Prague than it was in Bratislava, Slovak Capital, so some directors from Prague made films in Slovak part of the federation to avoid restrictions on film-making in the Czech part, including Juraj Herz (returning to his native country) and Jan Švankmajer.

=== The 1980s ===
The more relaxed conditions became apparent in the 1980s when Slovakia had perhaps its most successful film-making period, and acclaimed directors from the 1960s who had been able to make only short films (Juraj Jakubisko) or only an occasional feature (Dušan Hanák) returned with important and mature works. Highlights from this period include Hanák's I Love, You Love (Ja milujem, ty miluješ, 1989), Jakubisko's A Thousand-Year Old Bee (Tisícročná včela, 1983), Uher's She Grazed Horses on Concrete, AKA A Ticket to Heaven (Pásla kone na betóne, 1982), Martin Hollý's Signum Laudis (1980), Zoro Záhon's The Assistant (Pomocník, 1982) and Dušan Rapoš's A Fountain for Susan (Fontána pre Zuzanu, 1986). This streak of successful film-making is all the more remarkable given that in other Communist countries the 1980s, especially the late '80s, were generally speaking a fallow time, particularly in the Czech Republic.

=== The 1990s ===
In contrast to the 1980s, the decade following 1990 was one of the worst in the history of Slovak cinema. Only a few full-length feature films were produced in this period (36 films with major Slovak participation between 1992 and 2002) and interest in domestic films practically vanished. The reasons for this were a desperate lack of money in Slovak culture as a result of the transformation of Slovakia's economy following the Velvet Revolution, the decrease in potential audience by the split of Czechoslovakia in 1993, and a sharp decrease in the previous high subsidies for culture and film provided by the Communist government. Ironically, the work of the only major Slovak director to emerge in this period, Martin Šulík, has been more popular internationally, and particularly in the Czech Republic and Poland, than in his native country.

Also, under Prime Minister Vladimír Mečiar, the Koliba Film Studio was privatized in 1995 and within two years Mečiar's children are said to have held an 80% stake in the company. Allegations of asset stripping and fraud dogged the company, and after Mečiar was voted out of office in 1998 the Ministry of Culture sued Koliba to recover money given to make feature films that were not produced, one of a number of suits launched by the post-Mečiar government in relation to companies that had been privatized by Mečiar. The legal action dragged on through the early 2000s and did nothing to clarify the position of Koliba, effectively prolonging the stagnation and leaving the studios dilapidated and in disrepair.

Nevertheless, the Slovak film industry did not completely grind to a halt and important post-Communist era films include Šulík's Everything I Like (Všetko čo mam rád, 1992), and The Garden (Záhrada, 1995), both lyrical films that depict tense father-son relationships, and Vlado Balco's Rivers of Babylon (1998), which is sometimes interpreted as a critical allegory of Mečiar's rise to power. Juraj Jakubisko, working in Prague, made An ambiguous report about the end of the world (Nejasná zpráva o konci světa, 1997), at the time the most expensive film ever made in the Czech Republic.

The cinematographer Martin Štrba has also been highly successful in this period, being respected in both Czechia and Slovakia. He collaborates regularly with Martin Šulík and the Czech director Vladimír Michálek and has also worked with the Czech New Wave icon Věra Chytilová.

In 1999, an international film festival was started in Bratislava in an attempt to foster a better environment for making feature films and larger appreciation among Slovak audiences.

== Questions over national origin ==
Given that in the periods from the invention of film in 1896 to 1938 and from 1945 to 1992 Slovakia did not exist as an independent country, there has been some controversy over the naming of certain films as specifically either Slovak or Czech. Although the Czech and Slovak halves of Czechoslovakia each had separate languages, they were close enough for film talent to move freely between the two republics. As a result, during the Czechoslovak period — and even after it — a number of Slovak directors made Czech-language films in Prague, including Juraj Herz and Juraj Jakubisko.

Particularly intense debate arose in the 1990s around the Oscar-winning The Shop on Main Street, which was jointly directed by one Budapest-born Jewish Slovak director (Ján Kadár) and one Czech director (Elmar Klos), based on a short story written in Czech by Jewish Slovak author Ladislav Grosman, financed by the central authorities through the film's studio at Prague and shot on location in Slovakia in Slovak with Slovak actors. Czechs generally consider the film to be Czech (while they see the theme as Slovak) on the basis of the film's studio and the home of its directors; Slovaks generally consider the film to be Slovak on the basis of its language, themes, and filming locations.

== Notable films ==
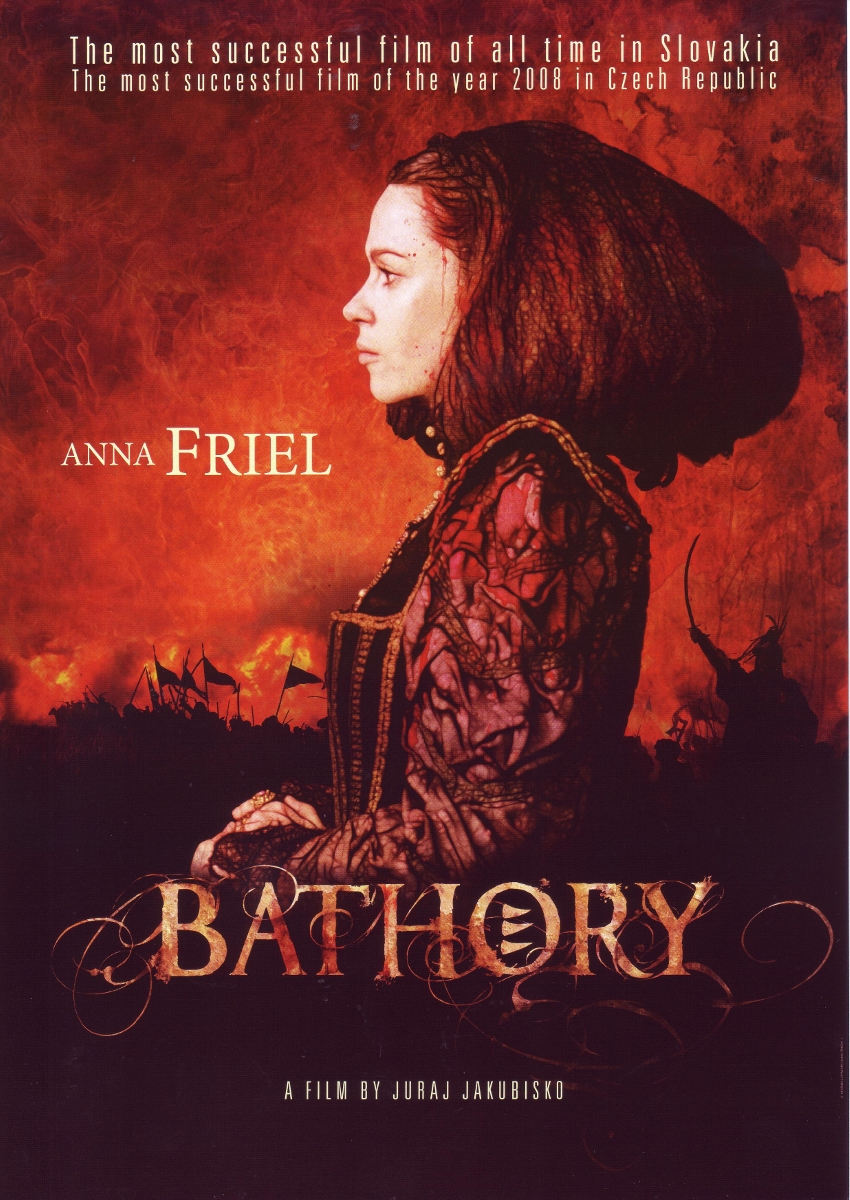
Bathory, theatrical release poster, the most expensive Slovak film.

- Soul at Peace (Pokoj v duši, 2009, Vladimír Balko)
- Blind Loves (Slepé lásky, 2008, Juraj Lehotský)
- Bathory (Bathory 2008, Juraj Jakubisko)
- The Garden (Záhrada, 1995, Martin Šulík)
- Paper Heads (Papierové hlavy, 1995, Dušan Hanák)
- Sitting on a Branch, Enjoying Myself (Sedím na konári a je mi dobre, 1989, Juraj Jakubisko)
- The Millennial Bee (Tisícročná včela, 1983, Juraj Jakubisko)
- She Grazed Horses on Concrete (Pásla kone na betóne, 1982, Štefan Uher)
- Night Riders (Noční jazdci, 1981, Martin Hollý)
- I Love, You Love (Ja milujem, ty miluješ, 1980/1988, Dušan Hanák)
- Rosy Dreams (Ružové sny, 1977, Dušan Hanák)
- Pictures of the Old World (Obrazy starého sveta, 1972, Dušan Hanák)
- Eden and After (Eden a potom, L'Eden et après, 1970, Alain Robbe-Grillet)
- Birds, Orphans and Fools (Vtáčkovia, siroty a blázni, 1969, Juraj Jakubisko)
- 322 (322, 1969, Dušan Hanák)
- Deserters and Pilgrims (AKA The Deserters and the Nomads; Zbehovia a pútnici, 1968, Juraj Jakubisko)
- The Shop on Main Street (Obchod na korze, 1965, Ján Kadár, Elmar Klos)
- The Sun in a Net (Slnko v sieti, 1963, Štefan Uher)
- Wolves' Lairs (Vlčie diery, 1948, Paľo Bielik)
- The Earth Sings (Zem spieva, 1933, Karol Plicka)
- Jánošík (1921, Jaroslav Jerry Siakeľ)

== Directors ==
- Vlado Bahna
- Pavol Barabáš
- Stanislav Barabáš
- Paľo Bielik
- Eva Borušovičová
- Eduard Grečner
- Dušan Hanák
- Elo Havetta
- Juraj Herz
- Martin Hollý
- Juraj Jakubisko
- Ján Kadár
- Otakar Krivánek
- Viktor Kubal
- Leopold Lahola
- Andrej Lettrich
- Miroslav Luther
- Juraj Nvota
- Stanislav Párnický
- Peter Solan
- Martin Šulík
- Štefan Semjan
- Štefan Uher
- Martin Ťapák
- Dušan Trančík
- Jozef Zachar
- Ján Zeman

== Actors and actresses ==
- Michal Dočolomanský
- Janko Kroner
- Jozef Kroner
- Marián Labuda
- Tatiana Pauhofová
- Emília Vášáryová
- Magdaléna Vášáryová

== See also ==
- Cinema of the world
- List of Slovak films
