= Rosy Dreams =

- Directed by: Dušan Hanák
- Written by: Dušan Hanák; Dušan Dušek
- Starring: Juraj Nvota; Iva Bittová; Hana Slivková; Josef Hlinomaz
- Cinematography: Dodo Šimončič
- Edited by: Alfréd Benčič
- Music by: Petr Hapka
- Release date: 8 April 1977
- Running time: 80 minutes
- Country: Czechoslovakia
- Languages: Slovak; Romani

Rosy Dreams (Ružové sny) is a 1977 Czechoslovak film. Despite its whimsical poetic style, it was the first Central European feature film that put the Romani (Gypsy) community at the center stage in a realistically reflected manner. It was also a singular artistic achievement in Slovak and Czechoslovak cinema during the period after the Soviet invasion of 1968 by Dušan Hanák, director of several acclaimed films who maintained the integrity of his vision and style throughout the vagaries of Central European filmmaking in the second half of the 20th century. In a broader sense, Rosy Dreams was prescient in Central European cinema because it dealt with a minority group whose plight, not discussed openly then, has since become one of the key issues in several Central European societies. The clash of the communities is depicted with the subtle tender attitude inherited from the Czechoslovak New Wave.

== Plot summary ==
Jakub (Juraj Nvota), a dreamy mail carrier in a sleepy village, spends his days playing pranks on everyone, resenting his father (Anton Trón) with his mother's (Hana Slivková) tacit support, and admiring Jolana (Iva Bittová) from the neighboring Romani hamlet — until Jolana responds. Faced with mistrust from both Jakub's and Jolana's families and venom from segments of their communities, Jakub pulls one more, grave prank that, he imagines, will help support the two teenagers as they take the train to the nearby city in order to live together.

Yet, not only does Jakub's prank — a theft of money from the post office — catch up with him, but it turns out that the two of them have conflicting dreams about life. Jakub has dreamed up an urban version of the stereotypical fantasy of a free-spirited Gypsy life with Jolana, whereas she has dreamed of a grounded life away from her troubled community and applies herself to achieve that. While Jakub goes from fantasy to prison to fantasy, Jolana gets a steady job and begins to realize that Jakub is no more her fantasy of a down-to-earth Gojo (non-Rom) than she is his "Gypsy woman".

As Jolana, back in the Romani hamlet, celebrates her wedding to her persistent Romani suitor Vojto (Ján Žigo) and Jakub returns to his parents for more idle dreams, a Romani woman, the Town Hall administrator Irena (Sally Salingová), and a Slovak man, the Town Hall maintenance guy and volunteer firefighter Ondro (Milan Kiš), a more mature couple from a subsidiary plot, are getting married too.

== Director ==
Dušan Hanák (1938, Bratislava) graduated from the FAMU (Film and TV School of the Academy of Performing Arts) in Prague in 1965. He began with a series of shorts at the Koliba film studios in Bratislava. Several of them received awards, and so did his first feature film 322 (the code for cancer in medical records of diseases, 1969).

Hanák followed it with the still admired feature-length documentary Pictures of the Old World (Obrazy starého sveta, 1972), partly a meditation on what lies hidden beneath the concept of "an authentic life", a theme already addressed in 322. Although Hanák was treated with suspicion by the more repressive communist authorities that took over after the Warsaw Pact invasion of Czechoslovakia, he found an early refuge in a topic sufficiently removed from big politics to survive on the margins of official production and yet, executed with a finesse that gave it a wide international appeal. In the most extraordinary section, an old man talks with great fascination and lucidity about space travel, recalling how two astronauts walked on the Moon and collected rocks while a third circled in their spaceship. Tacked to the wall of his crumbling shack is a small photograph of men walking on the Moon. It is a beautiful, elegiac work whose images could apply to Appalachia or any other poor region. Good reviews or not, Pictures of the Old World was ordered shelved after the briefest of theatrical runs. Nevertheless, despite the authorities' surly take on Hanák's films, his next venture, Rosy Dreams, turned out to be another original work.

== Screenplay ==
The screenplay was Hanák's joint project with the writer Dušan Dušek (b. 1946). A graduate in natural history and geology, Dušek later became professor of screenwriting at the University of Performing Arts in Bratislava. The two wrote the screenplay during 1974–1975. The authorities delayed the shooting of Rosy Dreams for a year, because Hanák and Dušek refused to rewrite it with a socially optimistic ending that would have the two main characters getting married. Both authors did research in Romani settlements and fashioned their script accordingly. They hired Professor of Romani Studies Milena Hübschmannová (1933–2005) as consultant, who also helped with the Romani dialogues. Parts of the film were shot on location at Trhovište, an actual Romani village between Michalovce and Trebišov in eastern Slovakia, with all-Romani extras.

== Cast ==
Actor	Role
Juraj Nvota (b. 1954)	Jakub
Iva Bittová (b. 1958)	Jolana Danielová
Zuzana Kronerová (b. 1952)	Jolana Danielová (voice)
Hana Slivková (1923–1984)	Mother
Žofia Martišová (b. 1934)	Mother (voice)
Anton Trón (1926–1996)	Father
Štefan Figura (1910–2001)	Father (voice)
Josef Hlinomaz (1914–1978)	Uncle Anton
Ľudovít Greššo (1916–1982)	Uncle Anton (voice)
Libuše Havelková (b. 1924)	Post Office Manager Elenka
Václav Babka (b. 1927)	Mr. Babjak, postal employee
Marie Motlová (1918–1985)	Mrs. Múčková, woman with the chicken coop
Božena Slabejová (1930–2004)	Mrs. Múčková, woman with the chicken coop (voice)
Míla Beran (1904–1976)	Mr. Múčka, her husband
Dano Živojnovič (1905–1983)	Mr. Múčka, her husband (voice)
Naďa Hejná (1906–1994)	Granny
Sally Salingová	Irena, Town Hall administrator
Milan Kiš (1934–2007)	Ondro, Town Hall maintenance man, Irena' suitor, then husband
Viera Součková	Kveta, Jolana's friend
Zita Furková (b. 1940)	Kveta, Jolana's friend (voice)
Ján Žiga	Vojto, Irena's boyfriend, Jolana's suitor, then husband
Arpád Rigo	Dežo Daniel, Jolana's brother
Ivan Rajniak (1931–1999)	Dežo Daniel, Jolana's brother (voice)
Věra Bílá (b. 1954)	Gita, Jolana's sister
Verona Ferčáková	Phuri Daj (Grandmother), Jolana's grandmother
Margita Gašparová	Mrs. Danielová, Jolana's mother
Ján Giňa	Mr. Daniel, Jolana's father
Margita Miková	Mrs. Rigová, pregnant girl's mother
Marián Labuda (b. 1944)	Shop Floor Manager
Ľudovít Kroner (b. 1925)	Marcel, village fool
Jozef Kroner (1924–1998)	Marcel, village fool (voice)
Ondrej Redai	Mirga, Phuri Daj's hearse driver
Štefan Mandžár (b. 1952)	
Viera Kalejová	
Helena Demeterová	

The preponderance of dubbed roles was partly due to casting. Dušan Hanák wanted Rosy Dreams to feature little-seen and authentic actors. He turned to Czech actors to bring fresh faces to the Slovak silver screen, but out of those he cast, only Libuše Havelková and to some degree Václav Babka managed to speak the Slovak lines well enough not to require dubbing. Retaining the actors' voice proved almost impossible with the Romani characters. The otherwise adept Iva Bittová, a student at the music conservatory in Brno in Czech-speaking Moravia and daughter of a Moravian-Czech mother and a Romani father from the Galanta District in western Slovakia, had had little practical experience with Slovak and none with Romani, and the other Romani non-actors needed to be dubbed either for language issues, or because of their inexperience.

Among the few authentic voices that belonged to less experienced actors was the lead, Juraj Nvota, a student of theater directing at the University of Performing Arts in Bratislava. Sally Salingová had gained some performing experience as a singer with the then popular Braňo Hronec jazz band. Věra Bílá was born in the Czech Republic but her father, the musician Karol Giňa, and mother were born and grew up in eastern Slovakia (she herself moved there in 2005), which gave her experience with the language and her few Slovak and Romani lines were included. On the other hand, one of the film's most authentic-appearing characters, the granny Jakub feared dead, was actually played by the veteran actress Naďa Hejná from one of Slovakia's old, notable families who had a lifetime of amateur and professional experience on the stage in Martin.

Iva Bittová continued with her singing career, began to compose, and eventually saw her albums released in the United States. Another Romani non-actor, Věra Bílá, also embarked on an original singing career in the 1990s although she was singing in bands much earlier. Juraj Nvota followed Rosy Dreams with several more acting roles, started a varied career as a theater director, and began to direct films in the 1990s.

== Release dates ==
The authorities permitted Rosy Dreams to be distributed only in limited release. It received the Czechoslovak Critics' Award for 1996 and the Czech and Slovak Film Festival's Audience Award in Bratislava in 1977. It became the only Slovak film made in the 1970s that was shown abroad. Rosy Dreams has remained Dušan Hanák's most popular film. When it was released on VHS after the collapse of communism in Central Europe, it became a particular favorite with the Romani community in Slovakia and the Czech Republic.

Rosy Dreams was released on DVD in the PAL format, 4:3 aspect ratio, region-free ("Region 0") with English subtitles by SME/Slovenský filmový ústav in 2007.
