= Falkušovce =

Village and municipality in Slovakia

Falkušovce Falkus
- Municipality
- Flag

- Location of Falkušovce in the Košice Region Location of Falkušovce in Slovakia
- Coordinates: 48°37′46″N 21°50′43″E
- Country: Slovakia
- Region: Košice Region
- District: Michalovce District
- First mentioned: 1290

Area
  - Total: 9.46 km^{2} (3.65 sq mi)
- Elevation: 103 m (338 ft)

Population (2025)
  - Total: 665
- Time zone: UTC+1 (CET)
  - Summer (DST): UTC+2 (CEST)
- Postal code: 720 5
- Area code: +421 56
- Vehicle registration plate (until 2022): MI
- Website: www.obecfalkusovce.sk

Falkušovce (Hungarian: Falkus) is a village and municipality in Michalovce District in the Kosice Region of eastern Slovakia.

== History ==
In historical records the village was first mentioned in 1290. Before the establishment of independent Czechoslovakia in 1918, it was part of Zemplén County within the Kingdom of Hungary.

== Geography ==
The municipality lies at an altitude of 103 metres (338 ft) and covers an area of 9.46 km^{2} (3.65 sq mi) (2025).

== Population ==
Population statistic (10 years)
Year	1995	2005	2015	2025
Count	622	687	665	665
Difference		+10.45%	−3.20%	+0%

Population statistic
Year	2024	2025
Count	659	665
Difference		+0.91%

It has a population of 665 people (31 December 2025).

=== Ethnicity ===
Census 2021 (1+ %)
Ethnicity	Number	Fraction
Slovak	607	91.69%
Romani	36	5.43%
Not found out	28	4.22%
Rusyn	17	2.56%
Ukrainian	8	1.2%
Total	662	

In year 2021 was 662 people by ethnicity 607 as Slovak, 36 as Romani, 28 as Not found out, 17 as Rusyn, 8 as Ukrainian, 5 as Czech and 1 as Hungarian.

Note on population: The difference values of population numbers in the table "Population statistic" and in the sections "Ethnicity" & "Religion" is caused by the use of various statistical methods.

=== Religion ===
Census 2021 (1+ %)
Religion	Number	Fraction
Eastern Orthodox Church	188	28.4%
Greek Catholic Church	170	25.68%
Roman Catholic Church	157	23.72%
None	52	7.85%
Not found out	49	7.4%
Calvinist Church	13	1.96%
Evangelical Church	11	1.66%
Jehovah's Witnesses	9	1.36%
Total	662	

In year 2021 was 662 people by religion 188 from Eastern Orthodox Church, 170 from Greek Catholic Church, 157 from Roman Catholic Church, 52 from None, 49 from Not found out, 13 from Calvinist Church, 11 from Evangelical Church, 9 from Jehovah's Witnesses, 5 from Church of the Brethren, 4 from Christian Congregations in Slovakia, 1 from Paganism and natural spirituality, 1 from Other and not ascertained christian church, 1 from Other and 1 from Baptists Church.

== Government ==
The village relies on the tax and district offices, and fire brigade at Michalovce and the police force at Trhovište.

== Culture ==
The village had a small public library, a post office, and to this day has some food stores.

== Sports ==
The village has a football pitch.

== Transport ==
The nearest railway station is 6 kilometres away.

== Genealogical resources ==
The records for genealogical research are available at the state archive "Statny Archiv in Presov, Slovakia"

- Roman Catholic church records (births/marriages/deaths): 1788-1897 (parish B)
- Greek Catholic church records (births/marriages/deaths): 1786-1922 (parish A)
- Reformated church records (births/marriages/deaths): 1761-1896 (parish B)

== See also ==
- List of municipalities and towns in Slovakia
