= I Love, You Love =

I Love, You Love may refer to:

- I Love, You Love (1961 film), a documentary film
- I Love, You Love (1989 film), a Czechoslovak film
