= Pestalozzi's Mountain =

1989 film

- Film poster
- Directed by: Peter von Gunten
- Written by: Lukas Hartmann; Peter Schneider; Peter von Gunten
- Based on: Pestalozzis Berg by Lukas Hartmann
- Starring: Gian Maria Volonté
- Cinematography: Jürgen Lenz
- Edited by: Lotti Mehnert
- Music by: Heinz Reber
- Release date: 15 February 1989
- Running time: 119 minutes
- Countries: Switzerland; West Germany; Italy; East Germany
- Language: German

Pestalozzi's Mountain (German: Pestalozzis Berg) is a 1989 drama film directed by Peter von Gunten. It is based on Lukas Hartmann’s novel Pestalozzis Berg and stars Gian Maria Volonté as the Swiss educator Johann Heinrich Pestalozzi. The film focuses on a period of crisis in Pestalozzi’s life following the failure of his educational experiment and premiered in competition at the 39th Berlin International Film Festival.

== Synopsis ==
After the failure of his school for the poor, Johann Heinrich Pestalozzi retreats to a spa resort, where he reflects on his work and seeks a new beginning. The film revisits his failed educational experiment and his efforts to put his ideas into practice despite official opposition. It centres on Pestalozzi’s stay at Gurnigel after the collapse of his experiment at Stans, rather than attempting a full account of his life. At Gurnigel, Pestalozzi is alienated from those around him, but finds encouragement through his contact with Mädi.

== Cast ==
The cast includes:

- Gian Maria Volonté as Pestalozzi
- Rolf Hoppe as Zehender
- Heidi Züger as Mädi
- Christian Grashof as Zschokke
- Michael Gwisdek as Perrault

== Production ==
The film was a co-production between East Germany and Switzerland.

== Release and reception ==
The film premiered in competition at the 39th Berlin International Film Festival on 15 February 1989 and was shown in East Germany on 16 March 1989.

=== Critical response ===
According to Der Spiegel, critical response to the film was divided, with the Neue Zürcher Zeitung praising it as a "notable attempt at a revival" and Der Tagesspiegel criticising its "narrowly limited and insufficiently probing view". In epd Film, it was described as one of the relatively rare DEFA co-productions with Western partners and as offering little new insight into Pestalozzi as a reformer.
