= Sochan (disambiguation) =

Sochan is the surname of Jeremy Sochan (born 2003), Polish-American basketball player.

Sochan may also refer to:

- Sochan (surname), a Polish surname
- Pavol Socháň (1862–1941), Slovak photographer, ethnographer, writer and artist
- Sochan, a common name for Rudbeckia laciniata
