= Žbince =

Žbince Nagycseb
- Municipality
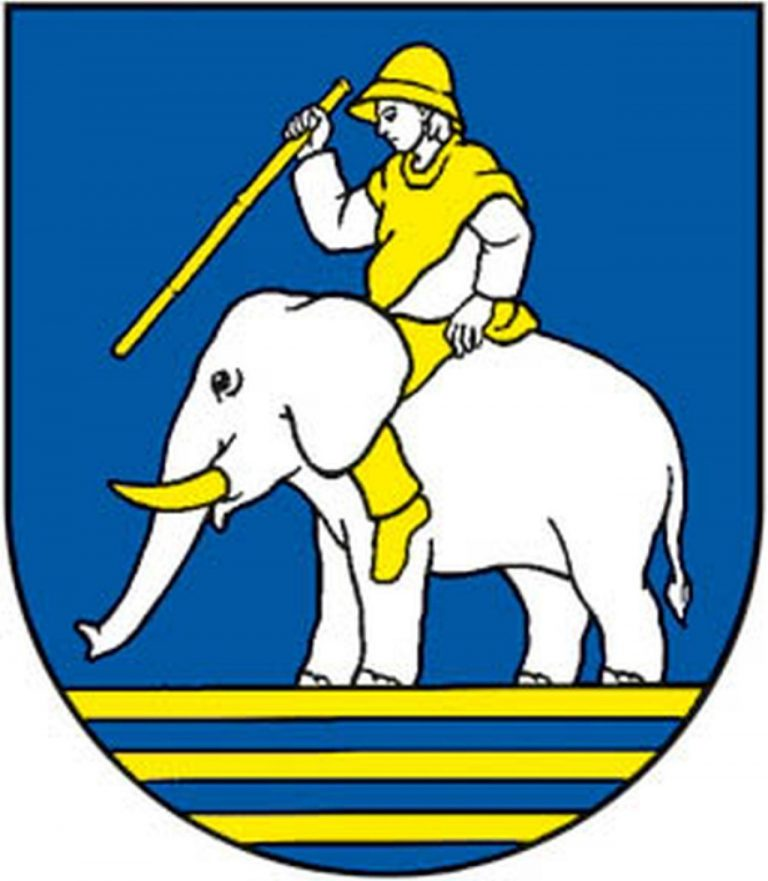
- Flag Coat of arms

- Location of Žbince in the Košice Region Location of Žbince in Slovakia
- Coordinates: 48.67°N 21.88°E
- Country: Slovakia
- Region: Košice Region
- District: Michalovce District
- First mentioned: 1221

Area
  - Total: 15.06 km^{2} (5.81 sq mi)
- Elevation: 104 m (341 ft)

Population (2025)
  - Total: 994
- Time zone: UTC+1 (CET)
  - Summer (DST): UTC+2 (CEST)
- Postal code: 721 6
- Area code: +421 56
- Vehicle registration plate (until 2022): MI
- Website: www.zbince.sk

Žbince (Hungarian: Nagycseb) is a village and municipality.in Michalovce District in the Kosice Region of eastern Slovakia, at an altitude of 106 metres (348 ft) and covers an area of 15.069 square kilometres (5.818 mi^{2}). It has a population of about 950.

== Geography ==
The municipality lies at an altitude of 104 metres (341 ft) and covers an area of 15.06 km^{2} (5.81 sq mi) (2025).

== History ==
In historical records the village was first mentioned in 1221.

== Population ==
Population statistic (10 years)
Year	1995	2005	2015	2025
Count	880	949	971	994
Difference		+7.84%	+2.31%	+2.36%

Population statistic
Year	2024	2025
Count	987	994
Difference		+0.70%

It has a population of 994 people (31 December 2025).

=== Ethnicity ===
Census 2021 (1+ %)
Ethnicity	Number	Fraction
Slovak	926	90.6%
Not found out	56	5.47%
Romani	45	4.4%
Total	1022	

In year 2021 was 1022 people by ethnicity 926 as Slovak, 56 as Not found out, 45 as Romani, 10 as Czech, 7 as Ukrainian, 5 as Hungarian and 1 as Romanian.

Note on population: The difference values of population numbers in the table "Population statistic" and in the sections "Ethnicity" & "Religion" is caused by the use of various statistical methods.

=== Religion ===
Census 2021 (1+ %)
Religion	Number	Fraction
Roman Catholic Church	652	63.8%
Greek Catholic Church	162	15.85%
None	136	13.31%
Not found out	50	4.89%
Total	1022	

In year 2021 was 1022 people by religion 652 from Roman Catholic Church, 162 from Greek Catholic Church, 136 from None, 50 from Not found out, 8 from Eastern Orthodox Church, 5 from Evangelical Church, 3 from Calvinist Church, 2 from Jehovah's Witnesses, 1 from Old Catholic Church, 1 from Other and not ascertained christian church, 1 from Christian Congregations in Slovakia and 1 from Ad hoc movements.

== Buildings and infrastructure ==
The village has a church, St Anna's Church, which was built in 1323 along with a small public library, a gymnasium and a football pitch; but the nearest railway station is in the adjacent village Hatalov.

== Gallery ==
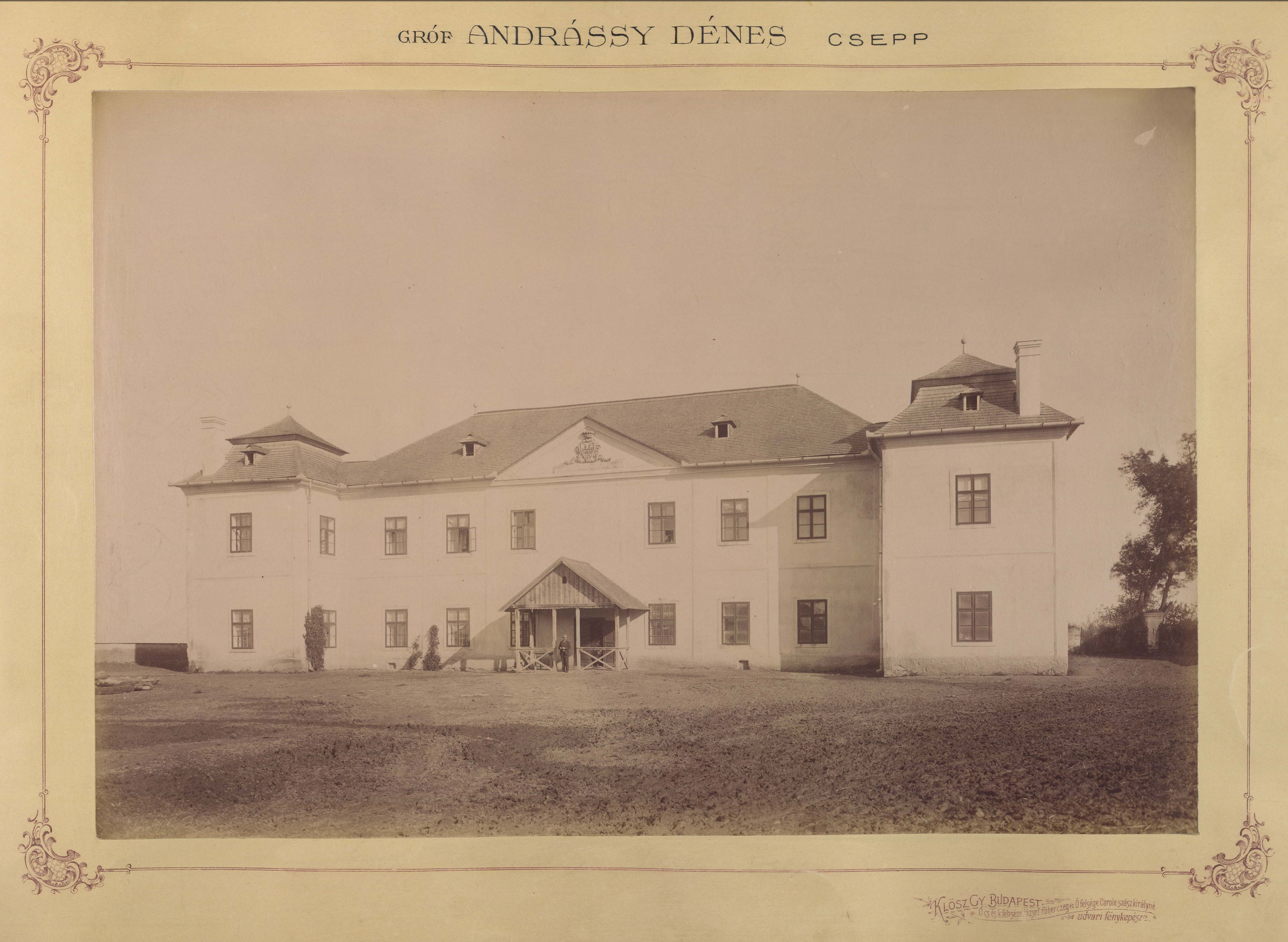
The defunct Barkóczy manor house in Žbince, built in the 1890s

== See also ==
- List of municipalities and towns in Michalovce District
- List of municipalities and towns in Slovakia
