= Naďa Hejná =

Slovak actress (1906–1994)

- Born: Naďa Pietrová; 8 February 1906; Turócszentmárton, Austria-Hungary
- Died: 6 October 1994 (aged 88); Štiavnička, Slovakia
- Years active: 1944–1990
- Spouse: Vít Hejný
- Children: Milan Hejný

Naďa Hejná (née Pietrová; 6 October 1906 – 8 February 1994) was a Slovak actress.

== Biography ==
=== Early life and education ===
Naďa Hejná was born in Turócszentmárton, Kingdom of Hungary, Austria-Hungary (now Martin, Slovakia) to a locally prominent family belonging to petty nobility. Her grandfather Ambro Pietor and father Miloš Pietor were prominent journalists. Both of her parents were amateur actors. Her brother Ivan Pietor served as a Commerce and Transportation minister between 1945 and 1948. She studied commerce in Prague for a year, but abandoned her studied due to financial constrains and also to pursue acting. Following her return to Martin, she played with various amateur troupes and worked in theatre administration. In January 1944, she became an actress of the newly formed Slovenské komorné divadlo in Martin.

=== Fight against fascism ===
Upon the outbreak of the Slovak National Uprising, Hejná applied to join the Front Theatre, a troupe established by the actor Andrej Bagar with the aim to increase the morale of the rebels and to promote the antifascist resistance among population. Nonetheless, she was not accepted as it was considered too dangerous for a woman. Instead, she worked as a host of the rebel radio in Banská Bystrica.

=== After the war ===
From 1945 to 1948, Hejná lived in Prague again for family reasons – her brother was a minister and her husband had a job in the film industry. Following the 1948 Czechoslovak coup d'état, the family faced persecution. Hejná with her husband had to leave Prague and settled in a village of Štiavnička, nearby Martin. There, she returned to acting at the Martin theatre, where she remained active until 1990.

In addition to stage acting, Hejná appeared in a number of films, including Marketa Lazarová (1967), Rosy Dreams (1977) and Forget Mozart (1985).

== Death and legacy ==
Hejná died in Štiavnička on 8 February 1994 at the age of 88. She is buried at her family tomb at the National Cemetery in Martin. A street in Martin is named after her. The Radio and Television of Slovakia created a documentary about her life.

== Personal life ==
In 1930 she married a Czech professor Vít Hejný. Their son was the mathematician Milan Hejný.
