= Sochan (surname) =

Sochan is a Polish surname. Notable people with the surname include:

== People ==
- Jeremy Sochan (born 2003), Polish-American basketball player
- Zygmunt Sochan (1909–1998), Polish footballer and World War II resistance fighter

== See also ==
- Sochan (disambiguation)
- Pavol Socháň (1862–1941), Slovak photographer, ethnographer, writer and artist
