= Alexander Strelinger =

Slovak cinematographer (1934–2022)

Alexander Strelinger (10 September 1934 – 10 July 2022) was a Slovak cinematographer and photographer. He was born in Martin, Slovakia. After graduating from the Film and TV School of the Academy of Performing Arts in Prague in 1960, he became a cinematographer for documentary films in Bratislava, working most notably on the films Človek a hra (1969), Ľudovít Fulla (1972), Terchovská muzika (1984), and Pavol Socháň (1987) with Martin Slivka, the films Nemecká (1974) and Len lístok poľnej pošty (1977) with Peter Solan, the films Analógie (1965), Impresia (1966), and Variácie kľudu (1966) with Dušan Hanák, and the films Slovenský raj (1966), Črty z Indie (1967), Hr. Peklo (1967), and Mimoriadne cvičenie (1971) with Vladimir Kubenko. He was awarded a lifetime achievement award at the Kamera Awards in 2008. He also taught documentary filmmaking at the Academy of Performing Arts in Bratislava for several years before his death in Prague in 2022.
