= Zdena Studenková =

Slovak actress, singer, and writer

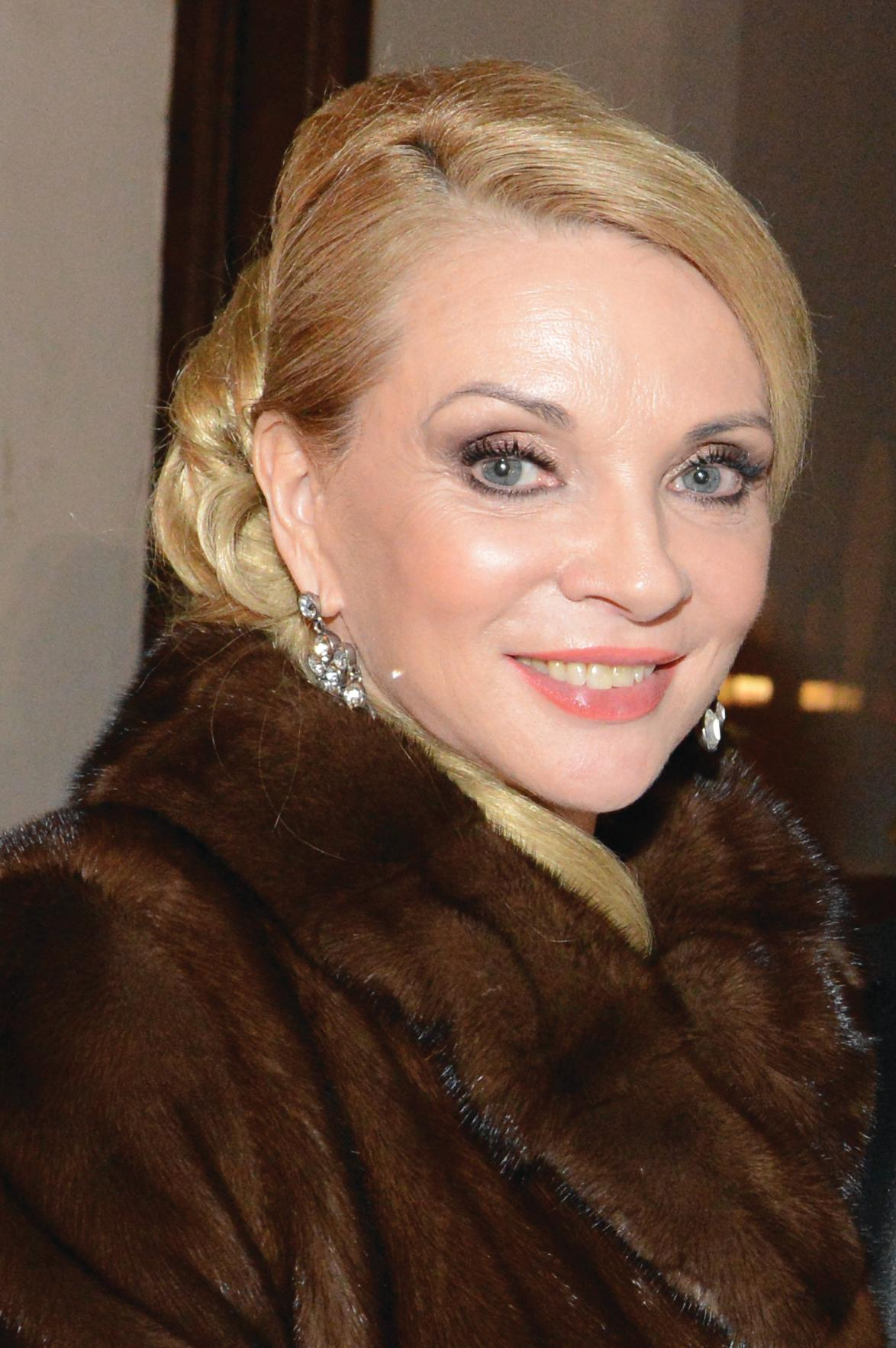
- Zdena Studenkova - PLASTIKA (2013)
- Born: May 19, 1954 (age 72); Bratislava, Czechoslovakia
- Education: SŠUP, Bratislava (1969–73) VŠMU, Bratislava (1973–77)
- Occupations: Actor; singer; writer; television presenter
- Years active: 1972–present
- Employer(s): NS (1977–78), (1994–96); SND (1978–94), (1996–99), (2005–2022)
- Spouse(s): Ivan Kostroň (photographer); Stanislav Párnický (director)
- Partner: Branislav Kostka
- Children: Simona Párnická
- Website: Slovak National Theater

Signature
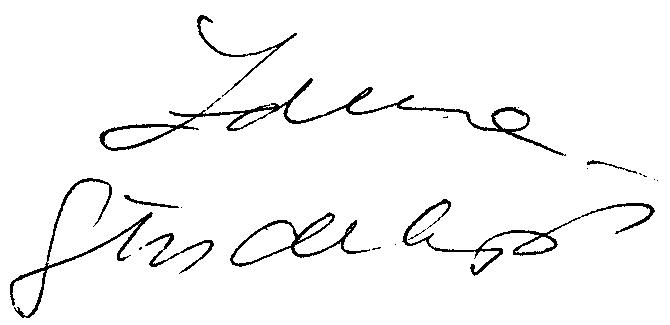

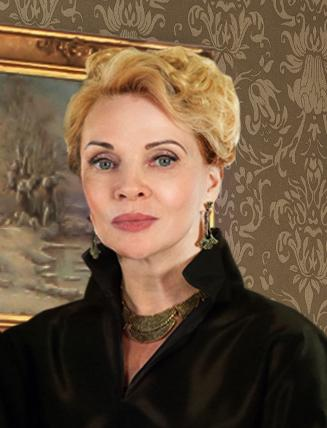
Studenková co-starred as Božena Škvorová in the Czech TV series The First Republic (2014).

Zdena Studenková (born May 19, 1954) is a Slovak film and stage actress, and a musical theater singer. She is the holder of the most number of OTO Awards, having won eight times in total.

In addition to performing arts, Studenková is an occasional host and author of literature with four published works, such as two cookbooks and a book featuring her interviews. In 2011, she released a picture book, Moji miláčikovia, for children.

== Selected filmography ==
- 1975: Kean (TV)
- 1978: Women's Gossip (TV)
- 1978: Panna a netvor
- 1979: Ruy Blas (TV)
- 1979: Life Is a Dream (TV)
- 1979: Eugene Onegin (TV)
- 1979: Cousin Bette (TV, series)
- 1981: The Misanthrope (TV)
- 1981: Rembrandt van Rijn (TV, series)
- 1981: Mojmir II (TV)
- 1982: I Enjoy the World With You
- 1982: Clavigo (TV)
- 1983: Angel in a Devil's Body
- 1986: Don Carlos (TV, series)
- 1987: The Miser (theater)
- 1988: Miss Julie (theater)
- 1990: Sleeping Beauty
- 1993: Everything I Like
- 1998: Lady Chatterley's Lover (TV)
- 2003: It Will Stay Between Us

== Bibliography ==
=== Cookbooks ===
- 2004: Recepty so štipkou hereckého korenia, IKAR
- 2005: Nové recepty so štipkou hereckého korenia, IKAR

=== Other releases ===
- 2006: Som herečka: Rozhovory s Jánom Štrasserom with Ján Štrasser, FORZA Music
- 2011: Moji miláčikovia (picture book including CD Fragile deťom), IKAR. Illustrated by Dušan Pupala

== Discography ==
- 1995: Dotyky noci, ENA Records

== Awards ==
Year	Nominated work(s)	Award	Category	Result
People's Choice polls
1998	Herself	Slávik Awards	Singer	#21
1999	Herself	Slávik Awards	Singer	#24
2000	Herself	Slávik Awards	Singer	#17
2000	Herself	OTO Awards	TV Actress	Won
2001	Herself	OTO Awards	TV Actress	Won
2001	Herself	Slávik Awards	Singer	#25
2002	Herself	Slávik Awards	Singer	#29
2002	Herself	OTO Awards	TV Actress	Won
2003	Herself	OTO Awards	TV Actress	Won
2003	Herself	OTO Awards	Absolute OTO	Won
2003	Herself	Slávik Awards	Singer	#27
2004	Herself	Slávik Awards	Singer	#31
2004	Herself	OTO Awards	Absolute OTO	Won
2004	Herself	OTO Awards	TV Actress	Won
2005	Herself	OTO Awards	TV Actress	Won
2005	Herself	Slávik Awards	Singer	#45
Other awards	Herself			
2007	Communism (by V. Klimáček) as Ona	LitFond Awards	Theater	Yes
2008	Hamlet as Gertrude	LitFond Awards	Theater	Yes
2008	Female Fetishists (by I. Horváthová) as Maryla	LitFond Awards	Theater	Yes
2008	Dinner as Paige	LitFond Awards	Theater	Yes
2008	Herself	Bratislava – New Town Award	Lifetime achievement	Yes
2009	The Prisoner of Second Avenue as Mimi	LitFond Rewards	Theater	Yes
2011	The Seagull as Irina Nikolayevna	LitFond Awards	Theater	Yes
2014	Leni (by V. Schulczová & R. Olekšák) as Leni	Dosky Awards	Best Female Actor	Won

== Controversies ==
In 2009, after being asked in an interview with Czech magazine Reflex why she refers to Romani people as "gypsies", which is considered to be a racial slur, Studenková opined that "90 percent of gypsies are social trash" and explained that she doesn't see a reason to be considerate of people that "basically refuse to be educated and to work, and ignore basic hygiene habits". She added that her views on the Roma community are rooted in her childhood, detailing an experience from elementary school when she had to sit next to a Roma girl with lice. Her comments were met with a wave of criticism in both Czechia and Slovakia for being racist and anti-roma, and were publicly condemned by personalities like Ernest Sarközi, artistic director of the Gypsy Devils orchestra, or Roman Kaiser, president of the European Roma Employment Agency, who called her statements "highly inappropriate".

Studenková doubled down on her negative comments regarding the Roma in 2012, after the Krásna Hôrka Castle was destroyed in a fire caused by two young Roma boys who attempted to light a cigarette and accidentally set dry grass around the castle on fire. In an interview with Život magazine, Studenková asserted that "the Roma question" would be solved if the same laws applied to both white and Romani people, before continuing: "How come they burned down Krásna Hôrka and you see none of them there ? Why didn't march there the whole village of those who have nothing to do and don't work eight hours a day, and then: You want social benefits ? Did you work for it ? Here you go ! They burned down a historic landmark of incalculable value, brats ! Fuckers are destroying our property, how come they're invincible ?" She also criticized the Christian Democratic Movement (KDH) party's pro-life politics in the same interview, saying "why don't each of them have ten gypsy children adopted ?".

In 2011, Studenková criticized the success of Turkish soap opera Binbir Gece in Slovakia, stating "I don't know if anybody realizes this, but this is another way we let the muslim world into our homes. In Arab states, they would never broadcast our soap operas". Her comments were branded islamophobic and racist by media.
