= Hatalov =

Village and municipality in Slovakia

Hatalov Gatály
- Municipality
- Flag

- Location of Hatalov in the Košice Region Location of Hatalov in Slovakia
- Coordinates: 48.67°N 21.88°E
- Country: Slovakia
- Region: Košice Region
- District: Michalovce District
- First mentioned: 1278

Area
  - Total: 8.63 km^{2} (3.33 sq mi)
- Elevation: 104 m (341 ft)

Population (2025)
  - Total: 730
- Time zone: UTC+1 (CET)
  - Summer (DST): UTC+2 (CEST)
- Postal code: 721 6
- Area code: +421 56
- Vehicle registration plate (until 2022): MI
- Website: www.hatalov.sk

Hatalov (Hungarian: Gatály) is a village and municipality in Michalovce District in the Kosice Region of eastern Slovakia.

== History ==
In historical records the village was first mentioned in 1278. Before the establishment of independent Czechoslovakia in 1918, it was part of Zemplén County within the Kingdom of Hungary.

== Geography ==
The municipality lies at an altitude of 104 metres (341 ft) and covers an area of 8.63 km^{2} (3.33 sq mi) (2025).

== Population ==
Population statistic (10 years)
Year	1995	2005	2015	2025
Count	804	753	758	730
Difference		−6.34%	+0.66%	−3.69%

Population statistic
Year	2024	2025
Count	730	730
Difference		+0%

It has a population of 730 people (31 December 2025).

=== Ethnicity ===
Census 2021 (1+ %)
Ethnicity	Number	Fraction
Slovak	692	94.66%
Romani	27	3.69%
Not found out	14	1.91%
Rusyn	9	1.23%
Total	731	

In year 2021 was 731 people by ethnicity 692 as Slovak, 27 as Romani, 14 as Not found out, 9 as Rusyn, 4 as Hungarian, 2 as Ukrainian, 2 as French and 1 as Czech.

Note on population: The difference values of population numbers in the table "Population statistic" and in the sections "Ethnicity" & "Religion" is caused by the use of various statistical methods.

=== Religion ===
Census 2021 (1+ %)
Religion	Number	Fraction
Roman Catholic Church	479	65.53%
Greek Catholic Church	165	22.57%
None	32	4.38%
Not found out	21	2.87%
Eastern Orthodox Church	12	1.64%
Total	731	

In year 2021 was 731 people by religion 479 from Roman Catholic Church, 165 from Greek Catholic Church, 32 from None, 21 from Not found out, 12 from Eastern Orthodox Church, 6 from Other and not ascertained christian church, 6 from Evangelical Church, 5 from Calvinist Church, 3 from Other, 1 from Jehovah's Witnesses and 1 from Ad hoc movements.

== Government ==
The village relies on the tax and district offices, and fire brigade at Michalovce and the police force at Trhovište.

== Genealogical resources ==
The records for genealogical research are available at the state archive "Statny Archiv in Presov, Slovakia"

- Roman Catholic church records (births/marriages/deaths): 1789-1906 (parish B)
- Greek Catholic church records (births/marriages/deaths): 1756-1904 (parish B)

== See also ==
- List of municipalities and towns in Slovakia
