= Peter von Gunten =

Swiss film director (born 1941)

- Born: 1941 (age 84–85); Bern, Switzerland
- Occupations: Film director Cinematographer; Screenwriter
- Years active: 1971–2005

Peter von Gunten (born 1941) is a Swiss film director, cinematographer and screenwriter. He directed eleven films between 1971 and 2005. His 1989 film Pestalozzi's Mountain was entered into the 39th Berlin International Film Festival.

== Selected filmography ==
- Pestalozzi's Mountain (1989)
