= Gypsy Devils =

Slovak orchestra

- Origin: Slovakia
- Genres: Classical, gypsy music, jazz, ethno, music fusions
- Years active: 2007–present
- Members: Ernest Šarközi; Silvia Šarközi; Štefan Banyák; Emil Hasala; Zoltán Grunza; Jozef Farkaš; Robert Fehér
- Website: http://www.gypsydevils.com

Gypsy Devils (Slovak Cigánski diabli) is a Slovak Orchestra, which was founded in 2007 after breaking away from the group Diabolské husle. Classical music in their submission is enriched with elements of gypsy music, folk music, jazz, ethno, flamenco and more. They use their own unique arrangements and virtuosic elements.

Remelting different styles brought them success on concert stages in 35 countries on five continents.

They performed in the concert halls of the Berlin Philharmonic, Komische Oper Berlin, Konzerthaus Berlin, Royal Opera House in London, Hans Max Saal – Munich, Smetana Hall – Prague, Concert and Kongressaal – Luzern, Concert Hall – Melbourne, Goldener Saal Musikverein – Vienna, Is Sanat Hall – Istanbul, Palace of Culture – Novosibirsk, EXPO 2008 Zaragoza Expo 2010 Shanghai.

They represented Slovakia at the Olympics: the 2010 Winter Olympic Games and Summer Olympic Games 2012. They performed at music festivals Kissinger Sommer Bad Kissingen, Beethovenfest Bonn, Pärnu David Oistrakh Festival, Liszt Festival Raiding, Euroclassic Pirmasens, Jeju World Arts Festival "Prague Spring" Sziget fesztivál Budapest, Mondial des Cultures Drummondville, Khamoro Prague and the Festival de Martigues and cooperates with many leading orchestras, conductors, singers and instrumentalists from around the world. Gipsy Kings, Paul Gulda and the Vienna String Quartet, Chamber Philharmonic Bremen, the Moravian Philharmonic, Philharmonic B.Martinu Zlín, Slovak Radio Symphony Orchestra are just a few of them.

== Projects ==
- Gypsy-Baroque, unconventional version of songs from the Baroque to the present, cooperation with Barocco Sempre Giovane
- Gypsy Devils & the 100-member Hungarian Gypsy Orchestra Budapest
- Gypsy Devils & Katka Knechtová, concert tour – fusion of gypsy music, classical music, pop, folk and ethno
- Gypsy Devils & Rock music, fusion of ethno and rock music, in cooperation with Slovak rock band Desmod
- Gypsy Devils & Symphony orchestras: Chamber Philharmonic Bremen, Symphony Orchestra Athens, Symphony Orchestra Nicozia
- Gypsy Devils & Paul Gulda, concerts Liszt-Roma Rhapsodie a Haydn a la Zingarese, fusion with Austrian piano virtuoso Paul Gulda
- Gypsy Devils & Jaroslav Svěcený, fusion with the Czech violin virtuoso
- Gypsy Devils & Lucie Bílá, unconventional fusion with multi-genre Czech singer
- Gypsy Devils & Totti Ovidiu, music-dance show: Gypsy Devils & dancers from Cirque du Soleil

== Members ==
Ernest Šarközi – arrangements and cymbalo, Silvia Šarközi – cello and solo singing, Štefan Banyák – 1st violin, Emil Hasala – 2nd violin and lyrics, Zoltán Grunza – clarinet and tarogato, Jozef Farkaš – manager and viola, Robert Fehér – doublebass
