= Adolf Hauser =

Swiss hotelier and politician

- Born: 8 February 1831; Wädenswil, Switzerland
- Died: 31 January 1892 (aged 60); Lucerne, Switzerland
- Occupations: Hotelier, politician
- Spouse: Emma Späth (m. 1861)
- Parent(s): Hans Kaspar Hauser; Susanna Höhn
- Relatives: Johann Jakob Hauser (brother)

Adolf Hauser (8 February 1831 – 31 January 1892) was a Swiss hotelier and politician. He owned the largest private hotel property in Switzerland and was the first Protestant member of the Grand Council of Lucerne.

== Early life and career ==
Hauser was born on 8 February 1831 in Wädenswil, the son of Hans Kaspar Hauser, an innkeeper, and Susanna Höhn. He was the brother of Johann Jakob Hauser. He completed various internships in hotels in Bad Ragaz, London, and Italy. In 1861, he married Emma Späth of St. Gallen.

== Hotel business ==
In 1861, Hauser and his brothers Gottfried (died 1866) and Albert (died 1877) purchased the Schweizerhof in Lucerne. In 1872, they acquired the Luzernerhof. With 600 beds, these two establishments represented the largest private hotel property in Switzerland.

== Political career ==
Hauser was a member of the Radical party. He served on the Grand Council of the city of Lucerne from 1878 to 1892. In 1891, he became the first Protestant deputy elected to the Grand Council of Lucerne, serving until his death in 1892. He was president of the Swiss Hotel Association (Société suisse des hôteliers) from 1889 to 1892.

Hauser died on 31 January 1892 in Lucerne.

== Bibliography ==
- R. Bussmann, Luzerner Grossratsbiographien, StALU
