= 39th Berlin International Film Festival =

1989 film festival in West Berlin, Germany

- Festival poster
- Location: West Berlin, Germany
- Founded: 1951
- Awards: Golden Bear: Rain Man
- No. of films: 375 films
- Festival date: 10 – 21 February 1989
- Website: http://www.berlinale.de

Berlin International Film Festival chronology
- 40th 38th

The 39th annual Berlin International Film Festival was held from 10 to 21 February 1989.

The Golden Bear was awarded to American film Rain Man directed by Barry Levinson.

The retrospective was dedicated to German film producer Erich Pommer and another one dedicated to European productions of 1939 titled Europe 1939.

== Jury ==
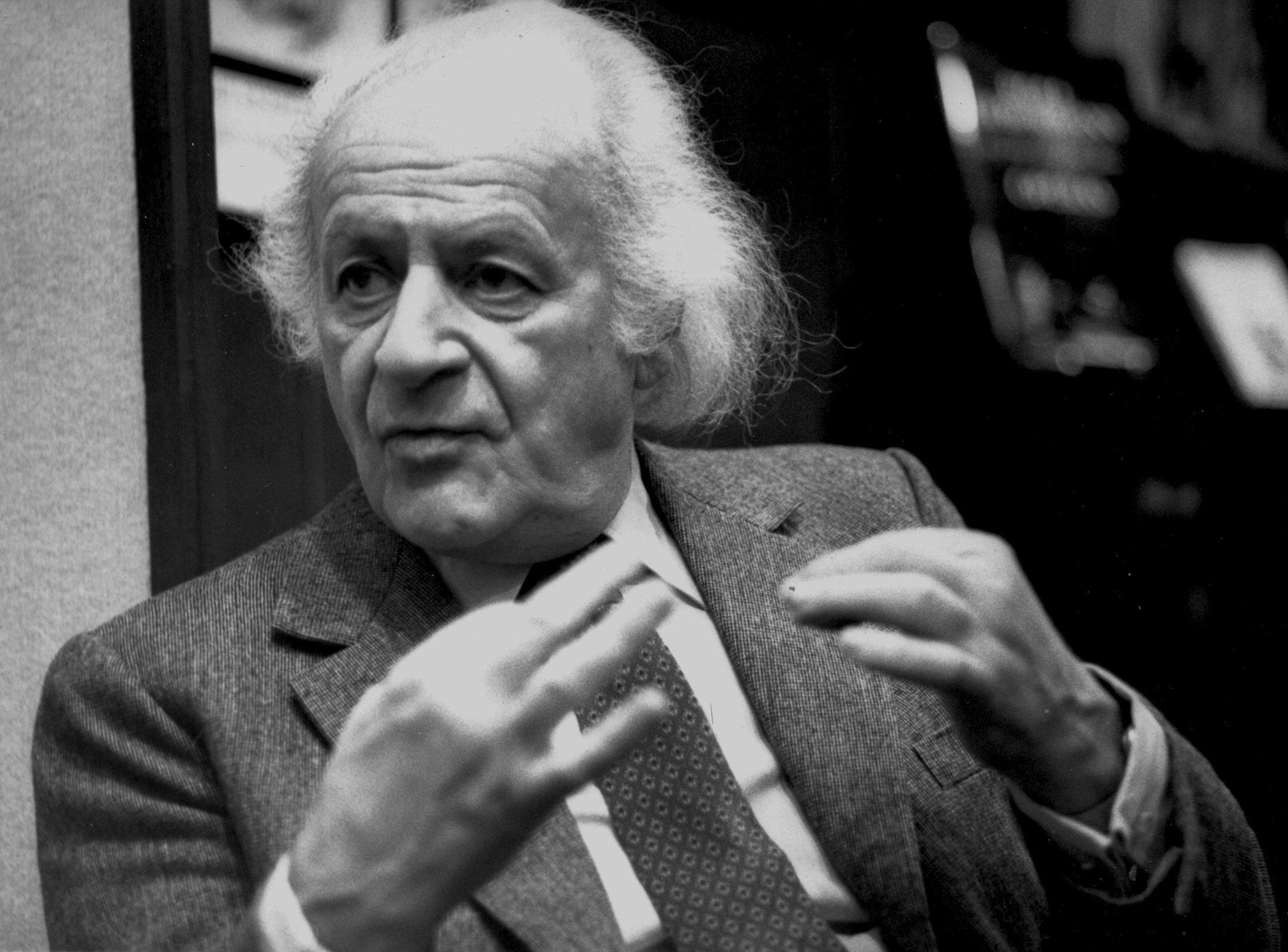
Rolf Liebermann, Jury President

The following people were announced as being on the jury for the festival:

- Rolf Liebermann, Swiss composer - Jury President
- Leslie Caron, French dancer and actress
- Chen Kaige, Chinese filmmaker
- Vadim Glowna, West-German actor and filmmaker
- Randa Haines, American filmmaker
- Vladimir Ignatovski, Bulgarian director of Bulgarska Nacionalna Filmoteka
- Adrian Kutter, West-German founder of the Biberach an der Riß Film Festival
- Francisco Rabal, Spanish actor
- Cliff Robertson, American actor
- Zdeněk Svěrák, Czech actor and screenwriter
- Boris Vasilyev, Soviet writer and screenwriter

== Official Sections ==
=== Main Competition ===
The following films were in competition for the Golden Bear and Silver Bear awards:

English title	Original title	Director(s)	Country
The Accused		Jonathan Kaplan	United States
American Stories: Food, Family and Philosophy	Histoires d'Amérique	Chantal Akerman	Belgium, France
Aviya's Summer	הקיץ של אביה	Eli Cohen	Israel
Bankomatt		Villi Hermann	Switzerland, Italy
Before the Bat's Flight Is Done	Mielött befejezi röptét a denevér	Péter Tímár	Hungary
Camille Claudel		Bruno Nuytten	France
The Dark Night	La noche oscura	Carlos Saura	Spain, France
Esquilache		Josefina Molina	Spain
Evening Bell	晚鐘	Wu Ziniu	China
Fallada: The Last Chapter	Fallada – letztes Kapitel	Roland Gräf	East Germany
Gang of Four	La bande des quatre	Jacques Rivette	France
Hope and Pain	ダウンタウン・ヒーローズ	Yoji Yamada	Japan
I Love, You Love	Ja milujem, ty miluješ	Dušan Hanák	Czechoslovakia
Ivan and Alexandra	Иван и Александра	Ivan Nitchev	Bulgaria
Joan of Arc of Mongolia	Johanna D'Arc of Mongolia	Ulrike Ottinger	West Germany, France
Mississippi Burning		Alan Parker	United States
Pestalozzi's Mountain	Pestalozzis Berg	Peter von Gunten	East Germany, Switzerland, Italy
Rain Man		Barry Levinson	United States
Resurrected		Paul Greengrass	United Kingdom
The Servant	Sluga	Vadim Abdrashitov	Soviet Union
The Striker with Number 9	Η φανέλα με το 9	Pantelis Voulgaris	Greece
Talk Radio		Oliver Stone	United States

=== Out of Competition ===
- Farewell to False Paradise (Abschied vom falschen Paradies), directed by Tevfik Başer (West Germany)
- Another Woman, directed by Woody Allen (USA)
- The Break, directed by Frank Beyer (East Germany)
- Dangerous Liaisons, directed by Stephen Frears (USA)
- C*A*S*H: A Political Fairy Tale, directed by Norbert Kückelmann (West Germany)
- Solovky Power (Власть Соловецкая. Свидетельства и документы), directed by Marina Goldovskaya (Soviet Union)
- War Requiem, directed by Derek Jarman (UK)

=== Retrospective ===
The following films were shown in the retrospective dedicated to Erich Pommer:

English title	Original title	Director(s)	Country
Asphalt		Joe May	Germany
A Waltz Dream	Ein Walzertraum	Ludwig Berger	Germany
Barbed Wire		Rowland V. Lee	United States
The Blackguard	Die Prinzessin und der Geiger	Graham Cutts	Germany, United Kingdom
The Blue Angel	Der blaue Engel	Josef von Sternberg	Germany
Bombs on Monte Carlo	Bomben auf Monte Carlo	Hanns Schwarz	United States
The Cabinet of Dr. Caligari	Das Cabinet des Dr. Caligari	Robert Wiene	Germany
Children, Mother, and the General	Kinder, Mütter und ein General	László Benedek	Germany
The Congress Dances	Der Kongreß tanzt	Erik Charell	Germany
Dance, Girl, Dance		Dorothy Arzner	United States
Dr. Mabuse the Gambler	Dr. Mabuse, der Spieler	Fritz Lang	Germany
The Empress and I	Ich und die Kaiserin	Friedrich Hollaender	Germany
Faust	Faust – Eine deutsche Volkssage	F. W. Murnau	Germany
Fire Over England		William K. Howard	United Kingdom
F.P.1 - Floating Platform 1 Does Not Answer	F.P.1 antwortet nicht	Karl Hartl	Germany
Homecoming	Heimkehr	Joe May	Germany
Hotel Imperial		Mauritz Stiller	United States
I by Day, You by Night	Ich bei Tag und du bei Nacht	Ludwig Berger	Germany
Illusion in a Minor Key	Illusion in Moll	Rudolf Jugert	West Germany
Inquest	Voruntersuchung	Robert Siodmak	Germany
Inquest	Zwei blaue Jungen	Alwin Neuß	Germany
Jamaica Inn		Alfred Hitchcock	United Kingdom
Liliom		Fritz Lang	France
The Man in Search of His Murderer	Der Mann, der seinen Mörder sucht	Robert Siodmak	Germany
Manon Lescaut		Arthur Robison	Germany
Metropolis		Fritz Lang	Germany
Michael		Carl Theodor Dreyer	Germany
Nights on the Road	Nachts auf den Straßen	Rudolf Jugert	Germany
Peter the Pirate	Pietro, der Korsar	Arthur Robison	Germany
Quick		Robert Siodmak	Germany
They Knew What They Wanted		Garson Kanin	United States
The Three from the Filling Station	Die Drei von der Tankstelle	Wilhelm Thiele	Germany
Variety	Varieté	E. A. Dupont	Germany
Vessel of Wrath		Erich Pommer	United Kingdom
The Wonderful Lies of Nina Petrovna		Hanns Schwarz	Germany

The following films were shown in the retrospective "Europe 1939":

English title	Original title	Director(s)	Country
A Girl Must Live		Carol Reed	United Kingdom
Bel Ami		Willi Forst	Germany
Boefje		Detlef Sierck	Netherlands
British Movietone of the 07/09/1939		(unknown)	United Kingdom
Cheer Boys Cheer		Walter Forde	United Kingdom
Crisis		Herbert Kline, Hanuš Burger and Alexander Hammid	United States
Constable Studer	Wachtmeister Studer	Leopold Lindtberg	Switzerland
The Deserter	Le Déserteur	Léonide Moguy	France
Daybreak	Le jour se lève	Marcel Carné	France
Deutsche Kulturfilme (beinhaltet Alpenkorps im Angriff von Gösta Nordhaus und Germanen gegen Pharaonen von Anton Kutter)		(unknown)	Germany
Do It Now		(unknown)	United Kingdom
Dora Nelson		Mario Soldati	Italy
The Fight Continues	Борьба продолжается	Vasily Zhuravlyov	Soviet Union
The First Days		Humphrey Jennings, Harry Watt and Pat Jackson	United Kingdom
Fric-Frac		Maurice Lehmann	France
The Four Feathers		Zoltan Korda	United Kingdom
Goodbye, Mr. Chips		Sam Wood	United Kingdom
Gorky 2: My Apprenticeship	V lyudyakh В людях	Mark Donskoy	Soviet Union
The Governor	Der Gouverneur	Victor Tourjansky	Germany
Hotel Sacher		Erich Engel	Germany
The Journey to Tilsit	Die Reise nach Tilsit	Veit Harlan	Germany
Kitty and the World Conference	Kitty und die Weltkonferenz	Helmut Käutner	Germany
Kriegsbeginn in der Wochenschau		Helmut Käutner	Germany
The Lion Has Wings		Michael Powell, Brian Desmond Hurst and Adrian Brunel	United Kingdom
Love On The Wing		Norman McLaren	United Kingdom
MFI 754/MFI 812 newsreels	MFI 754/MFI 812	(unknown)	Hungary
Midsummer Night's Fire	Johannisfeuer	Arthur Maria Rabenalt	Germany
The New Teacher	Учитель	Sergei Gerasimov	Soviet Union
The Oppenheim Family	Семья Оппенгейм	Grigori Roshal	Soviet Union
Pathé Journal 06/09/1939		(unknown)	France
Q Planes		Tim Whelan and Arthur B. Woods	United Kingdom
The Rules of the Game	La Règle du Jeu	Jean Renoir	France
Shchors	Щорс	Alexander Dovzhenko and Yuliya Solntseva	Soviet Union
Spain	Испания	Esfir Shub	Soviet Union
Spare Time		Humphrey Jennings	United Kingdom
The Spy in Black		Michael Powell	United Kingdom
There's No Tomorrow	Sans lendemain	Max Ophüls	France
They Knew What They Wanted		Garson Kanin	United States
They Staked Their Lives	Med livet som insats	Alf Sjöberg	Sweden
Threats	Menaces...	Edmond T. Gréville	France
Three Sergeants	Drei Unteroffiziere	Werner Hochbaum	Germany
Two Girls on the Street	Két lány az utcán	Andre DeToth	Hungary
Ufa Tonwoche 440 vom 9.2.1939		(unknown)	Germany
Ufa Tonwoche 468 vom 23.8.1939		(unknown)	Germany
Ufa Tonwoche 469 vom 30.8.1939		(unknown)	Germany
Ufa Tonwoche vom 7.9.1939		(unknown)	Germany
Uproar in Damascus	Aufruhr in Damaskus	Gustav Ucicky	Germany
The Vyborg Side	Выборгская сторона	Grigori Kozintsev and Leonid Trauberg	Soviet Union
War Library Items 1, 2, 3		(unknown)	United Kingdom
The West Wall	Der Westwall	Fritz Hippler	Germany

== Official Awards ==
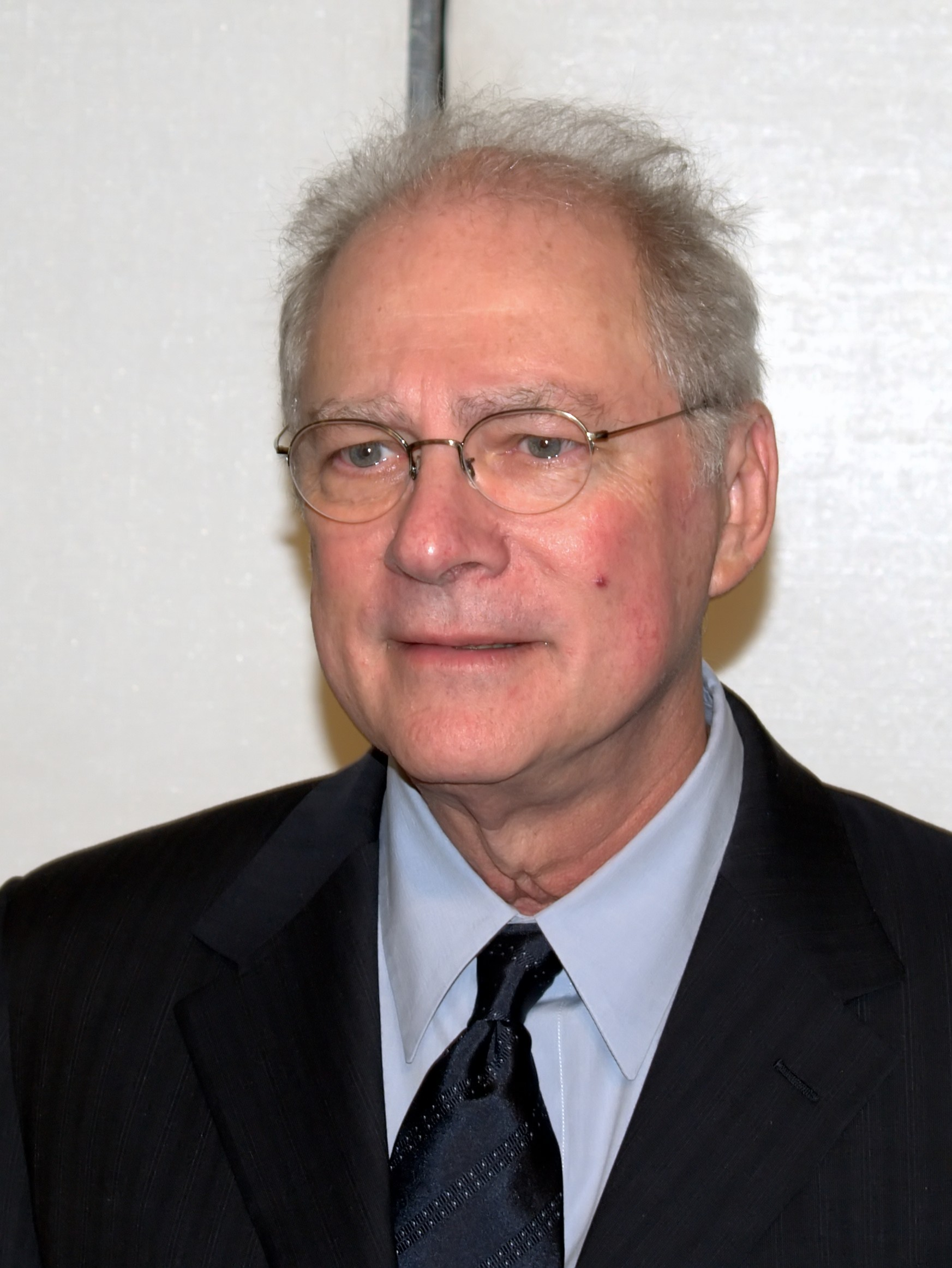
Barry Levinson, winner of the Golden Bear at the event

The following prizes were awarded by the Jury:

- Golden Bear: Rain Man by Barry Levinson
- Silver Bear – Special Jury Prize: Evening Bell by Wu Ziniu
- Silver Bear for Best Director: Dušan Hanák for I Love, You Love
- Silver Bear for Best Actress: Isabelle Adjani for Camille Claudel
- Silver Bear for Best Actor: Gene Hackman for Mississippi Burning
- Silver Bear for an outstanding single achievement: Eric Bogosian for Talk Radio
- Silver Bear for an outstanding artistic contribution: Kaipo Cohen and Gila Almagor for Aviya's Summer
- Honourable Mention: Gang of Four by Jacques Rivette
- Alfred-Bauer Prize: The Servant

== Independent Awards ==
=== FIPRESCI Award ===
- Gang of Four by Jacques Rivette

=== UNICEF Award ===
- Juliana by Chaski Group (Peru)
