= Johann Jakob Hauser =

Swiss hotelier and politician

- Born: 22 June 1828; Wädenswil, Switzerland
- Died: 8 February 1891 (aged 62); Coldirodi (near San Remo), Liguria, Italy
- Occupations: Hotelier, politician
- Known for: Developing the Gurnigel thermal baths
- Political party: Radical
- Spouse: Anna Esther Ühli (m. 1853)
- Parent: Hans Kaspar Hauser
- Relatives: Adolf Hauser (brother)

Johann Jakob Hauser (22 June 1828 – 8 February 1891) was a Swiss hotelier and politician. He transformed the Gurnigel thermal establishment into a world-renowned spa hotel and built a hotel empire spanning Switzerland and several European countries.

== Early life and career ==
Hauser was born on 22 June 1828 in Wädenswil, the son of Hans Kaspar Hauser, an innkeeper. He was the brother of Adolf Hauser. In 1853, he married Anna Esther Ühli, daughter of Kaspar.

After completing his schooling in Wädenswil, Hauser took over his father's inn, the Angel (Zum Engel), while also practicing agriculture. In 1868, he purchased the thermal establishment at Gurnigel and developed it into a world-renowned spa hotel.

== Business expansion ==
Under Hauser's direction, the family business expanded significantly to include the Weissenburg spa hotel, the Schweizerhof hotels in Bern and Lucerne, the hotels at Giessbach and Rigi-Scheidegg, as well as properties in Italy, France, and Germany.

== Political career ==
Hauser served as a member of the Grand Council of Bern from 1875 to 1891 and as a member of the National Council from 1881 to 1891. He was initially affiliated with the center and later joined the Radicals.

== Other activities ==
Hauser was a member of the executive committee of the Economic Society of Bern and founded the poorhouse of Riggisberg. He also contributed significantly to horse breeding in the region.

== Death ==
Hauser died on 8 February 1891 in Coldirodi, near San Remo in Liguria, Italy.

== Bibliography ==
- Gruner, L'Assemblée, vol. 1, p. 173
- F. Ammann, Genealogische Kartei dynastischer Hoteliers- und Gastwirte-Familien, 1977, notebook 6
