= St Anna's Church, Žbince =

Church in Žbince, Slovakia

Coordinates: 48°39′57″N 21°52′44″E

St Anna's Church, Žbince is a Roman Catholic church in Žbince, Slovakia.

== History ==
The first record of this parish was in the year 1323. The local church was consecrated to St Margita. In approximately 1335, a paid local priest, Pavol, donated one tenth of the revenue from his parishioners to a papal cashbox.

The church was located in Hamlet's Part, also sporadically called Kostolné Žbince. In the 17th century, church services were conducted by evangelical reformed preachers, likely those of evangelical Augsburg's religion. Žbince's parish belonged to the Slovak Calvinistic parishes in the Middle Zemplín.

In the beginning of the 17th century, priests returned, and the church was returned to Catholic control in the 18th century. Žbince and nearby areas belonged to the Budkovce parish. In 1788, Bishop Karol Asterházy established a parish in the village's local chapel. Košice's Bishop, Dr Ondrej Szabo, then set up a vicarage with subsidiaries in Hatalov, Vŕbnica and Šamudovce. A wooden house served as the rectory. The current stone rectory was built in 1810.

The original church was damaged extensively after it had been taken away from the Catholics. Only a small amount of masonry remained. Church services were temporarily held in the chapel “Bolestná Panna Mária” in Bárkoczyov's castle. The current church was named for the parents of the Virgin Mary, Saints Joachim and Anna. This church was built in 1843 in a neoclassical style. The tower of the church was rebuilt between 1878 and 1879 and repairs were made to the church in 1905, 1929, and in 1969.

The interior is vaulted with a Prussian arch, which reaches to the cornices of doubled pillars. In the western section is a stone choir. The main altar has a painting of Saints Joachim and Anna. This was painted by Karol Wolch in 1849. The pulpit, baptismal font and organ are from the time the church was originally built. The interior was repainted in 1927 and again in 2000.

The first parish priest was Fr Pavol (Paulus Sac. De Cheb), who served from 1332-37. From 1737 to 2007, there have been 24 priests. Fr Andrej Pulík served in rectory 43 years, from 1943 to 1986, when he died in Žbince. He is interred in the local cemetery.
