= Stanislav Párnický =

Slovak director (1945–2023)

- Born: 11 April 1945; Piešťany, Czechoslovakia
- Died: 31 March 2023 (aged 77); Bratislava, Slovakia
- Occupation: Director
- Years active: 1971–2016
- Spouse: Zdena Studenková
- Children: 4

Stanislav Párnický (11 April 1945 – 31 March 2023) was a Slovak film and theatre director, scriptwriter, actor and pedagogue.

== Biography ==
Párnický was born on 11 April 1945 in Piešťany. In 1967 he graduated from the Academy of Performing Arts in Bratislava in theatre directing. Following a short stint in the Slovak National Uprising theatre in Martin, he became a television movies and series director at the public broadcaster Slovenská televízia.

His television projects Straty a nálezy, An American Tragedy, Chlapec z majera, Najatý klaun, Zbožňovaná, Pasca, Cukor, Hĺbkový rekord či O mužoch, ženách a deťoch received wide popular and critical acclaim.

In 1985 he moved to the Koliba movie ateliers in Bratislava. There, he directed his most famous movies, including the Cart Full of Pain, The Southern Mail and ..crying for the Moon.

Párnický taught at the Academy of Performing Arts in Bratislava from 1977. In 1990, he co-founded the Faculty of Film and Television at the academy. Between 1999 and 2006 he served as the Dean of the Faculty.

In 2017 he received the prize of the Minister of Culture of the Slovak Republic for his long-term extremely significant directorial contribution to audiovisual art.

Párnický was married to the actress Zdena Studenková from 1979 to 1993. Together, they had one daughter. In addition, Parnický had two other children from another marriage and another child with the journalist Erika Vincoureková.

Párnický died in Bratislava on 31 March 2023, at the age of 77.
