= Gurnigelbad =

Historic spa hotel in Switzerland

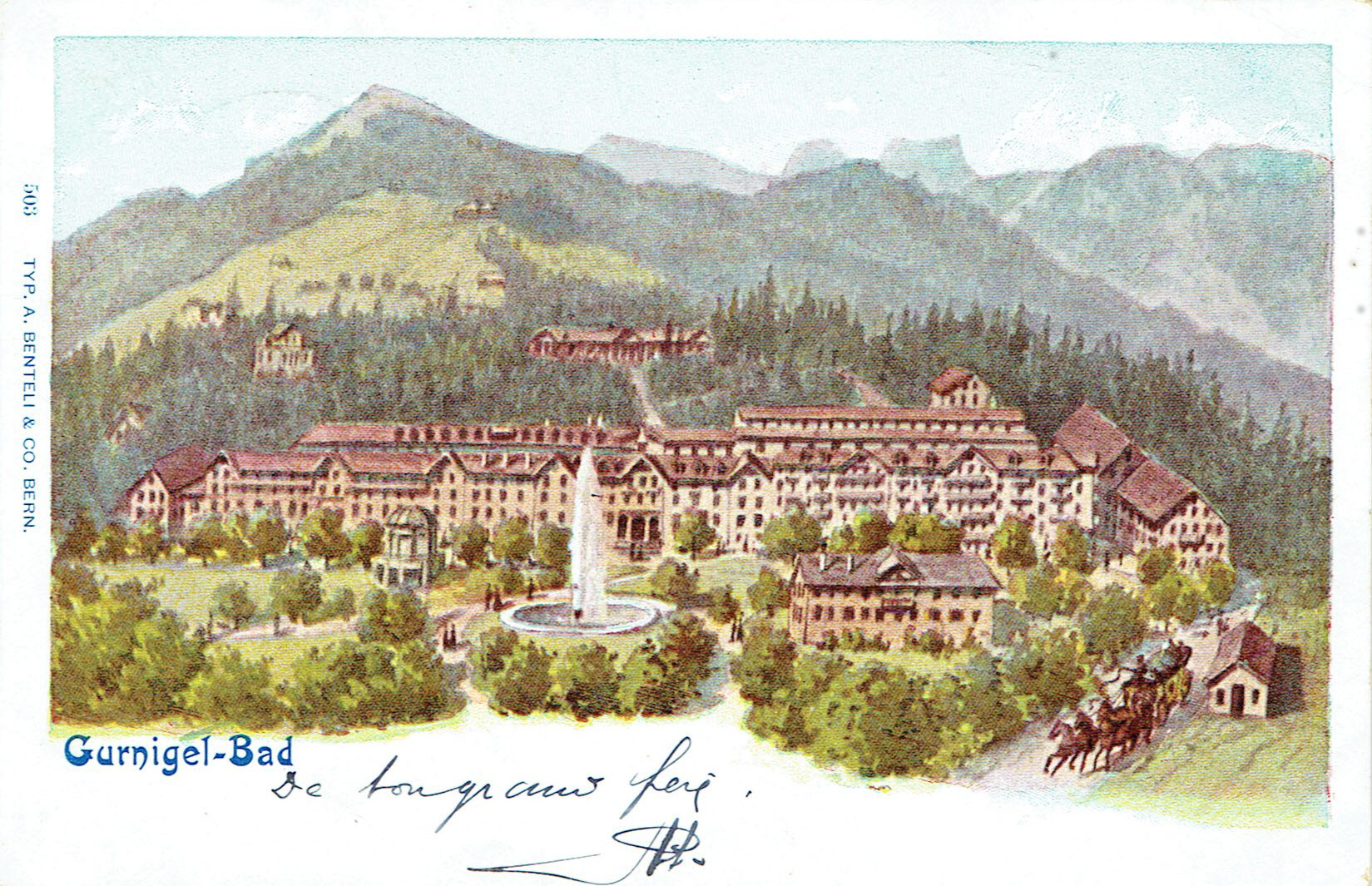
- The Gurnigelbad spa hotel around 1890

- Location within Switzerland

General information
- Type: Spa hotel
- Location: Riggisberg, Canton of Bern, Switzerland
- Coordinates: 46°44′N 7°28′E
- Current tenants: Asylum accommodation (2023–present, modern building)
- Completed: 16th century (baths), 19th century (grand hotel)
- Demolished: 1946
- Owner: Various (demolished 1946)

Gurnigelbad was a historic spa hotel complex in the municipality of Riggisberg in the Canton of Bern, Switzerland. Located in the Gantrisch region, the establishment centered around sulfurous thermal springs that were exploited from the 16th century onwards. During the 19th century, Gurnigelbad developed into one of Switzerland's largest and most renowned spa hotels, attracting wealthy clientele and notable Swiss figures before its decline and eventual demolition in the mid-20th century.

== History ==
=== Early development ===
The sulfurous springs at Gurnigel were noted for their supposed curative properties from the 16th century. A modest bathhouse was established early on to exploit these waters. The growing tourism industry of the 19th century transformed these humble beginnings into a luxury thermal hotel with national reputation.

=== Peak period ===
By the 19th century, Gurnigelbad had become one of the largest and most famous hotels in Switzerland. The establishment expanded rapidly from its origins as modest forest baths into a modern thermal hotel offering quality service. The clientele included aristocrats and wealthy individuals, as well as notable Swiss figures such as Albrecht von Haller, Johann Heinrich Pestalozzi, and Gottfried Keller.

The hotel offered first-class facilities including a billiard room, ladies' lounges, and an English garden with four fountains. For guests with smaller budgets, an alpine chalet with large dormitories containing 40 to 50 beds provided a more economical alternative. The establishment had its own covered shopping street protected from wind and weather.

The establishment was purchased by Johann Jakob Hauser in 1868.

=== Decline and destruction ===
In 1902, a major fire destroyed nearly all the buildings, marking the beginning of the end for the establishment's golden age. Although the hotel was rebuilt by 1905 with an impressive stone building the hotel struggled thereafter.

Multiple crises contributed to declining visitor numbers: World War I caused price increases for provisions, the Spanish flu pandemic of 1918–1920 halted tourist travel, and the effects of the Great Depression reached Europe in the 1930s. When World War II broke out in 1939, visitor numbers collapsed entirely.

The Pulver family, then owners of the property, ultimately sold the complex to the Swiss army, which made no use of it and demolished the main building by explosive in 1946. Only an outbuilding survived, which later housed a hotel-restaurant.

=== Modern era ===
The surviving outbuilding continued to operate as Hotel-Restaurant Gurnigelbad for many decades. In 2021, Bernese entrepreneur Hans-Ulrich Müller's Bernapark AG purchased the property with plans for renovation. However, the establishment closed in December 2022 due to economic difficulties.

In 2023, the building was converted to serve as collective accommodation for asylum seekers, with the Canton of Bern establishing up to 220 beds in the facility operated by the Swiss Red Cross.
