= Štiavnička =

- Municipality
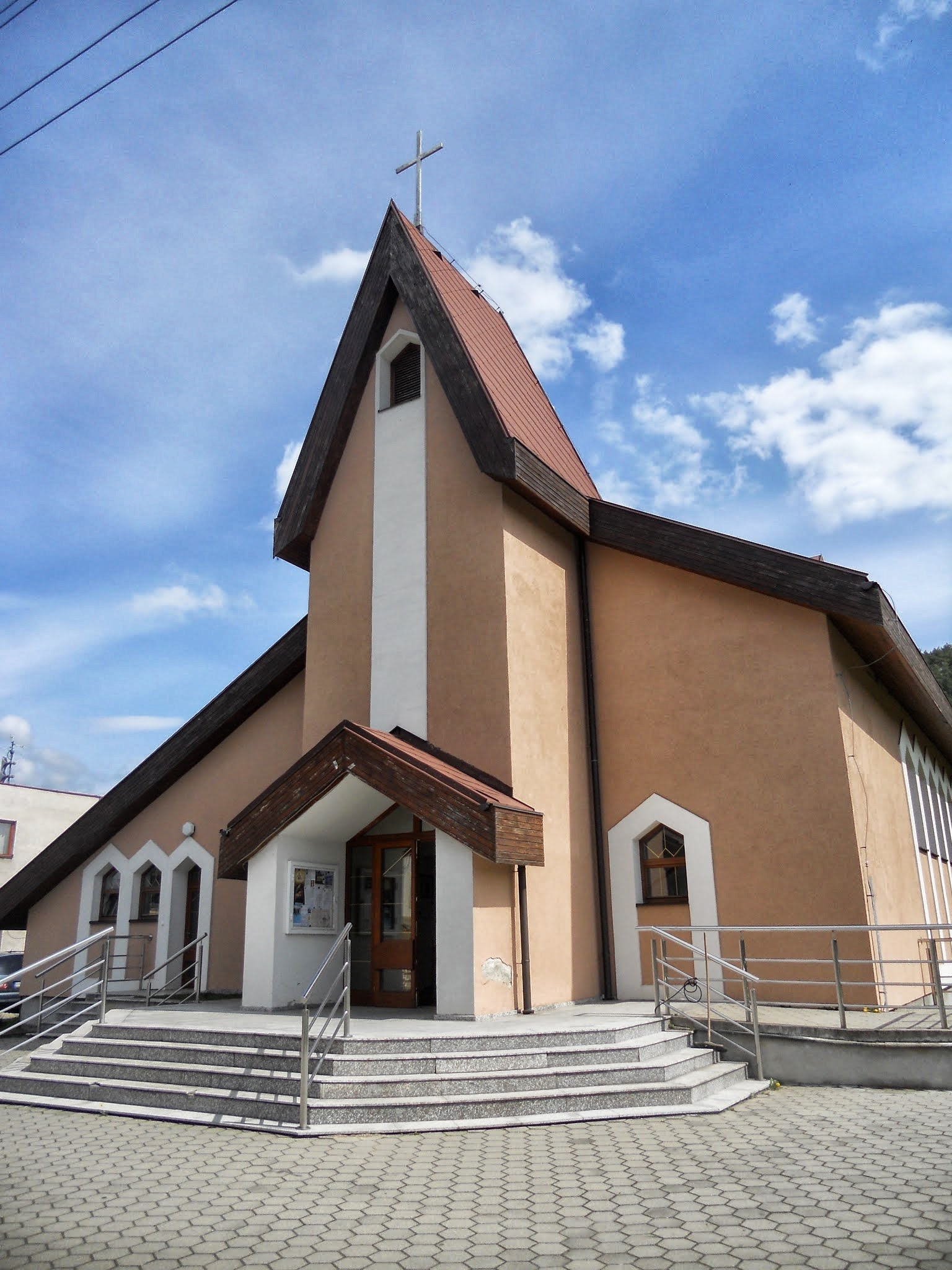

- Flag

- Location of Štiavnička in the Žilina Region Location of Štiavnička in Slovakia
- Coordinates: 49.07°N 19.34°E
- Country: Slovakia
- Region: Žilina Region
- District: Ružomberok District
- First mentioned: 1505

Area
  - Total: 1.71 km^{2} (0.66 sq mi)
- Elevation: 513 m (1,683 ft)

Population (2025)
  - Total: 923
- Time zone: UTC+1 (CET)
  - Summer (DST): UTC+2 (CEST)
- Postal code: 340 1
- Area code: +421 44
- Vehicle registration plate (until 2022): RK
- Website: www.stiavnicka.sk

Štiavnička (Hungarian: Kisselmec) is a village and municipality in Ružomberok District in the Žilina Region of northern Slovakia.

== History ==
In historical records the village was first mentioned in 1505.

== Geography ==
The municipality lies at an altitude of 513 metres (1,683 ft) and covers an area of 1.71 km^{2} (0.66 sq mi) (2025).

== Population ==
Population statistic (10 years)
| Year | 1995 | 2005 | 2015 | 2025 |
|---|---|---|---|---|
| Count | 500 | 571 | 753 | 923 |
| Difference | | +14.2% | +31.87% | +22.57% |

Population statistic
| Year | 2024 | 2025 |
|---|---|---|
| Count | 918 | 923 |
| Difference | | +0.54% |

It has a population of 923 people (31 December 2025).

=== Ethnicity ===
Census 2021 (1+ %)
| Ethnicity | Number | Fraction |
|---|---|---|
| Slovak | 849 | 97.69% |
| Not found out | 12 | 1.38% |
| Total | 869 | |

In year 2021 was 869 people by ethnicity 849 as Slovak, 12 as Not found out, 6 as German, 4 as Hungarian, 3 as Czech, 3 as Other, 1 as Ukrainian, 1 as Italian, 1 as Romani, 1 as Polish, 1 as Iranian, 1 as Croatian and 1 as Albanian.

Note on population: The difference values of population numbers in the table "Population statistic" and in the sections "Ethnicity" & "Religion" is caused by the use of various statistical methods.

=== Religion ===
Census 2021 (1+ %)
| Religion | Number | Fraction |
|---|---|---|
| Roman Catholic Church | 652 | 75.03% |
| None | 157 | 18.07% |
| Evangelical Church | 17 | 1.96% |
| Not found out | 14 | 1.61% |
| Total | 869 | |

In year 2021 was 869 people by religion 652 from Roman Catholic Church, 157 from None, 17 from Evangelical Church, 14 from Not found out, 6 from Greek Catholic Church, 5 from Other and not ascertained christian church, 5 from Baptists Church, 4 from Christian Congregations in Slovakia, 3 from Ad hoc movements, 2 from Jehovah's Witnesses, 1 from Calvinist Church, 1 from Eastern Orthodox Church, 1 from Islam and 1 from Buddhism.
