= Pictures of the Old World =

- Directed by: Dušan Hanák
- Screenplay by: Dušan Hanák
- Produced by: Juraj Král
- Starring: Ladislav Chudík
- Cinematography: Alojz Hanúsek
- Edited by: Alfréd Benčič
- Music by: Václav Hálek
- Production companies: Slovenský film Bratislava, Štúdio hraných filmov Bratislava - Koliba
- Distributed by: Slovenský filmový ústav
- Release date: 1972
- Running time: 64 minutes
- Country: Slovakia
- Language: Slovak

Pictures of the Old World (Slovak: Obrazy starého sveta) is a 1972 Slovak documentary film by Dušan Hanák. The film is about old people who seemingly live at the edge of society. Pictures of the Old World was voted in 2000 by Slovak critics as the best Slovak film of all time. The film won the Best Non-Fiction Film at 1990 Los Angeles Film Critics Association Awards. The film was banned until 1988 and so it is officially premiered in July 1988.

== Characteristics ==
The film consists of dialogues with old people who haven't been "deformed by civilisation." The film tries to find answers to questions of human existence. People featured in the film tell their life stories that are linked to their ancestors' customs. Their lives are often sad and unhappy. The most of them live the remainder of their lives lonely with animals as their only friends.

== See also ==
- List of films considered the best
