= Viktor Kubal =

Slovak cartoonist and filmmaker

- Born: 20 March 1923; Svätý Jur, Czechoslovakia
- Died: 24 April 1997 (aged 74); Bratislava, Slovakia
- Occupations: Cartoonist, animator, filmmaker, director
- Known for: Puf a Muf; Zbojník Jurko; Krvavá pani

Viktor Kubal (20 March 1923 – 24 April 1997) was a Slovak cartoonist, animator, filmmaker, and director, best remembered for directing the cartoon Puf a Muf (1969–1973), and the animated films The Weatherman (1983), Zbojník Jurko (1976) and Krvavá pani (1980). He has been called the father of animation in Slovakia and has been noted for making the first animated feature film in Slovakia. He also collaborated with Vladimir Kubenko.

== Career ==
Kubal was born in Svätý Jur near Bratislava. He worked in film from 1943, first at the Školfilm studio and later at the Slovak film studio (Slovenská filmová tvorba) in Koliba, Bratislava. Over 27 years he made almost four hundred short animated films as a director and animator, among them the series Dita (based on a comic of the same name in the humour weekly Roháč), Janko Hraško and Puf a Muf. His feature-length animated films were Zbojník Jurko (1976), Krvavá pani (1980) and Marcipánová komédia (1987). He also drew cartoons and satire for Roháč and other periodicals, and wrote books for children. In 1995 the Slovak Minister of Culture gave him the Paľo Bielik Award for his pioneering work in Slovak animated film.
