= Everything I Like =

1993 film

- Directed by: Martin Šulík
- Written by: Martin Šulík
- Starring: Juraj Nvota
- Release date: 14 September 1993 (TIFF)
- Running time: 90 minutes
- Country: Slovakia
- Language: Slovak

Everything I Like (Slovak: Všetko čo mám rád) is a 1993 Slovak drama film directed by Martin Šulík. The film was selected as the Slovak entry for the Best Foreign Language Film at the 66th Academy Awards, but was not accepted as a nominee.

== Cast ==
- Juraj Nvota as Tomás
- Gina Bellman as Ann
- Zdena Studenková as Magda
- Jirí Menzel as Vasek
- Jakub Ursiny
- Rudolf Sloboda as Writer

== See also ==
- List of submissions to the 66th Academy Awards for Best Foreign Language Film
- List of Slovak submissions for the Academy Award for Best Foreign Language Film
