= Vladimir Kubenko =

Slovak documentary director

Vladimír "Vlado" Kubenko (10 August 1924 in Poprad – 26 May 1993 in Bratislava) was a Slovak documentary director, considered a pioneer of documentary films in Slovakia. He is best known for his collaborations with Viktor Kubal, and his direction of the films Peklo (1967), Žehra (1968), and Návraty za šťastím (1970).
