= Pavol Socháň =

Slovak photographer, ethnographer, writer and artist

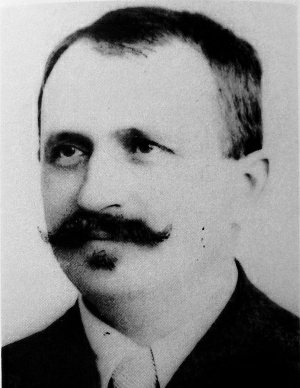
Pavol Socháň (date unknown)

Pavol Socháň (6 June 1862 – 26 January 1941) was a Slovak photographer, ethnographer, writer and artist. He employed numerous pseudonyms, including Borivoj Rehtáčka, Dobroslav Pokrievka, Matej Trúbela, P. S. Zvonický, and Dušan Lipeň.

== Biography ==
Socháň was born on 6 June 1862 in Liptovský Mikuláš. His father was a Master saddler. He began his education at the Evangelical school in Kežmarok, but was expelled for teaching Slovak to his fellow students, which was forbidden at that time. Then, from 1879 to 1881, he attended the teacher training institute in Lučenec, but was expelled again for his "patriotic activities". As a result, he was banned from all the local schools. After that, he moved to Prague, where he studied at the Academy of Fine Arts from 1882 to 1885, with František Čermák and Antonín Lhota. While there, he audited lectures in ethnography at Charles University. Finally, he attended the Academy of Fine Arts, Munich, where he learned photography. Upon returning to Prague, he became an apprentice in the studios of Jindřich Eckert.

He left Prague in 1891 and, after a short stay in his hometown, settled in Martin, where he opened his own photography studio. It was there he began devoting himself to ethnographic research; collecting folk literature and art and documenting the local culture photographically. He also wrote dramatic works and articles for local newspapers and journals. In addition, he was one of the co-founders of the Slovak Museum Society and organized exhibitions of Slovak art; notably at the Ethnographic Exposition of 1895 in Prague. One of his plays, Sedliacká nevesta (The Peasant Bride), was branded as anti-Hungarian sedition. Although he never went to trial, his situation there became untenable.

From 1912 to 1914, he was back in Prague, where he devoted himself primarily to journalistic work. After the outbreak of World War I a warrant was issued for his arrest, stemming from earlier suspicions about his loyalty, and he fled to the United States. There, he lived in New York and Pittsburgh, working as a teacher, and an editor of Slovak-language publications. After the war, in 1919, he went back to Prague and held several clerical positions. He also adapted some of his plays for the radio. From 1923, he worked as a journalist in Bratislava. Later, he contributed entries about Slovakia to Otto's encyclopedia.

Much of his editorial work was done for the Národný deník (National Daily). When it ceased publication, he had no regular income, so he attempted to make a living writing funny stories and sketches. He died on 26 January 1941 in Bratislava, at the age of 78, and was interred at the National Cemetery in Martin. The architect Dušan Jurkovič designed a monument for him but, due to the war, it was never realized.

== Selected photographs ==
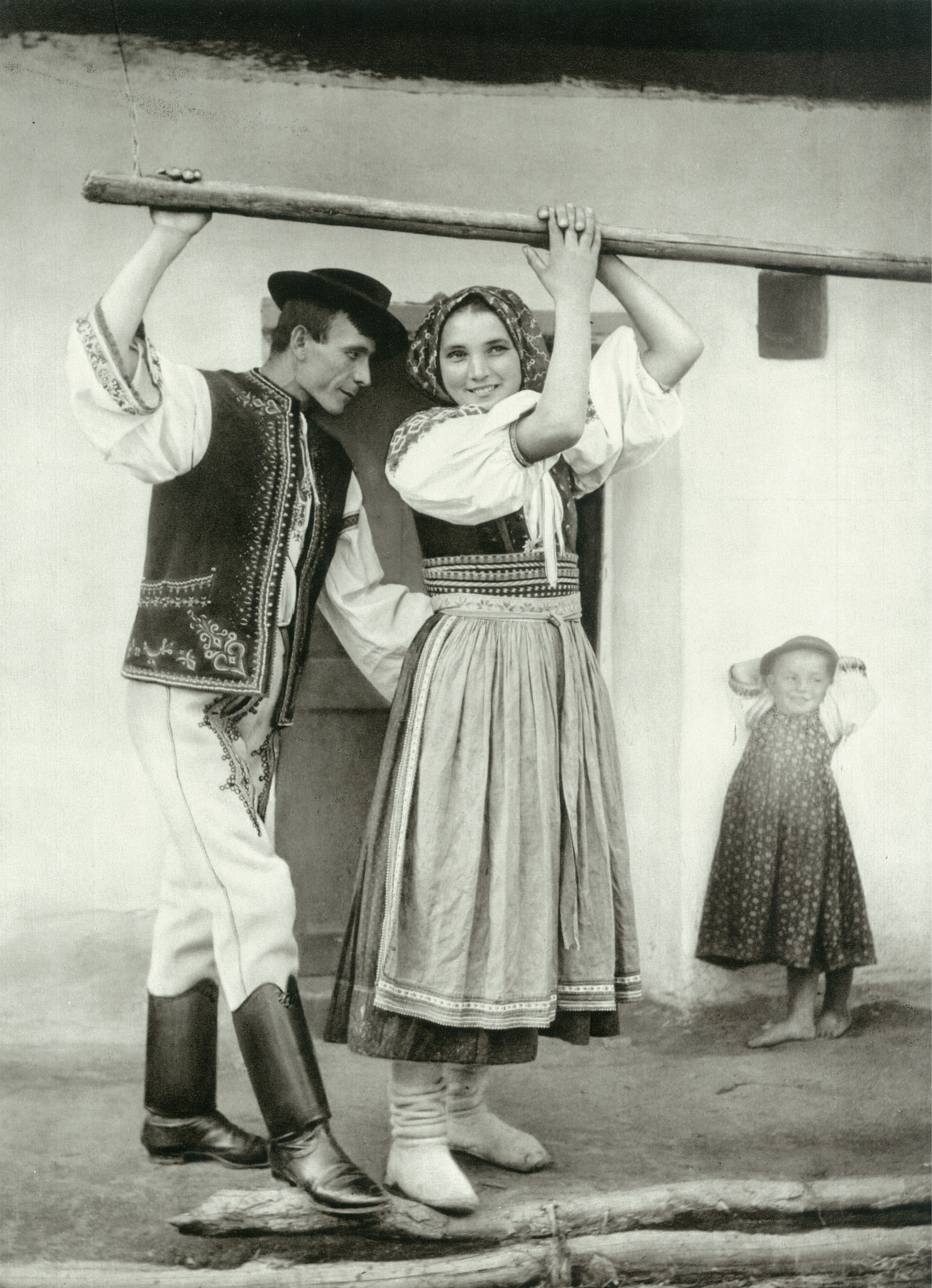
Under the Eaves

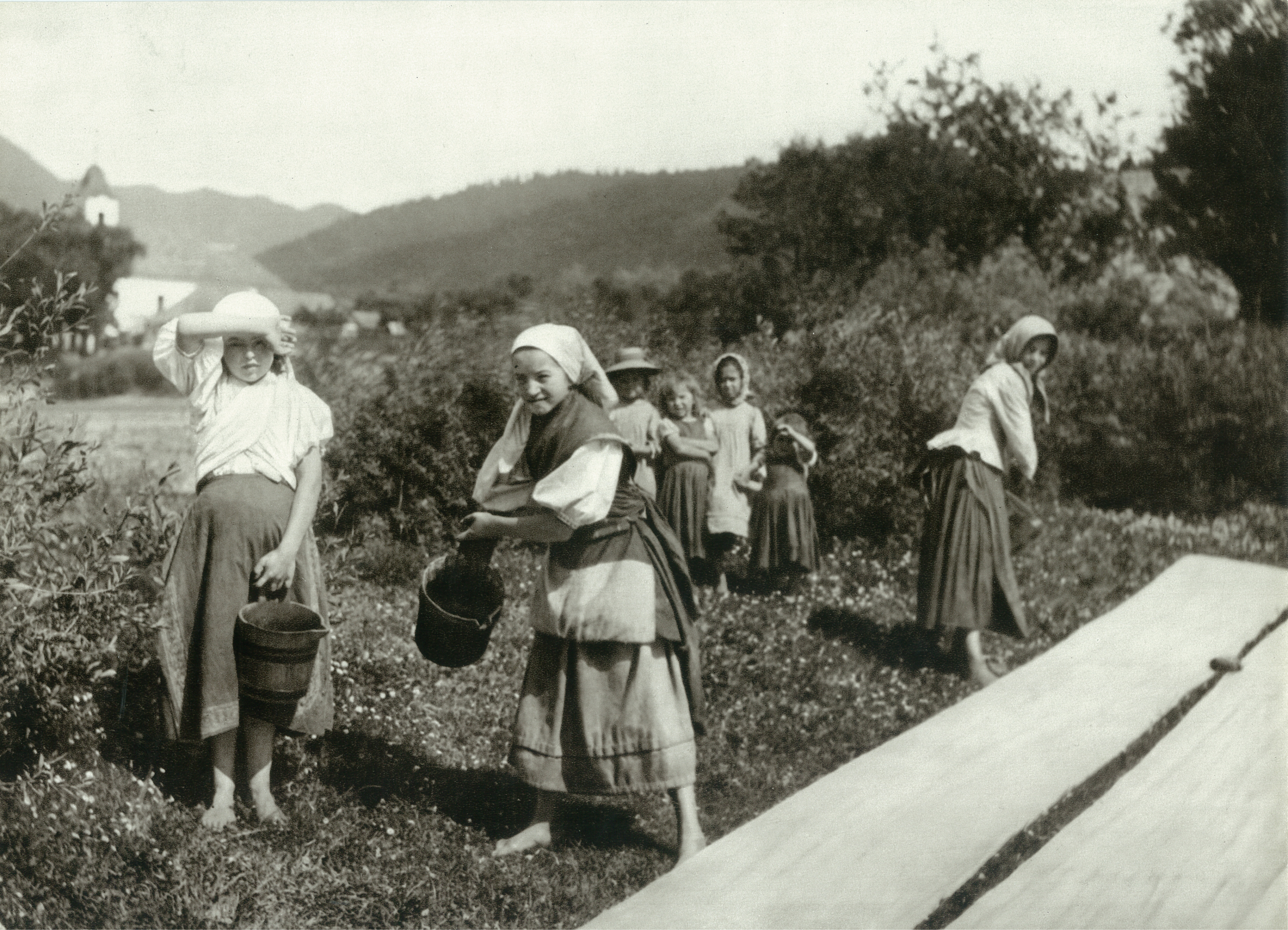
Cloth Dowsing

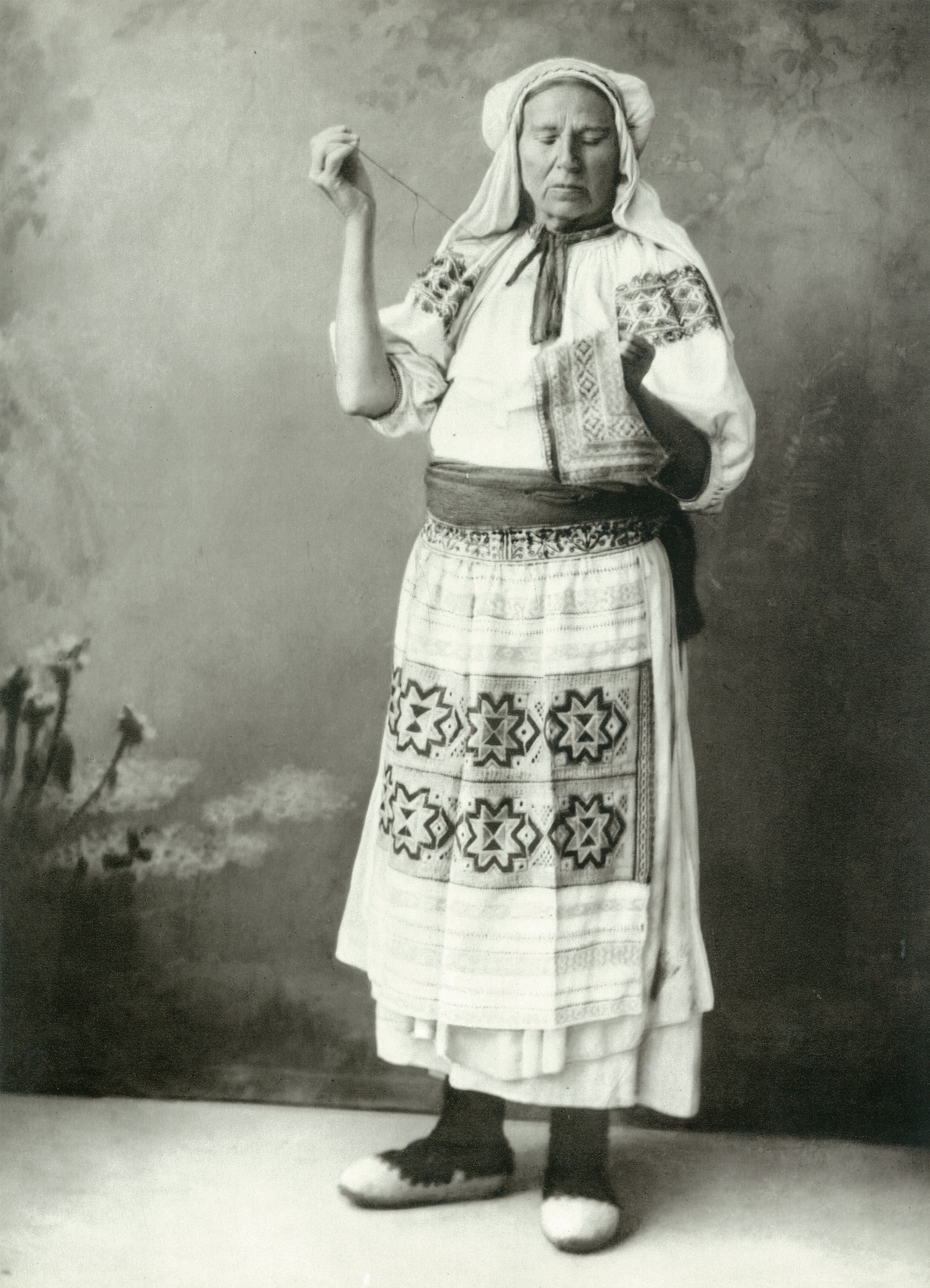
Embroideress from Zliechov

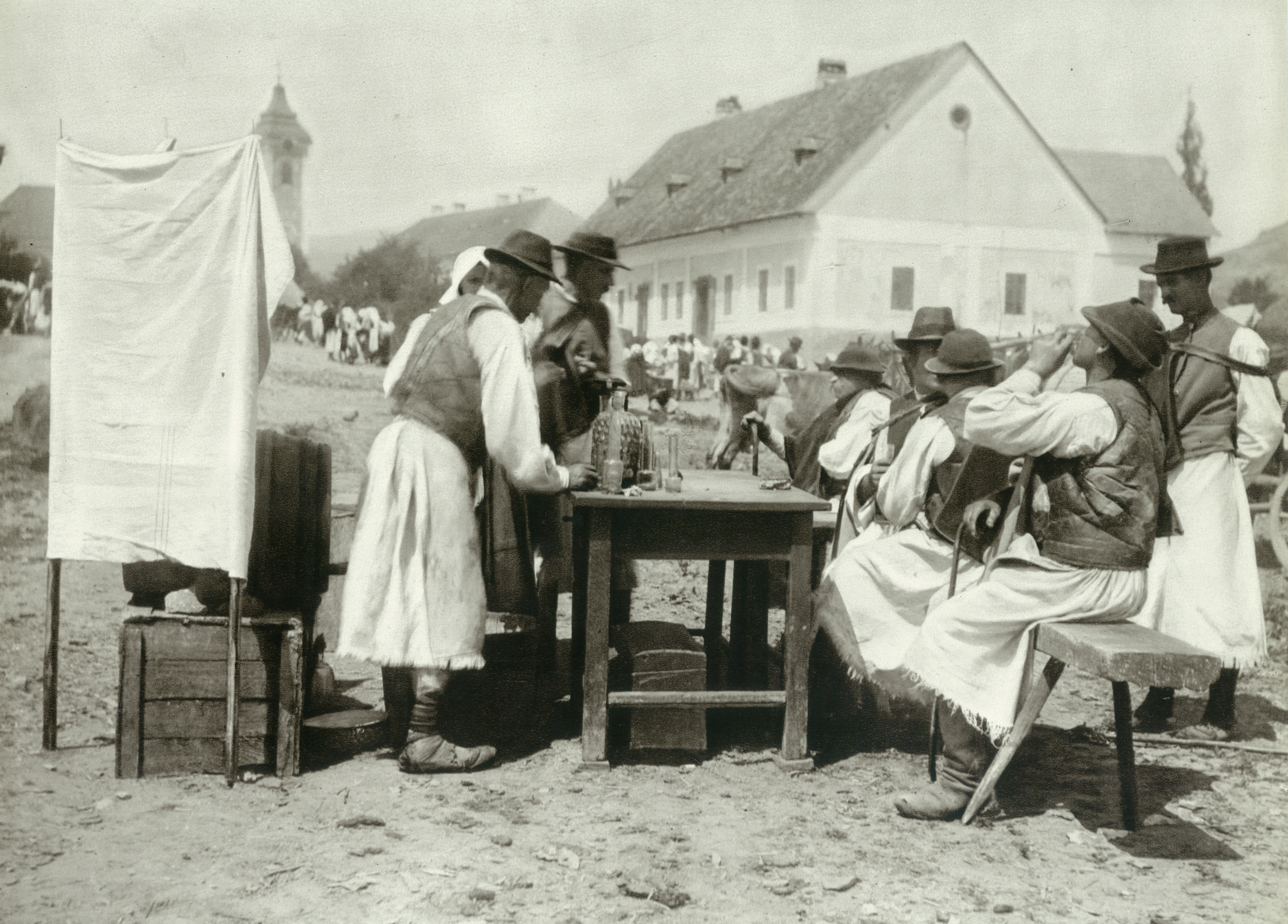
Drinks at the Fair in Detva

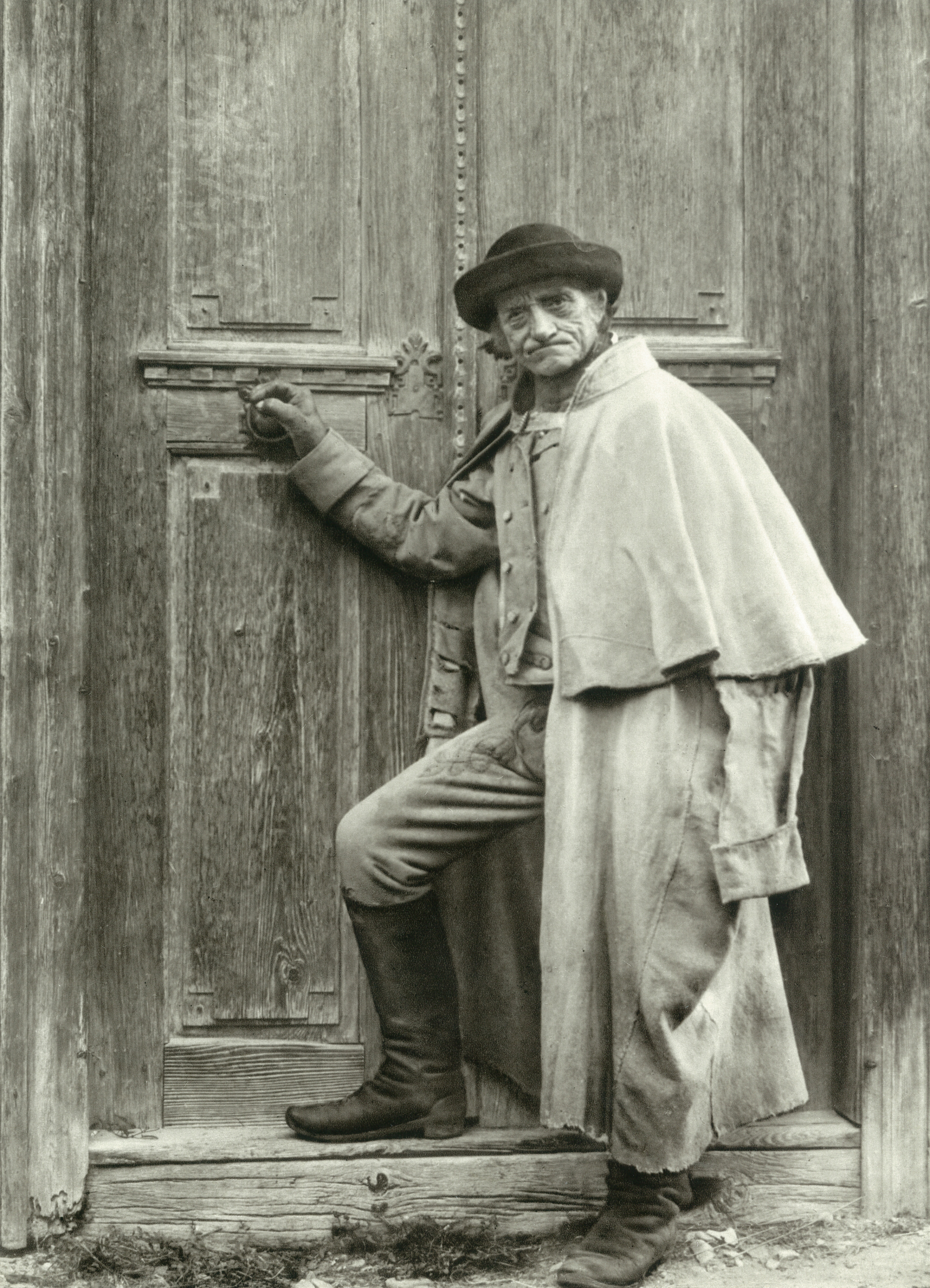
Old man from Trenčín

== Sources ==
- Slovak Biographical Dictionary, Vol.5, Matica slovenská, 1992, pp.308-309 ISBN 80-7090-216-7
- Alžbeta Güntherová: "Pavol Socháň" (obituary). In: Elán, Vol.11, #5 (Online)
- Dana Lacková: Pavol Socháň - lyrik národopisnej fotografie (exhibition catalog), Slovenská národná knižnica, 2011 ISBN 978-80-89301-88-1
- Martin Slivka and Alexander Strelinger: "Pavol Socháň", Vol.4 of Fotograf a dielo, Osveta, 1985
- Antonín Václavík: "Pavel Socháň 70-ročný". In: Slovenské pohľady, 1932, pp.383-387
