= Goldener Saal =

Coordinates: 48.3687°N 10.8987°E

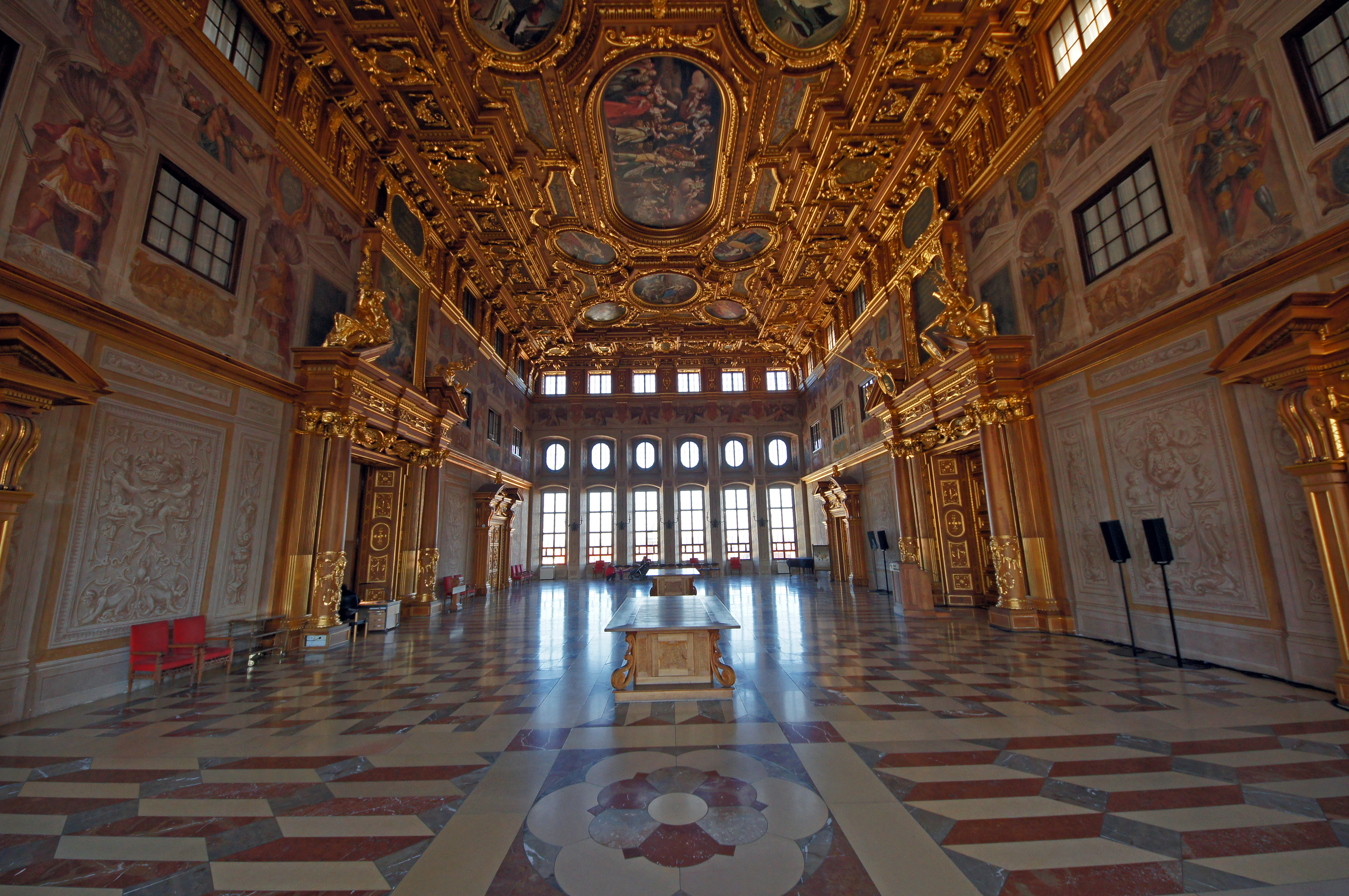
"Goldener Saal"

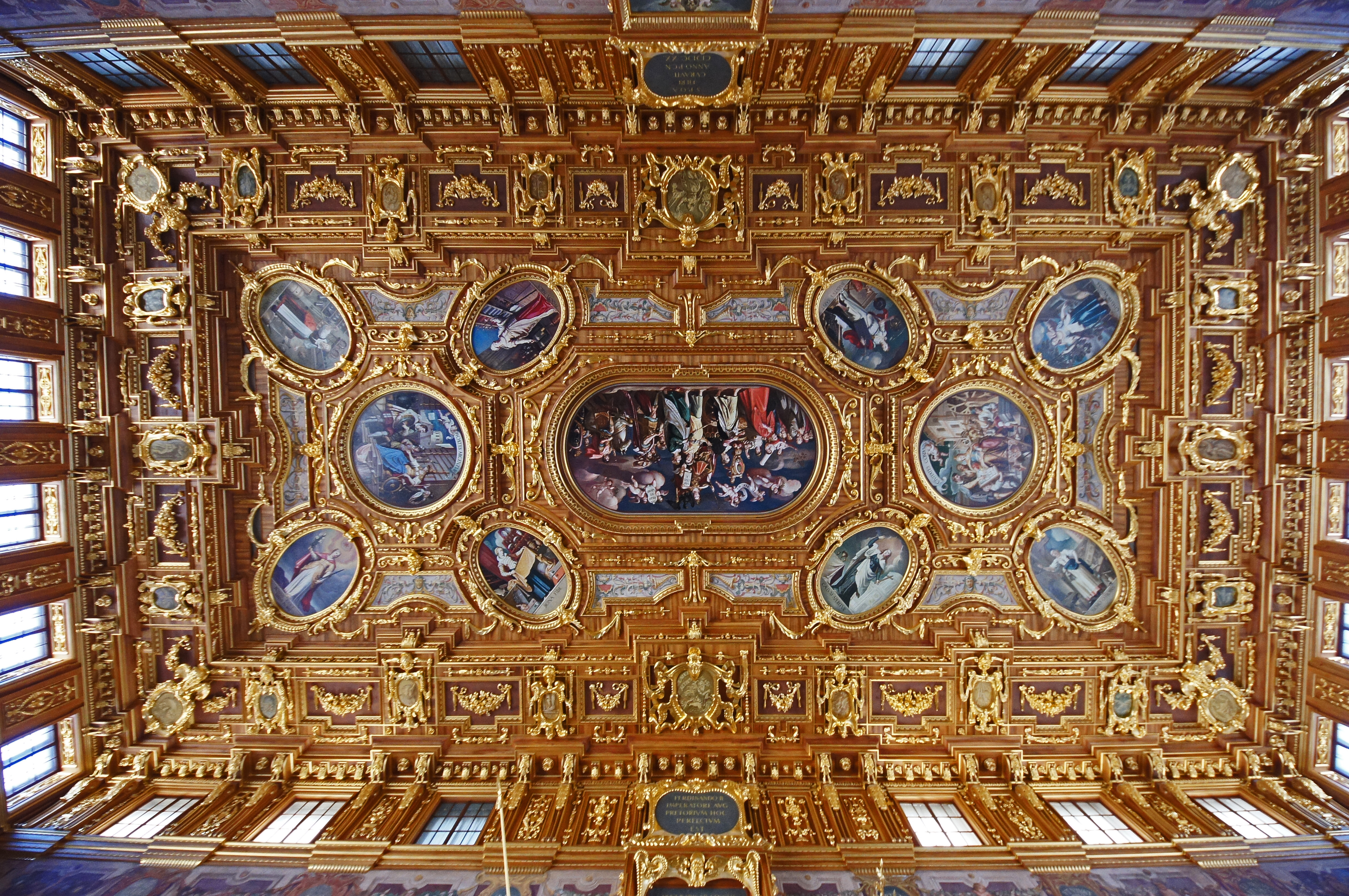
ceiling

The Goldener Saal (Golden Hall) is a ceremonial room in the 3rd floor of Augsburg Town Hall, which is famous for its ceiling paintings, murals, and golden wall decoration. It was finished in 1643 and is one of the most important cultural monuments of the late Renaissance.

The room was built after plans by Elias Holl. In 1944, the Town Hall and the Goldener Saal were destroyed by an air raid and were reconstructed in 1996.
