= I Love, You Love (1989 film) =

1989 film

- Directed by: Dušan Hanák
- Written by: Dušan Hanák; Dušan Dušek
- Starring: Roman Kłosowski
- Cinematography: Alojz Hanúsek
- Edited by: Alfréd Bencic
- Release date: February 1989
- Running time: 95 minutes
- Country: Czechoslovakia
- Language: Slovak

I Love, You Love (Slovak: Ja milujem, ty miluješ) is a 1989 Czechoslovak drama film directed by Dušan Hanák. It was entered into the 39th Berlin International Film Festival where Hanák won the Silver Bear for Best Director.

== Cast ==
- Roman Kłosowski as Pista
- Milan Jelić as Vinco
- Iva Janžurová as Viera
- Milada Jezková as Mother
- Václav Babka as Albín
- Marie Motlová as Sida
- Ludovit Reiter
- Juraj Nvota as Jaro
- Ivan Palúch as Rudo
- Vera Bílá as Berta (as Bílá Viera)
