= Juraj Nvota =

Slovak actor and director (born 1954)

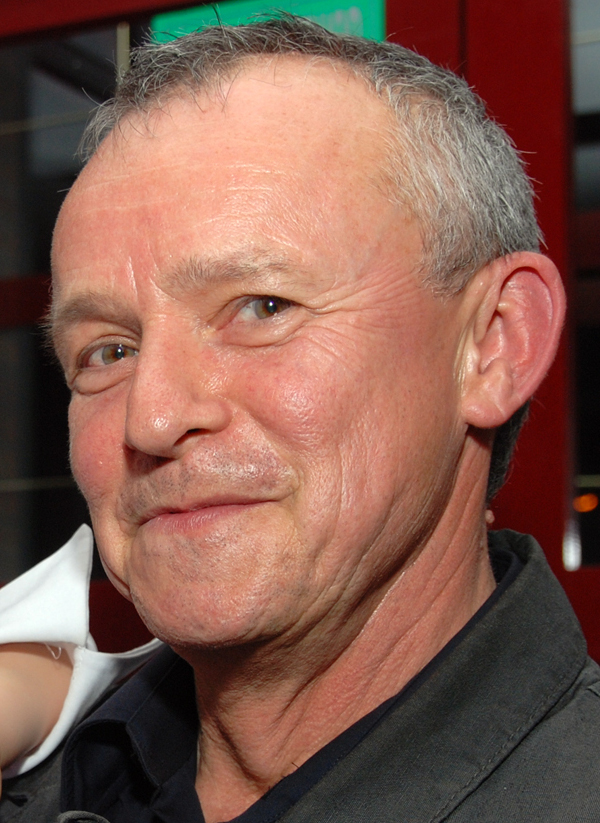
- Born: 1 March 1954; Bratislava, Czechoslovakia (now Slovakia)
- Occupations: Actor, Film director
- Years active: 1977–present

Juraj Nvota (born 1 March 1954) is a Slovak actor and film director.

== Selected filmography ==
=== Director ===
Film
Year	Title	Role	Notes
2002	Kruté radosti		
2008	Music		
2012	Konfident		

=== Actor ===
Film
Year	Title	Role	Notes
2016	I, Olga Hepnarová		
2010	Občanský průkaz		
1993	Everything I Like		
1989	I Love, You Love		
