= Dušan Hanák =

Slovak film director (born 1938)

- Born: 27 April 1938 (age 88); Bratislava, Czechoslovakia
- Education: FAMU
- Occupations: Film director, screenwriter
- Years active: 1969–1995
- Employer: Academy of Performing Arts in Bratislava
- Notable work: 322; Pictures of the Old World; Rosy Dreams; I Love, You Love
- Awards: Silver Bear for Best Director (1989); Pribina Cross, First Class (2004); Crystal Globe (2008)

Dušan Hanák (April 27, 1938) is a Slovak film director.

Hanák graduated from the FAMU (Film and TV School of the Academy of Performing Arts) in Prague in 1965. He began with a series of shorts at the Koliba film studios in Bratislava. Several of them received awards, and so did his first feature film 322 (the code for cancer in medical records of diseases, 1969).

== Career ==
Theatrical release poster for 322

Hanák followed 322 with the feature-length documentary Pictures of the Old World (Obrazy starého sveta, 1972), partly a meditation on what lies hidden beneath the concept of "an authentic life", a theme already addressed in 322. Although Hanák was treated with suspicion by the more repressive communist authorities that took over after the Warsaw Pact invasion of Czechoslovakia, he found an early refuge in a topic sufficiently removed from big politics to survive on the margins of official production while reaching wide international appeal. In one section, an old man talks with great fascination and lucidity about space travel, recalling how two astronauts walked on the Moon and collected rocks while a third circled in their spaceship. Tacked to the wall of his crumbling shack is a small photograph of men walking on the Moon. It is a work whose images could apply to Appalachia or any other poor region. Pictures of the Old World was ordered shelved a brief theatrical run. Yet despite the authorities' surly take on Hanák's films, his next venture, Rosy Dreams, turned out to be another original work. His film I Love, You Love won the Silver Bear for Best Director at the 39th Berlin International Film Festival.

== Filmography ==
- 322 (1969)
- Pictures of the Old World (1972)
- Rosy Dreams (1977)
- Silent Joy (1985)
- I Love, You Love (1989)
- Private Lives (1990)
- Paper Heads (1995)
