= Trhovište =

Village and municipality in Slovakia

Trhovište Vásárhely
- Municipality
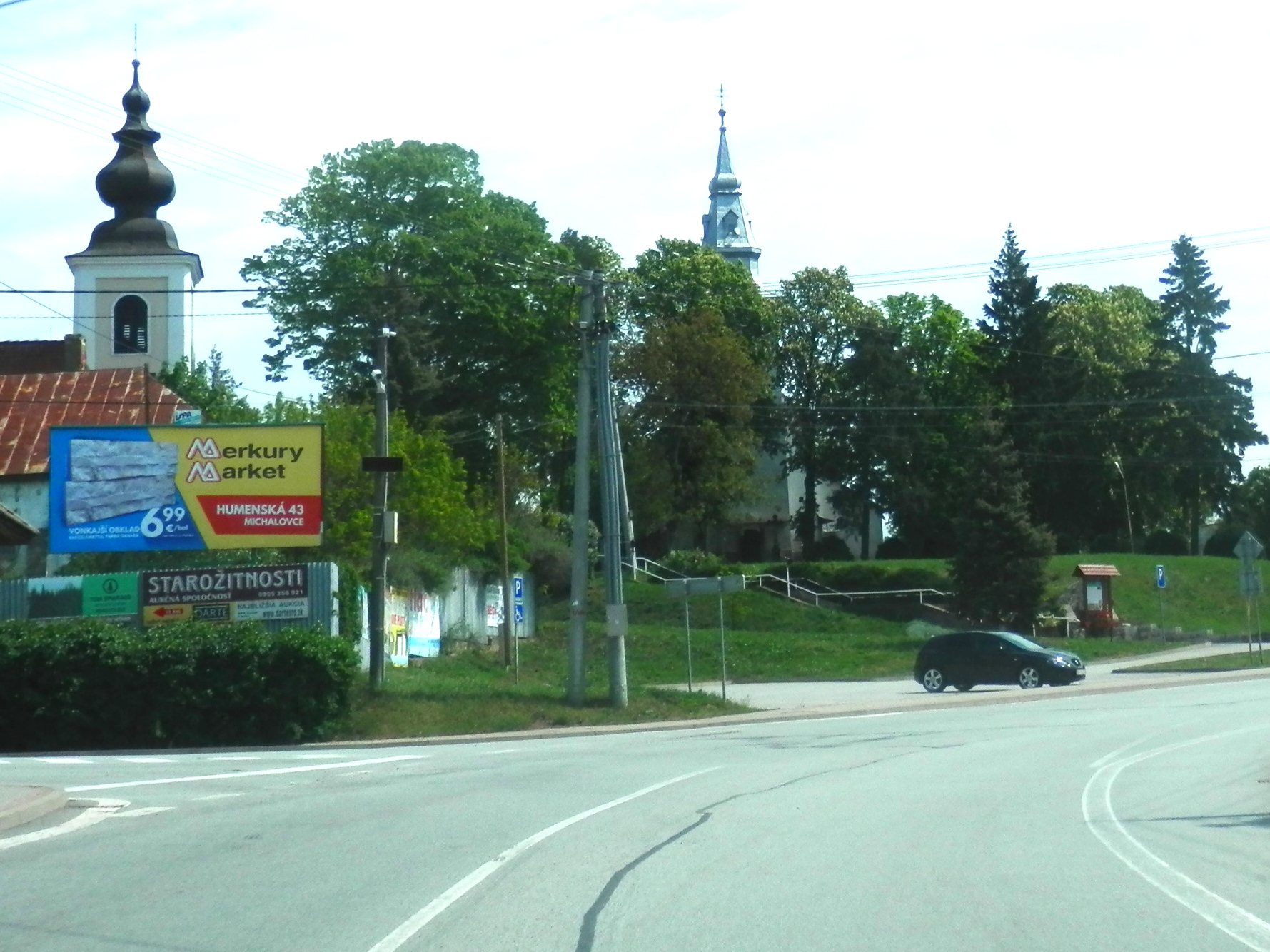

- Flag

- Location of Trhovište in the Košice Region Location of Trhovište in Slovakia
- Coordinates: 48.70°N 21.82°E
- Country: Slovakia
- Region: Košice Region
- District: Michalovce District
- First mentioned: 1220

Area
  - Total: 12.56 km^{2} (4.85 sq mi)
- Elevation: 132 m (433 ft)

Population (2025)
  - Total: 2,209
- Time zone: UTC+1 (CET)
  - Summer (DST): UTC+2 (CEST)
- Postal code: 720 4
- Area code: +421 56
- Vehicle registration plate (until 2022): MI
- Website: www.trhoviste.sk

Trhovište (Hungarian: Vásárhely) is a village and municipality in Michalovce District in the Košice Region of eastern Slovakia.

== History ==
In historical records the village was first mentioned in 1220 as Vasarhel.

== Geography ==
The municipality lies at an altitude of 132 metres (433 ft) and covers an area of 12.56 km^{2} (4.85 sq mi) (2025).

== Population ==
Population statistic (10 years)
Year	1995	2005	2015	2025
Count	1561	1821	1949	2209
Difference		+16.65%	+7.02%	+13.34%

Population statistic
Year	2024	2025
Count	2161	2209
Difference		+2.22%

It has a population of 2209 people (31 December 2025).

=== Ethnicity ===
Census 2021 (1+ %)
Ethnicity	Number	Fraction
Slovak	1955	93.54%
Romani	741	35.45%
Not found out	111	5.31%
Total	2090	

In year 2021 was 2090 people by ethnicity 1955 as Slovak, 741 as Romani, 111 as Not found out, 7 as Czech, 6 as Hungarian, 4 as Ukrainian, 3 as Russian, 1 as Serbian, 1 as Rusyn, 1 as Polish and 1 as German.

Note on population: The difference values of population numbers in the table "Population statistic" and in the sections "Ethnicity" & "Religion" is caused by the use of various statistical methods.

=== Religion ===
Census 2021 (1+ %)
Religion	Number	Fraction
Roman Catholic Church	1349	64.55%
Greek Catholic Church	195	9.33%
Calvinist Church	188	9%
None	151	7.22%
Not found out	99	4.74%
Evangelical Church	43	2.06%
Jehovah's Witnesses	40	1.91%
Total	2090	

In year 2021 was 2090 people by religion 1349 from Roman Catholic Church, 195 from Greek Catholic Church, 188 from Calvinist Church, 151 from None, 99 from Not found out, 43 from Evangelical Church, 40 from Jehovah's Witnesses, 16 from Eastern Orthodox Church, 5 from Church of the Brethren, 3 from United Methodist Church and 1 from Christian Congregations in Slovakia.

== Government ==
The village has its own birth registry and police force.

== Economy ==
The village has a petrol station and an insurance company.

== Culture ==
The village has a public library, gymnasium, and a football pitch.

== See also ==
- List of municipalities and towns in Michalovce District
- List of municipalities and towns in Slovakia
