= Perinbaba: Two Realms =

- Theatrical release poster
- Perinbaba a dva svety
- Directed by: Juraj Jakubisko
- Written by: Juraj Jakubisko
- Produced by: Deana Horváthová
- Starring: Lukáš Frlajs; Valerie Kaplanová; Giulietta Masina (digital likeness)
- Cinematography: Ján Ďuriš
- Edited by: Ondřej Šošolík
- Music by: Ondřej Soukup; Jan Jirásek; Petr Hapka
- Production companies: J&J Jakubisko Film
- Distributed by: Bontonfilm
- Release dates: 7 December 2023 (Slovakia and Czechia)
- Running time: 106 minutes
- Countries: Slovakia; Czechia
- Language: Slovak

Perinbaba: Two Realms is the 2023 sequel of the 1985 Czechoslovak fairy tale movie The Feather Fairy. It is the final movie of the Slovak director Juraj Jakubisko. The movie was in making for over ten years. The premiere was repeatedly delayed due to the COVID-19 pandemic and eventually took place in December 2023, nine months after Jakubisko's death.

== Plot ==
Lukáš, a young man with a little dog, seeking happiness and joy, embarks on a journey into the world. His godmother, the celestial being Perinbaba, watches over him. He arrives late to the fairytale land of abundance where Perinbaba guides him. The once prosperous kingdom is now cursed. The magical ram has vanished, and where cakes once grew on trees, ignorance, fear, and apprehension now reign.

Courageous and determined, Lukáš vows to break the curse. However, he is ultimately forced to choose between what his heart desires most: wealth or love.

== Cast ==
- Lukáš Frlajs – Lukáš
- Valéria Frištik – Lucia
- Giulietta Masina – Perinbaba (digitally altered archive footage)
- Ivan Romančík
- René Štúr
- Daniel Nekonečný
- Andrea Verešová
- Darija Pavlovičová
- Sabina Skalická
- Ľubomír Paulovič

== Production ==
The filming of the movie started in February 2017 after a long period of preparation and took over two years to finish. The film was shot in the Eastern Slovakia localities of Prešov, Kežmarok, Gelnica and Podbiel. The film crew was over 100 people strong and involved more than 300 extras.

== Release ==
The movie premiered on 7 December 2023 simultaneously in Czechia and Slovakia. The distribution company Bontonfilm released the movie in the record number of 101 cinemas all around the two countries.

== Critical reception ==
The movie was poorly received by critics. According to Michal Korec writing for kinema.sk, children, the movie's primary audience, are not able to follow complicated narrative of the film and were seeing leaving the room in the middle of the movie during its premiere. Mirka Spáčilová of Mladá fronta Dnes likewise characterized the movie as "chaotic", although she praised its visuals.

== Box office ==
In spite of the poor reviews, Perinbaba: Two Realms was a commercial success in Slovakia. It attracted the record number of over 50,000 viewers in Slovak cinemas, beating both Oppenheimer and Barbie for the most viewed movie of 2023. Nonetheless, the Czech audience largely snubbed the movie, with only about 20,000 Czech viewers coming to see it.
