= Ingola =

Slovak singer (born 1973)

Ingrid Vranovičová (born May 1, 1973, Bratislava) known by her stage name Ingola is Slovak female singer, and has been active since 1995.

== Discography ==
- 1995: Set me free
- 1997: Svet patrí bláznom
- 1999: Máš, čo si chcel
- 2001: Som Tvoj anjel
- 2002: Reč dvoch tiel
- 2004: Popíš ma

In 1985, she has performed in "Páslo dievča pávy", the title song of the soundtrack of the Slovak movie "Perinbaba", directed by Juraj Jakubisko.
