= Jodi Leib =

American painter

Jodi Leib is an American artist and independent filmmaker, focusing primarily on issues of human rights, music, popular culture, and reproductive health.

== Biography ==
Born and raised in suburban Detroit, she began creating art at a young age, expressing herself through acting, photography, and painting.

== Education ==
As a student at the University of Michigan, Leib studied a wide range of subjects including nursing, natural resources, psychology, and business administration before choosing an artistic career path as an independent filmmaker.

=== Drama therapy ===
In May 2010, Leib completed her master's degree in drama therapy and psychology theory from Lesley University. For her thesis project, Leib directed an acting class using drama therapy as a technique to unblock creativity.

== Film, Television, and Music ==
=== Casino ===
In 1994, Leib moved to Los Angeles and began working in film production as an assistant director, camera assistant, and electronic press kit director. She is an uncredited production assistant on Martin Scorsese's film Casino.

=== Woman’s Solitude ===
Leib wrote, produced, and directed Woman's Solitude, a short film that won the Blockbuster Entertainment Award for Audience Favorite at the 1997 Wine Country Film Festival. The film touched on themes related to romance and unrequited love. The film has also screened at Academy of Motion Picture Arts and Sciences, Laemmle Sunset 5, New York International Independent Film and Video Festival, Taos Talking Pictures Film Festival, Palm Springs International Festival of Short Films and Market, and most recently at the Screen Actors Guild.

=== Talk It Out! ===
From 2000 to 2005, Leib was featured in a one-woman show and hosted a cable and online program called Talk It Out! with Jodi Leib. Through her Talk It Out! interviews, Leib has discussed in-depth issues such as the fear of flying with Benjamin Burnley of Breaking Benjamin, organic nutrition with Danielle Evin at Farm Aid, reproductive health with Moby, Janeane Garofalo, and Gloria Steinem at March for Women's Lives, and world love with The Black Eyed Peas.

=== Monday's Child ===
Concurrently, Leib penned the early drafts of the Monday’s Child screenplay, inspired by the many personal stories people shared about their reproductive health care and human rights. Leib became involved in the reproductive rights movement by attending the March for Women's Lives as a journalist in 2004 and volunteering as a board member of Young Professionals Council for Choice in 2007, shortly after she moving to New York City in 2005. Leib has spoken out for women's rights and the power of choice, and has been featured in blogs such as Words of Choice.

=== Red Love Redemption ===
While living in New York, Leib wrote, produced, and directed Red Love Redemption, a short film entry for the FOX reality series On the Lot. The film explores a mother-daughter relationship and received Best Picture and Best Acting nominations in the user-generated audience awards.

=== Musical Career ===
Leib is also a musician. She released her first single, "Love is Mystical" on February 15, 2005.

== Artist and painter ==
In addition to her filmmaking and drama therapy, Leib is also a multimedia artist and painter and has exhibited her artwork through various shows in New York, Los Angeles, Detroit, Southampton, and Connecticut. Her work explores themes related to sexuality, war, relationships, harmony, violence, and music. Her brush strokes are broad and varied, sometimes using fine lines and geometrical shapes and other times liberally painting through improvisation. Leib's artwork has shown in exhibitions for Iraq Moratorium, GLAAD, AdCraft Club of Detroit, and many pieces have been purchased into private collections such as the Leslie Lohman Gay Art Foundation. Leib's newest paintings are currently in an art exhibition at the Bego Ezair gallery in Southampton, New York.
