= An Ambiguous Report About the End of the World =

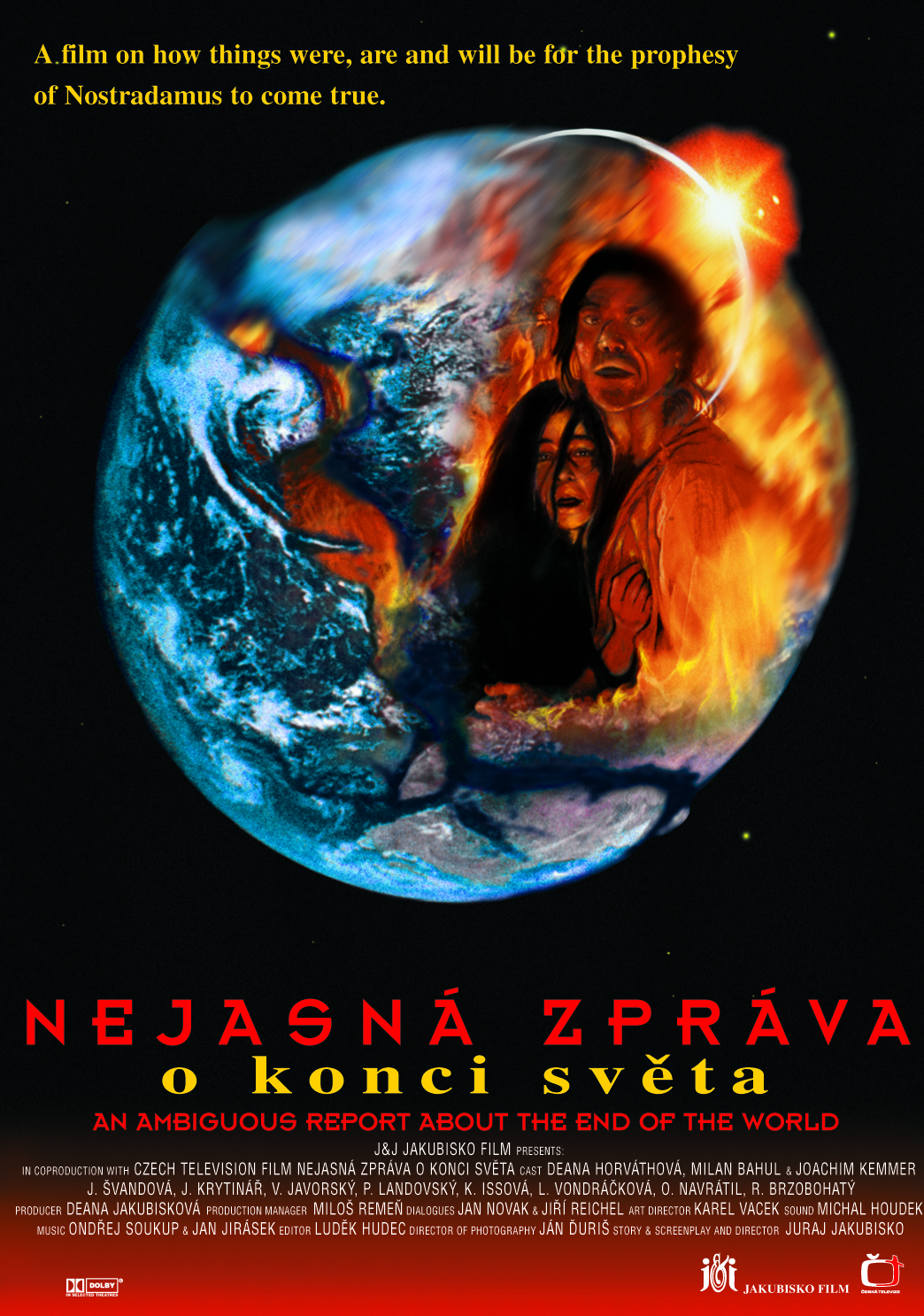
- Directed by: Juraj Jakubisko
- Written by: Juraj Jakubisko
- Produced by: Deana Horváthová
- Starring: Deana Horváthová; Milan Bahúl; Joachim Kemmer; Lucie Vondráčková; Klára Issová; Pavel Landovský
- Cinematography: Ján Duris
- Music by: Jan Jirásek; Ondřej Soukup
- Production companies: Jakubisko film, Czech Television
- Distributed by: Falcon
- Release date: 13 February 1997
- Running time: 158 minutes
- Country: Czech Republic
- Language: Czech

An Ambiguous Report About the End of the World (Czech: Nejasná zpráva o konci světa) is a 1997 Czech film directed by Juraj Jakubisko. It is a symbolic story of ill-fated love set in central Europe.

== Synopsis ==
A magical and realistic vision of an unbalanced world takes place in a village in the mountains at the end of the world - at an unknown time. The village in a picturesque setting is a metaphor for the world and humanity at the rise of the 3rd millennium. During the 25 years when the story takes place, we can see change over several generations and various symbols of different civilizations, church and culture. The main motif of the film is the love between Verona and Goran. Their passionate relationship is so different from any other and so they have to be punished in the name of so-called morality and equality. By following them, the village people are trying to hide their transgressions against nature and themselves. Patriarchal rituals are in conflict with a civilization without God and equality. Nature punishes them with earthquakes. The houses of all the guilty people are destroyed. Wolves are a symbol of danger.

== Cast ==
- Deana Horváthová as Verona
- Milan Bahúl as Goran
- Joachim Kemmer as Madina
- Klára Issová as Veronika
- Jana Švandová as Marlyn
- Jiří Krytinář as Juzek
- Vladimír Javorský as Semek
- Pavel Landovský as Rychtar, The Magistrate
- Peter Šimun as The Barber
- Yvetta Kornová as Margot
- Sandra Pogodová as Fagot
- Lucie Vondráčková as Lucie
- Vladimír Sadílek as Pop
- Matěj Hádek as Michal
