= Ľubomír Paulovič =

Slovak actor (1952–2024)

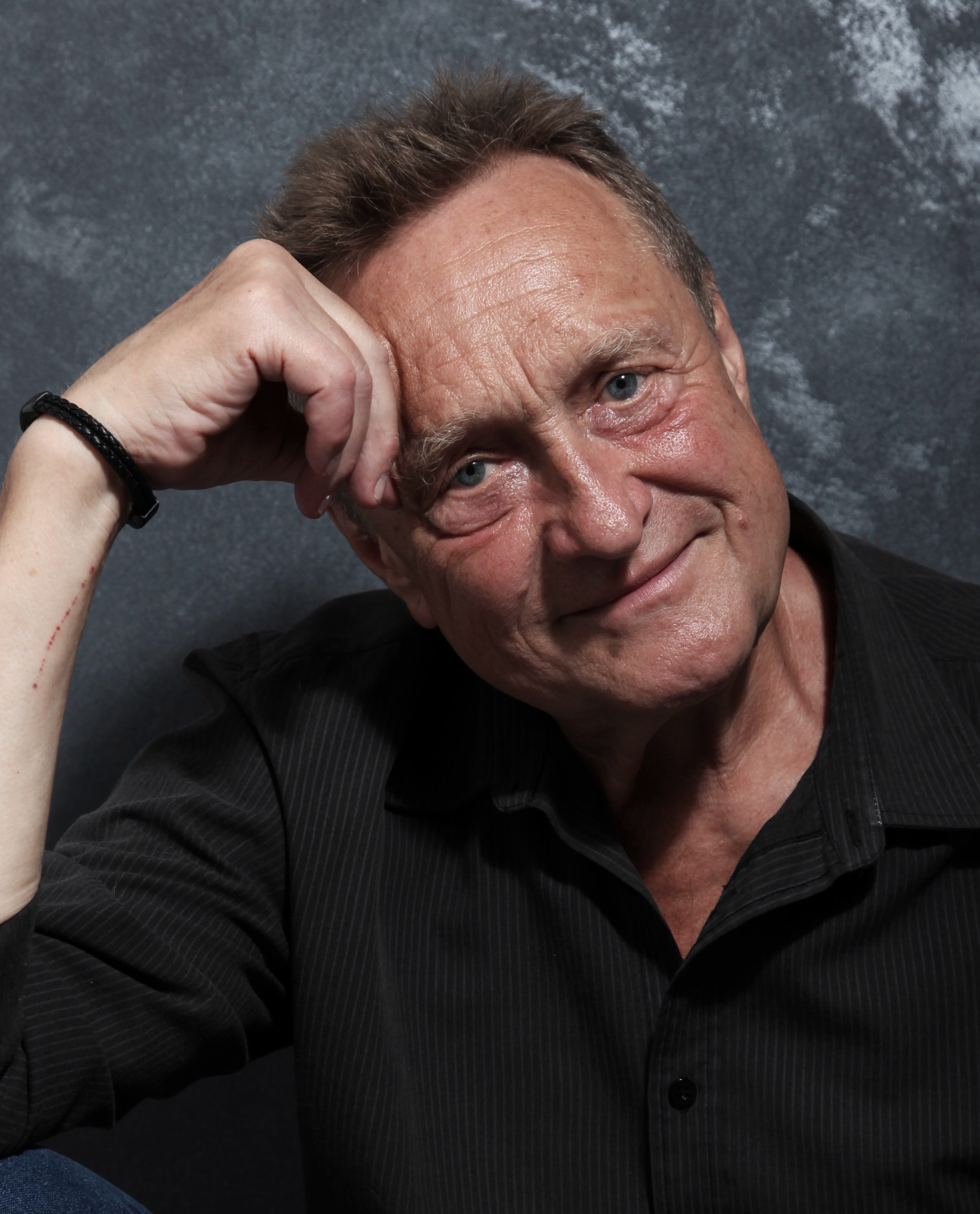
- Paulovič in 2023
- Born: 7 November 1952; Prašice, Czechoslovakia
- Died: 15 August 2024 (aged 71); Chorvátsky Grob, Slovakia
- Education: Academy of Performing Arts in Bratislava
- Occupation: Actor
- Years active: 1970–2023

Ľubomír Paulovič (7 November 1952 – 15 August 2024) was a Slovak actor.

== Early life and career ==
Ľubomír Paulovič was born on 7 November 1952 in the village of Prašice, nearby the town of Topoľčany. He started acting already as a child. His first role was the prince in the fairy tale movie Radúz and Mahulena. He studied acting at the Academy of Performing Arts in Bratislava, graduating in 1978. Following graduation he became a member of the Slovenské komorné divadlo theatre in Martin. In 1984 he moved to the Slovak National Theatre, where he led the drama section until 1996. After his departure from the Slovak National Theatre, he was active at the Jozef Gregor-Tajovský theatre in Zvolen.

Paulovič was very active as a television and film actor. Over the course of his career, he starred in over 150 television movies as well as a number of television series and about 45 films. He frequently cooperated with the director Juraj Jakubisko throughout his career.

Between 2006 and 2010, Paulovič was the mayor of his home village of Prašice.

== Personal life and death ==
Paulovič was married twice and had three daughters: Veronika, who also went on to become an actress, and Tereza from his first marriage and Dominika from the second marriage.

Paulovič died from heart failure at his home in Chorvátsky Grob, on 15 August 2024, at the age of 71. His death was confirmed by his partner, the photographer Lolla Fukari.

== Filmography ==
- 1970: Radúz and Mahulena (prince)
- 1978: Já jsem stěna smrti (Milan)
- 1979: Hra na telo (Filip)
- 1980: Karline manželstvá (bass guitarist)
- 1981: Noční jazdci (Ondro Krtinec)
- 1981: Father (Tóno Harant)
- 1981: Na baňu klopajú (Juro)
- 1981: Vták nociar (guitarist)
- 1982: She Grazed Horses on Concrete (Štefan)
- 1982: The Salt Prince (Prince Kazimír)
- 1983: Letný strom radosti (father Jozef)
- 1983: Radikální řez (Weiner)
- 1984: Právom Lásky (Juraj)
- 1984: V bludisku pamäti (Mikuš)
- 1986: Alžbetin dvor (Lukáš Abram)
- 1987: Hody (Milan)
- 1989: Rabaka (captain Stašo)
- 1991: Gemini (Bosna's father)
- 1992: It's Better to Be Wealthy and Healthy Than Poor and Ill (Viliam)
- 1994: Na krásnom modrom Dunaji (Australian man)
- 1995: … kone na betóne (Štefan)
- 1997: The Peacemaker (Pockman)
- 2003: It Will Stay Between Us (interpreter's boyfriend)
- 2005: Konečná stanica (sailor)
- 2006: Ábelov čierny pes
- 2008: Panelák
- 2009: Soul at Peace
- 2009: Keby bolo keby
- 2009: Nedodržaný sľub
- 2009: Mŕtvola musí zomrieť
- 2010: Legenda o lietajúcom Cypriánovi
- 2010: Kajínek
- 2012–2013: Pod povrchom (Miloslav Rešetka/Max Weber)
- 2013: Klan
- 2015: Divoké kone (Boris Baniak)
- 2019–2021: Delukse
- 2021: Najhorší týždeň môjho života (Igor Mišík)
- 2023: Perinbaba: Two Realms
