= Jan Jirásek =

Czech composer (born 1955)

Jan Jirásek (born 1955 in Rychnov nad Kněžnou) is a Czech composer.

Czech composer Jan Jirásek studied composition with Prof. Zdenek Zouhar at the Janáček Academy of Musical Art in Brno (JAMU). He worked as music editor and producer at the Czech Radio. He was awarded prestigious film music prize The Czech Lion Award for the film Wild Flowers by F. A. Brabec and for the film An ambiguous report about the end of the world by Slovak director Juraj Jakubisko.
