= Wild Flowers (2000 film) =

Kytice Wild Flowers
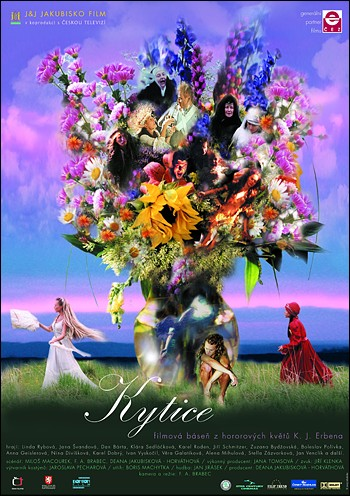
- Directed by: F. A. Brabec
- Written by: F. A. Brabec; Miloš Macourek; Deana Jakubisková-Horváthová
- Based on: Kytice by Karel Jaromír Erben
- Produced by: Deana Jakubisková-Horváthová
- Cinematography: F. A. Brabec
- Edited by: Boris Machytka
- Music by: Jan Jirásek
- Distributed by: Bontonfilm
- Release date: 7 December 2000
- Running time: 81 minutes
- Country: Czech Republic
- Language: Czech

Wild Flowers (Czech: Kytice) is a Czech drama film released in 2000. It was directed by F. A. Brabec and based on seven of thirteen poems from Kytice, a collection of ballads by Karel Jaromír Erben. While relatively successful commercially, the film was criticized for its crude literalism of depiction.

== Plot ==
The film narrates seven stories inspired by Erben's poems, with most of the dialogue taken directly from his works and depicted visually as happening from spring to winter.

Serving as a prologue, Wild Flowers depict children mourning their deceased mother whose soul is suggested to have reincarnated into flowers covering her grave.

The Water Goblin depicts a maiden stolen from her mother by a water creature who makes her his bride underwater. After having a child together, the goblin allows the maiden to visit her mother, but makes her leave their child with him to secure her return. Despite her pleas, the mother forbids the maiden to return eventually, resulting in the goblin killing their baby out of anguish.

In The Spectre's Bride, a young woman is praying for her lover to return to her from war. To her surprise, the man does appear, prompting her to set out to his home in the middle of the night. The woman soon realizes her lover is undead as he drags her to a cemetery. Hiding in a chapel, the woman saves herself with prayers, withstanding the undead man's attacks until sunrise.

The Noonday Witch tells the story of a mother who, frustrated with her constantly crying and ill-behaved son, scares him by calling on a noonday witch—a monster who snatches children—to take him away. Much to her horror, the witch really appears. As the desperate mother tries to protect her child from being taken, she smothers him to death.

In The Golden Spinning Wheel, a young king falls in love with Dornička, a beautiful maiden, and asks her stepmother for her hand. On their way to the castle, Dornička's stepmother and stepsister murder and dismember the girl, and the stepsister poses as Dornička. An old wise man and his son find Dornička's remains in the forest and trick the women into giving them her limbs in exchange for a golden spinning wheel. The two then revive Dornička just as the king realizes his bride is not who she claims due to the spinning wheel singing the truth when being used. The king reunites with his love and the two women are ousted and killed by wolves in the forest.

The Daughter's Curse tells a story of a young woman who killed her baby born out of wedlock. When confronted by her mother just before being executed, the daughter curses her lover, and then her mother for giving her too much freedom which led her to grow up spoiled and selfish.

The last story, The Christmas Day, follows two girls, Hana and Marie, as they leave an old woman and their housework to venture out to a frozen lake, confident to see visions of the future in its icy waters. While Hana is excited to see a vision of her lover marrying her, Marie is horrified to see a funeral ceremony. At the same time, the old woman sits down for a prayer in a church, and dies.

== Accolades ==
- (Czech Republic) Czech Lion 2000
  - Best Cinematography
  - Best Music
  - Best Sound Editing
  - Best Poster
- (United States) Rhode Island International Film Festival 2002
  - Grand Prize for Best Foreign Film
- (United States) Wine Country Film Festival 2001
  - Best Cinematography
- (Poland) Camerimage 2001
  - Winner of World Panorama (Audience Competition)
