= Ondřej Soukup =

Czech musician and composer (born 1951)

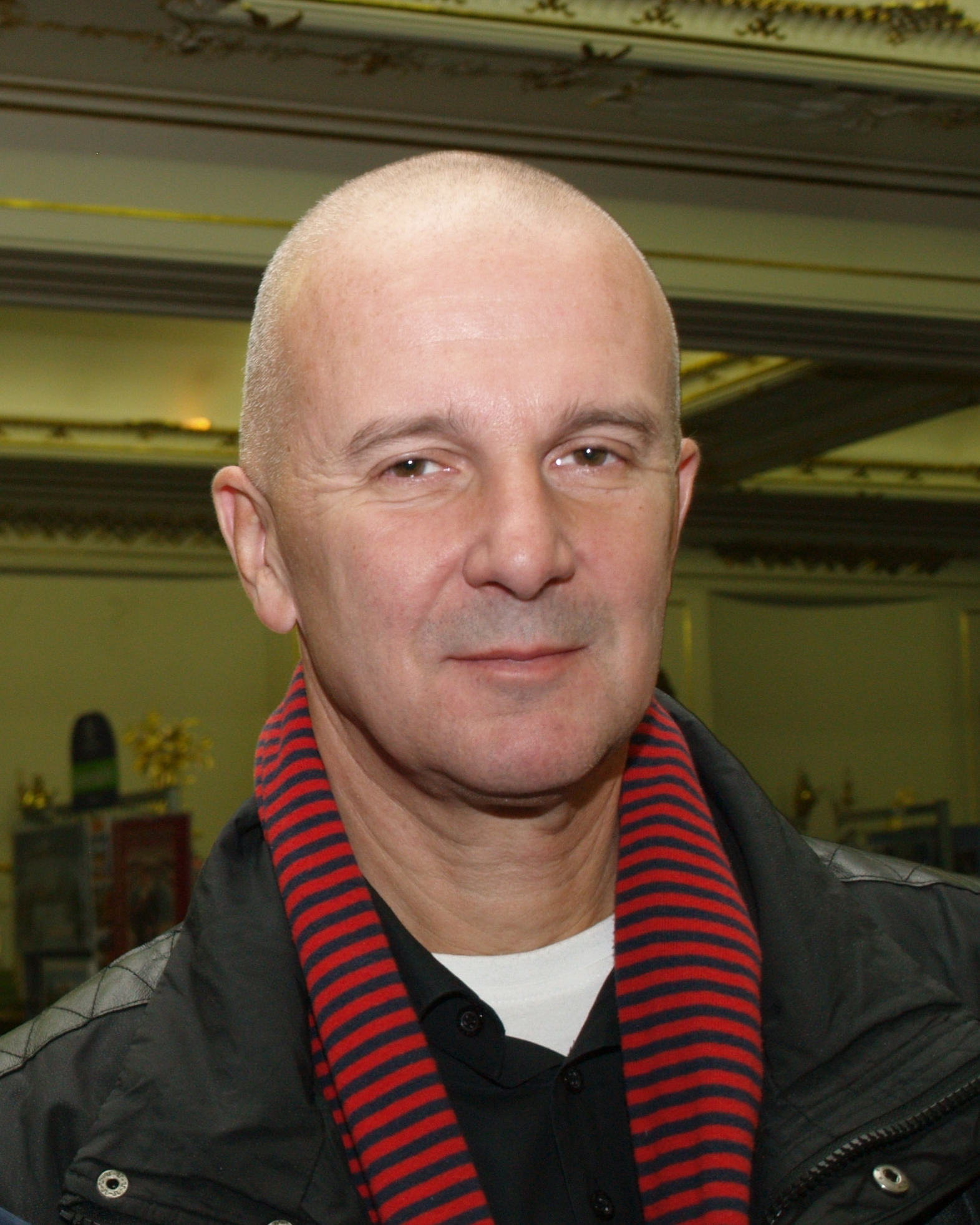
- Soukup in 2009
- Born: 2 May 1951 (age 75); Prague, Czechoslovakia
- Education: Prague Conservatory
- Occupations: Musician; composer; producer
- Spouse(s): Gabriela Osvaldová; Lucia Šoralová (2017–present)
- Children: 3
- Website: ondrejsoukup.com

Ondřej Soukup (born 2 May 1951) is a Czech musician and composer. He has written soundtracks for over twenty feature films, including Jan Svěrák's Kolya, an Academy Award-winner for best foreign film in 1997, and Dark Blue World, for which Soukup received his second Czech Lion award for best soundtrack, in 2001. He was also a jury member for the talent show Česko hledá SuperStar.

== Career ==
Soukup graduated from the Prague Conservatory in 1975, then played bass in various jazz and pop bands, including Pražský výběr and Pavel Fořt's group Labyrint. In the early 1980s, Soukup began playing with Karel Gott and also composed and arranged music of his own. He later became a full-time composer and also produced records for other artists.

In 1983, Soukup wrote music for his first feature film, Druhý tah pěšcem. Since then, he has scored twenty more productions, including the Oscar-winning Kolya, directed by Jan Svěrák, in 1996. In 1998, he won a Czech Lion award for best composition in Juraj Jakubisko's An Ambiguous Report About the End of the World. Three years later, he won another Czech Lion for music in Jan Svěrák's film Dark Blue World.

Soukup has also written pop music for various artists, often together with his ex-wife, lyricist Gabriela Osvaldová. The duo's first collaboration was the 1989 song "Miss Moscow", written for Jiří Korn. They also worked with singer Lucie Bílá on her second studio album, 1992's Missariel, which went on to win five Anděl Awards.

In 2000, Soukup wrote his first musical, Johanka z Arku, to which Gabriela Osvaldová penned the lyrics. In 2015, he composed music for the Russian ice show Masha and the Bear, based on the cartoon of the same name.

Additionally, he has served as a member of the jury on the reality talent shows Česko hledá SuperStar and X Factor.

== Personal life ==
Soukup has one son with Gabriela Osvaldová, composer František Soukup. In 2017, he married Slovak singer Lucia Šoralová, with whom he has a son and a daughter.

== Partial list of scores ==
- Druhý tah pěšcem (1983)
- Bony a klid (1988)
- Accumulator 1 (1994)
- Kolya (1996)
- An Ambiguous Report About the End of the World (1998)
- Johanka z Arku (2000 – musical)
- Dark Blue World (2001)
- Empties (2007)
- Bony a klid II (2014)
- Masha and the Bear (2015 – ice show)
- The Devil's Mistress (2016)
