= Nights of Cabiria =

1957 film by Federico Fellini

- Theatrical release poster
- Italian: Le notti di Cabiria
- Directed by: Federico Fellini
- Screenplay by: Federico Fellini; Ennio Flaiano; Tullio Pinelli; Pier Paolo Pasolini
- Story by: Federico Fellini
- Produced by: Dino De Laurentiis
- Starring: Giulietta Masina; François Périer; Franca Marzi; Dorian Gray; Amedeo Nazzari
- Cinematography: Aldo Tonti; Otello Martelli
- Edited by: Leo Catozzo
- Music by: Nino Rota
- Distributed by: Paramount Pictures (Italy); Les Films Marceau (France)
- Release dates: 10 May 1957 (Cannes); 27 May 1957 (Italy); 16 October 1957 (France)
- Running time: 118 minutes
- Countries: Italy; France
- Language: Italian
- Box office: $770,278

Nights of Cabiria (Italian: Le notti di Cabiria) is a 1957 tragicomedy film co-written and directed by Federico Fellini. The film features Giulietta Masina as Cabiria, a kind-hearted prostitute living in Rome and her adventures and misfortunes trying to find happiness. The cast also features François Périer and Amedeo Nazzari. The film is based on a story by Fellini, who expanded it into a screenplay along with his co-writers Ennio Flaiano, Tullio Pinelli and Pier Paolo Pasolini.

In addition to the Best Actress Award at the Cannes Film Festival for Giulietta Masina, Nights of Cabiria won the 1958 Academy Award for Best Foreign Language Film. This marked the second consecutive year that both Italy and Fellini won the award, following the previous year's win for La Strada, which also featured Masina.

In 2008, the film was included on the Italian Ministry of Cultural Heritage’s 100 Italian films to be saved, a list of 100 films that "have changed the collective memory of the country between 1942 and 1978". The film is widely considered to be one of Fellini's best works, as well as one of the greatest films of 1957, of the 1950s, of the 20th century and one of the best Italian films of all time. Masina's performance is widely regarded as one of the finest female performances in movie history.

== Plot ==
Prostitute Cabiria and her lover Giorgio chase each other through a field and up to the bank of a river. Oblivious to Giorgio's criminal intentions, Cabiria stands close to the edge of the water, and he pushes her into the river and runs off with her purse and money. Her shouts for help are heard by a young boy playing nearby, and he alerts some other children and adults who rescue her from drowning.

Cabiria returns to her small home, but Giorgio has disappeared. She is bitter, and when her best friend and neighbor, Wanda, tries to help her get over him, Cabiria shoos her away and remains disgruntled. One night, she is outside an upscale nightclub in town and witnesses a loud spat between famous movie star Alberto Lazzari and his girlfriend. The irritated Lazzari takes the star-struck Cabiria to another club where they dance the mambo, before returning to the movie star's house, where Cabiria is astounded by its opulence. The two share an affectionate moment in Lazzari's bedroom, but are interrupted by the intrusion of Lazzari's girlfriend. Cabiria is shunted into the bathroom, and ends up watching through the keyhole of its door as Lazzari and his girlfriend reconcile. She leaves quietly in the morning.

The following day, a church procession passes by the street where Cabiria and her friends work. As the others mock the Church, Cabiria is drawn to the procession. Just as she is about to join it, a man driving a truck pulls up and offers her a ride, but leaves her lost and annoyed. She sees a man giving food and essentials to some poor people living in caves. She has never seen this man before, but she is both impressed and confused by his charity toward others.

The following day, Cabiria and some of her friends attend a pilgrimage, where she pleads with the Virgin Mary for a better life. After the procession ends, Cabiria expresses sadness at the fact that her friends seem to have not changed anything about their lives.

Cabiria goes to a magic show, and the magician drags her up on stage and hypnotizes her. As the audience laugh, she acts out her desires to be married and live a happy life. Furious at having been taken advantage of for the audience's amusement, she leaves in a huff. Outside the theatre, a man named Oscar is waiting to talk to her. He was in the audience, and he says he agrees with her that it was not right for everyone to laugh, but believes that fate has brought them together. They go for a drink, and at first she is cautious and suspicious, but after several meetings she falls deeply in love with him; they are to be married after only a few weeks. Cabiria is delighted and sells her home and takes out all her money from the bank. The sum of more than 700,000 lire in cash represents her dowry, and when she shows it to Oscar in a restaurant, he advises her to keep it in the purse. However, during a walk in a wooded area, on a cliff overlooking a lake, (Note: Scenes were shot on location at Lake Bracciano near Rome.) Oscar becomes distant and starts acting nervous. Cabiria realizes that, just like her earlier lover, Oscar intends to steal her money. She throws her purse at his feet, sobbing in convulsions on the ground and begging for him to kill her as he takes the money and abandons her.

She later picks herself up and stumbles out of the wood in tears. As Cabiria walks the road back to town, she encounters a group of young people riding scooters, playing music, and dancing. They happily form an impromptu parade around her until she begins to smile, as a single black-mascara tear falls down her face.

== Cast ==
- Giulietta Masina as Cabiria Ceccarelli
- François Périer as Oscar D'Onofrio
- Franca Marzi as Wanda
- Dorian Gray as Jessy
- Aldo Silvani as the wizard
- Ennio Girolami Amleto the pimp
- Amedeo Nazzari as Alberto Lazzari
- Franco Fabrizi as Giorgio (uncredited)

== Production ==
The name Cabiria is borrowed from the 1914 Italian film Cabiria, while the character of Cabiria herself is taken from a brief scene in Fellini's earlier film, The White Sheik. It was Masina's performance in that earlier film that inspired Fellini to make Nights of Cabiria. However, no one in Italy was willing to finance a film which featured prostitutes as heroines. Finally, Dino de Laurentiis agreed to put up the money. Fellini based some of the characters on a prostitute whom he had met while filming Il Bidone. For authenticity, he had Pier Paolo Pasolini, known for his familiarity with Rome's criminal underworld, help with the dialogue.

Nights of Cabiria was filmed in many areas around Italy, including Acilia, Castel Gandolfo, Cinecittà, Santuario della Madonna del Divino Amore, Porta Maggiore, the Baths of Caracalla and the Tiber River.

== Reception ==
=== Critical response ===
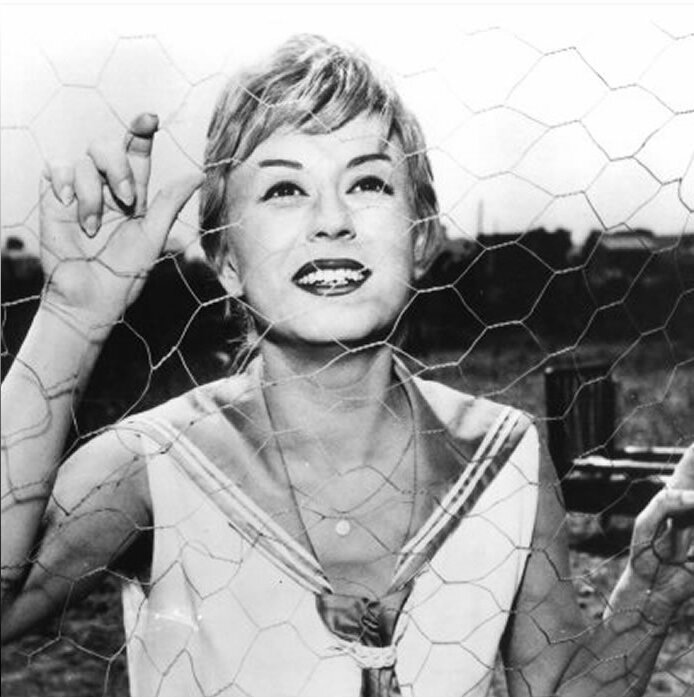
Giulietta Masina's performance as the title character received universal acclaim from both critics and audiences and won her the Cannes Best Actress prize. Lauded for her physical comedy, emotional depth, vulnerability, resilience and brassiness, her performance is considered one of the greatest by an actress in movie history.

Upon its original 1957 release, French director François Truffaut thought Cabiria was Fellini's best film to date. The film ranked third on Cahiers du Cinéma's "Top 10 Films of the Year List" in 1957.

The New York Times critic Bosley Crowther gave the film a mixed review: "Like La Strada and several other of the post-war Italian neo-realistic films, this one is aimed more surely toward the development of a theme than a plot. Its interest is not so much the conflicts that occur in the life of the heroine as the deep, underlying implications of human pathos that the pattern of her life shows...But there are two weaknesses in Cabiria. It has a sordid atmosphere and there is something elusive and insufficient about the character of the heroine. Her get-up is weird and illogical for the milieu in which she lives and her farcical mannerisms clash with the ugly realism of the theme."

Forty years later, the Times carried a new review by Crowther's successor, Janet Maslin. She called the film "a cinematic masterpiece", and added that the final shot of Cabiria is worth more than "all the fire-breathing blockbusters Hollywood has to offer."

Film critic Roger Ebert reviewed mainly the plot and Fellini's background: "Fellini's roots as a filmmaker are in the postwar Italian Neorealist movement (he worked for Rossellini on Rome, Open City in 1945), and his early films have a grittiness that is gradually replaced by the dazzling phantasms of the later ones. Nights of Cabiria is transitional; it points toward the visual freedom of La Dolce Vita while still remaining attentive to the real world of postwar Rome. The scene involving the good samaritan provides a framework to show people living in city caves and under bridges, but even more touching is the scene where Cabiria turns over the keys of her house to the large and desperately poor family that has purchased it." He gave the film four stars out of four and included it in his Great Movies list.

In 1998, the film was re-released, newly restored and including a crucial 7-minute sequence (with the man giving food to the poor people living in caves) that censors had cut after the premiere. The Village Voice ranked Nights of Cabiria at number 112 in its Top 250 "Best Films of the Century" list in 1999, based on a poll of critics.

In January 2002, the film (along with La Strada) was included on the National Society of Film Critics' list of the "Top 100 Essential Films of All Time". The film was included at number 87 on BBC's 2018 list of "The 100 Greatest Foreign-Language Films", voted by 209 film critics from 43 countries around the world.

The review aggregator Rotten Tomatoes reported that 100% of critics gave the film a positive review, based on 41 reviews, and an average rating of 9.5/10. The consensus states: "Giulietta Masina is remarkable as a chronically unfortunate wretch with an indomitable spirit in Federico Fellini's unrelentingly bleak – yet ultimately uplifting – odyssey through heartbreak."

== Awards ==
Wins

- Cannes Film Festival: Best Actress, Giulietta Masina; OCIC Award – Special Mention, Federico Fellini; 1957.
- David di Donatello Awards, Italy: David, Best Director, Federico Fellini; Best Production, Dino De Laurentiis; 1957.
- San Sebastián International Film Festival: Zulueta Prize, Best Actress, Giulietta Masina; 1957.
- Academy Awards: Oscar, Best Foreign Language Film, Italy; 1957. Recipients- Federico Fellini & Dino De Laurentiis
- Italian National Syndicate of Film Journalists: Silver Ribbon, Best Actress, Giulietta Masina; Best Director, Federico Fellini; Best Producer, Dino De Laurentiis; Best Supporting Actress, Franca Marzi; 1958.
- Sant Jordi Awards, Barcelona, Spain: Best Foreign Actress, Giulietta Masina; Best Foreign Director, Federico Fellini; Best Foreign Film, Federico Fellini; Best Foreign Screenplay, Ennio Flaiano, Tullio Pinelli and Pier Paolo Pasolini; 1959.
- Cinema Writers Circle Awards, Spain: CEC Award, Best Foreign Film, Italy; 1959.

== Legacy ==
The American musical Sweet Charity (and its film adaptation) is based on Fellini's screenplay.

== See also ==
- List of Italian films of 1957
- List of submissions to the 30th Academy Awards for Best Foreign Language Film
- List of Italian submissions for the Academy Award for Best Foreign Language Film
