= Gabriela Osvaldová =

Czech actress and lyricist (born 1953)

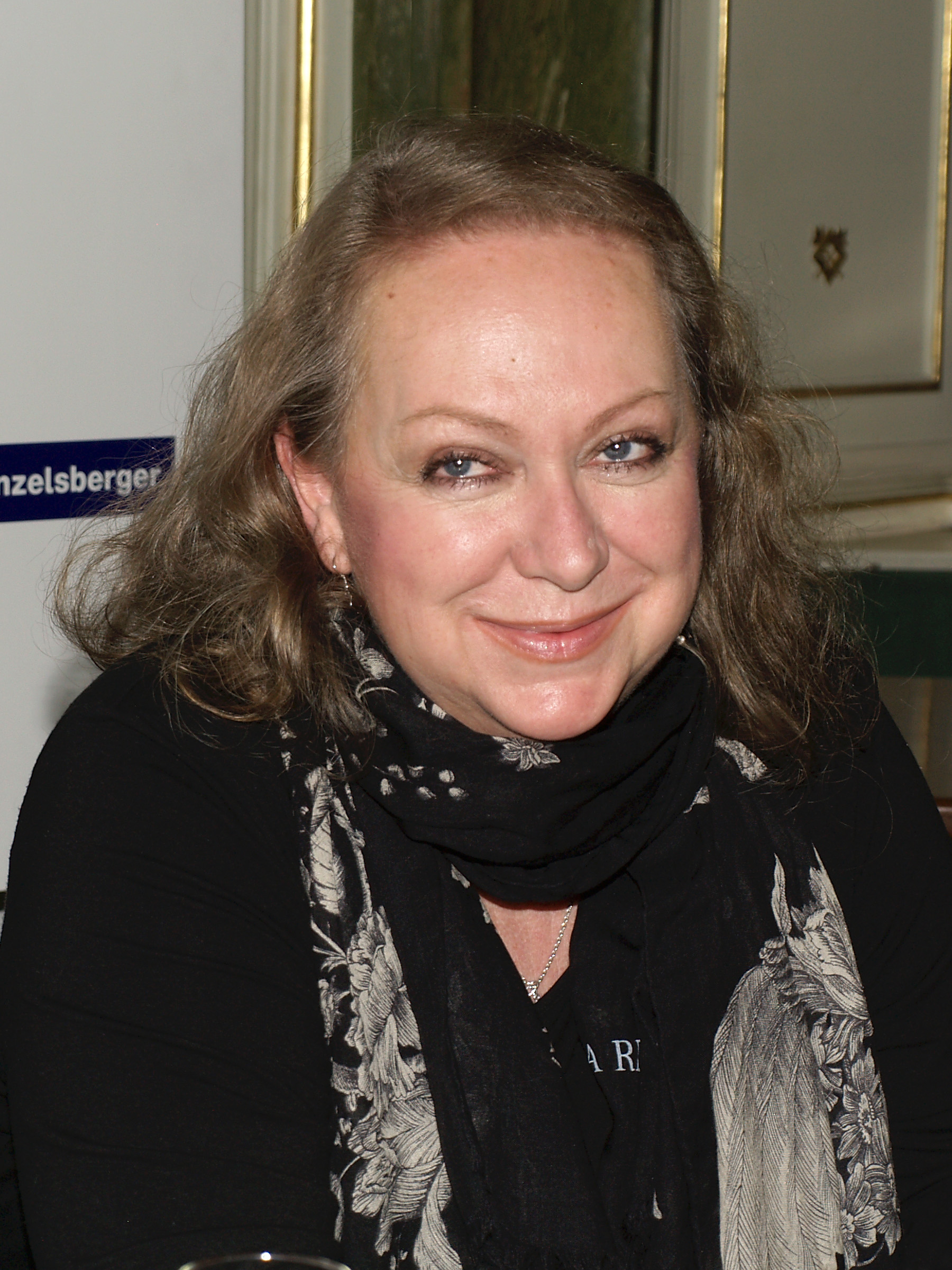
- Born: 25 July 1953 (age 72); Prague, Czechoslovakia
- Occupations: Actress, lyricist
- Years active: 1973–present
- Spouse: Ondřej Soukup (before 2006)

Gabriela Osvaldová (born 25 July 1953 in Prague), also known as Gábina Osvaldová, is a Czech actress and lyricist, best known for her work in Marecek, Pass Me the Pen! (1976). She has been a judge on the reality competition show Česko hledá SuperStar since 2004.
