= Bathory (film) =

2008 historical drama film

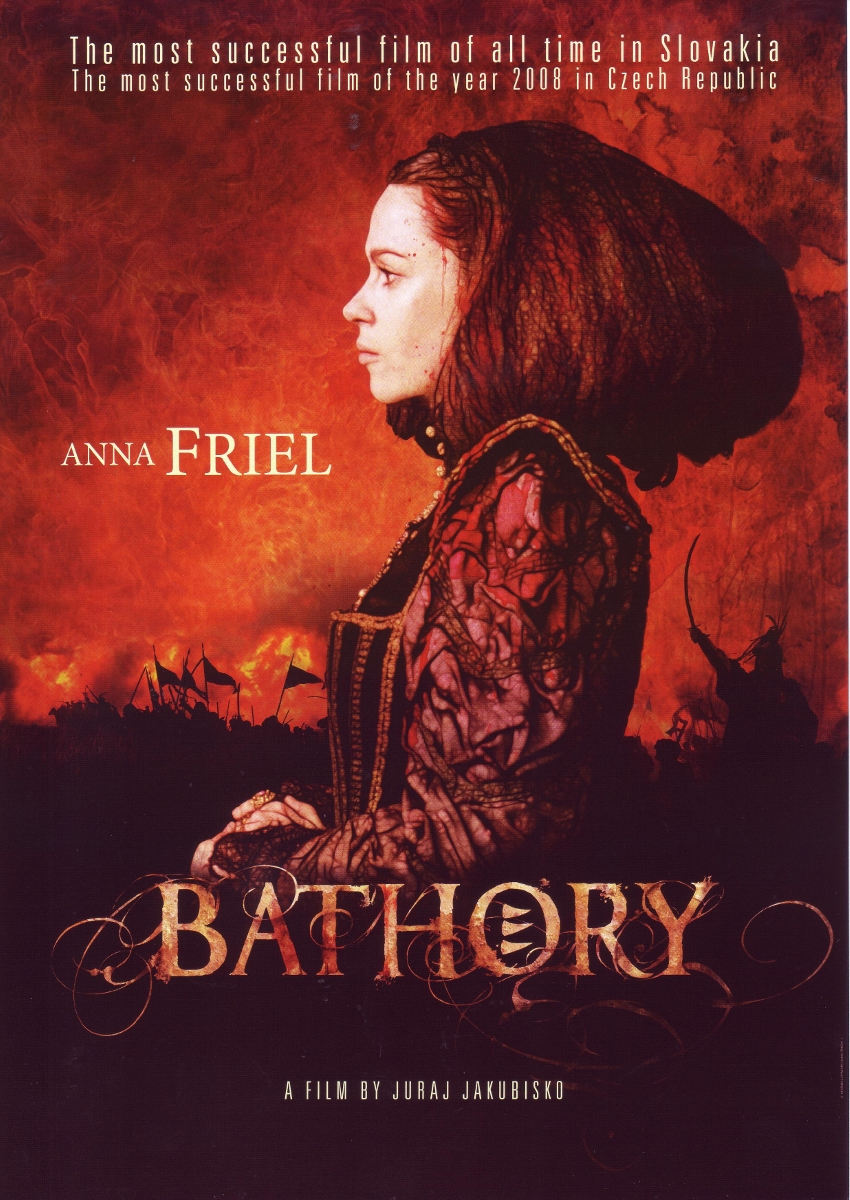
- Theatrical release poster
- Directed by: Juraj Jakubisko
- Written by: John Paul Chapple; Juraj Jakubisko
- Produced by: Deana Horváthová; Mike Downey; Thom Mount; Zorana Piggott; Kevan Van Thompson
- Starring: Anna Friel; Karel Roden; Hans Matheson; Vincent Regan; Franco Nero; Deana Horváthová
- Cinematography: F. A. Brabec; Ján Duris
- Edited by: Chris Blunden
- Music by: Simon Boswell
- Production companies: Jakubisko Films; Mist Entertainment
- Distributed by: Tatrafilm (Slovakia); Bontonfilm (Czech Republic); Budapest Film (Hungary); Metrodome (UK)
- Release date: 10 July 2008
- Running time: 140 minutes
- Countries: Slovakia; Czech Republic; Hungary; United Kingdom
- Language: English
- Budget: €10 million
- Box office: $7,005,528

Bathory (also released as Bathory: Countess of Blood) is a 2008 historical drama written and directed by Juraj Jakubisko. Filming began in December 2005, and the film was released in July 2008. It was Jakubisko's first English-language film and an international co-production between the cinemas of Slovakia, the Czech Republic, Hungary, and the United Kingdom.

== Plot ==
The film is based on the story of Erzsébet Bathory, a Hungarian countess in the 16th and 17th centuries. Her story takes place in a part of the Kingdom of Hungary that is now Slovakia. In this retelling, the Countess is a healer who conducts medical experiments and rudimentary autopsies in a "hospital" beneath her castle. She forms a relationship with a reputed witch, Darvulia, who saves her from poisoning. The witch promises Erzsebet a son and eternal beauty. In return, Erzsebet must sacrifice both love and her reputation. Darvulia becomes Erzsebet's companion. Meanwhile, maidens in the area have been dying of seemingly unrelated causes, and Erzsebet is seen bathing in a large tub of red liquid as the girls' now-mutilated corpses are buried nearby. Two monks later conclude that the water is not blood but is simply colored red by herbs.

After her husband Ferenc Nádasdy's death, Erzsébet quarrels with his scheming friend György Thurzó, who tries to proposition her at her husband's funeral. Thurzo's lover, who is gifted with herbs, offers to help him get revenge for the rejection. Soon afterward, Erzsebet begins to have surreal visions and episodes. In one of these, she stabs a woman to death with scissors. Afterwards, she confesses to Darvulia that she can no longer tell dream from reality. Darvulia discovers that someone has been placing hallucinogenic mushrooms in Erzsébet's drinks; Erzsébet cannot remember clearly and believes Darvulia responsible. She has the woman thrown out. Thurzó and his wife then capture Darvulia and torture her, cutting out her tongue. Before she dies, she writes Thurzó's name in blood on her cell wall. Erzsébet swears vengeance on him.

Thurzó enlists Erzsébet's sons-in-law and other allies to prosecute her for witchcraft. When their plans repeatedly fail, they nonetheless capture the Countess and torture members of her household to try to obtain incriminating information. The servants are then executed for their alleged crimes, and Erzsébet is imprisoned. Despairing over her separation from her son, she lies on her bed and begins to sing a hymn; the flames from her candles rise and engulf her in flames. Upon hearing of her death, Thurzo concedes that she has once again made the move he least expected, as when they once played chess together, and admits that he has always loved her.

== Cast ==
- Anna Friel as Countess Elizabeth Báthory
- Karel Roden as György Thurzó
- Vincent Regan as Ferenc Nádasdy
- Hans Matheson as Merisi / Caravaggio
- Franco Nero as King Mathias II of Hungary
- Deana Jakubisková-Horváthová as Darvulia
- Bolek Polívka as Monk Peter
- Antony Byrne as Pastor Ponicky
- Jiří Mádl as Neophyte Cyril
- Lucie Vondráčková as Lucia
- Marek Majeský as Gabriel Bathory
- Vincenzo Nicoli as Zsigmond Bathory
- Míra Nosek - Miklós Zrínyi
- Marek Vašut - Gabriel Bethlen
- Hana Vagnerová as Margita
- Jana Oľhová as Dora
- Monika Hilmerová as Erzsébet Czobor
- Michaela Drotárová as Erika
- Sandra Pogodová as Sára

== Production ==
Juraj Jakubisko declared in an interview:

I decided to make this film because Countess Elizabeth Báthory is the most famous Hungarian aristocrat that lived in what is Slovakia today. She is so well known that she is also included in the Guinness Book of World Records as the world's most prolific mass murderer. She supposedly murdered 650 people during her lifetime. The film is essentially a mix of genres. What is interesting about this story is that it doesn't even lack humour and it is also a kind of crime story as there are two monks investigating what is actually going on with Báthory. But there is also political intrigue, and the drama of an intelligent woman too weak to face all the odds she had to face... It is the story of a woman, Elizabeth Bathory, who, in short, was unfortunate to have been born at the wrong time in history.

=== Casting ===
In late January 2006, Famke Janssen was announced to play Báthory, and her photos with Jakubisko showed up in the media. Her first appearance was planned for 6 March 2006. Meanwhile other sequences (those not involving her) were being shot. Around 8 March 2006, news agencies reported that Janssen had been replaced by the English actress Anna Friel.

=== Financing and production companies ===
The budget of 10 million EUR (around 15 million USD) makes it the most expensive Slovak film and second most expensive Czech film. The film is a joint effort of Slovak, Czech, British, and Hungarian production companies: Jakubisko Film Slovakia s.r.o. (SK), Eurofilm Studio KFT (HU), Jakubisko Film, s.r.o. (CZ), Lunar Films Ltd (UK) and Concorde Film Trust (HU) with additional government funding provided by Eurimages (EU), the Ministry of Culture of the Slovak Republic (SK), and Czech Film Fund (CZ).

== Reception ==
Variety criticized the lack of character development in the film saying "Jakubisko loses sight of the countess herself" and Friel "fails to make the audience care about her fate." Screen Daily had similar criticisms saying "A stronger cast might have given the characters some weight, but Anna Friel’s shoulders are ultimately too frail." The review also called the film "disjointed."

== Preceding film ==
The Bathory story was dramatized in an earlier film, 1973's Immoral Tales, by Walerian Borowczyk, in which it is the third of four vignettes (preceded by "The Tides", based on a story by André Pieyre de Mandiargues, and "Thérèse the Philosopher", a 1748 pornographic novel, and followed by a visit by Lucrezia Borgia to her father Pope Alexander VI in 1498).
