= Talk It Out =

Talk It Out With Jodi Leib is an entertainment program in the nature of on-going special variety, news, music, or comedy featuring celebrity interviews, documentary biographies, live performance, music videos, movies, audience interactivity, and website social networking broadcast over television, satellite, internet, and audio/video media.

== Inception ==
Talk It Out began after the Columbine high school massacre as a way to create dialogue and community through music and television.

Dedicated to exposing the positive and inspiring leadership qualities at the core of today's popular artists, Jodi Leib began hosting Talk It Out on local cable in Los Angeles and Detroit on a regular basis soon after September 11, 2001.

Programs with up-and-coming artist began airing on a regular basis, which led to an online music magazine featuring a series of print interviews with rising stars and local bands.

== Guests ==
Jodi Leib hosted Talk It Out sessions with the following artists, musicians, and activists:

- The Black Eyed Peas
- Breaking Benjamin
- Diana
- Hiromi
- Hope
- Indigo Girls
- Janeane Garofalo
- The High Strung
- The Knives
- J. Knox
- Lunarclick
- Stephanie Mardell and Megan Brooks
- Ladell McLin
- Sterling Mire
- Moby
- Randy Nerve
- Royal Crown Revue
- Gloria Steinem
- L. E. Stokes
- Teal
- Tyrese
- The Warlocks
- Brittney Westover
- The Whips
- Joselyn Wilkinson

== Work with the Black Eyed Peas ==
In 2004, Jodi Leib hosted and produced the episode "Talk It Out with Jodi Leib: On Tour with the Black Eyed Peas", which helped the band launch their breakthrough album Elephunk that featured will.i.am, apl.de.ap, Taboo, and Fergie. The television program ran in Los Angeles, Philadelphia, and Detroit. The show also features the music video for Where is the Love?.

== Farm Aid ==
In 2006, Jodi Leib hosted a Farm Aid session with singer-songwriter Danielle Evin. In the interview, Danielle focuses on the importance of healthful nutrition, organic food and the need for more available health food snacks.
