= The Feather Fairy =

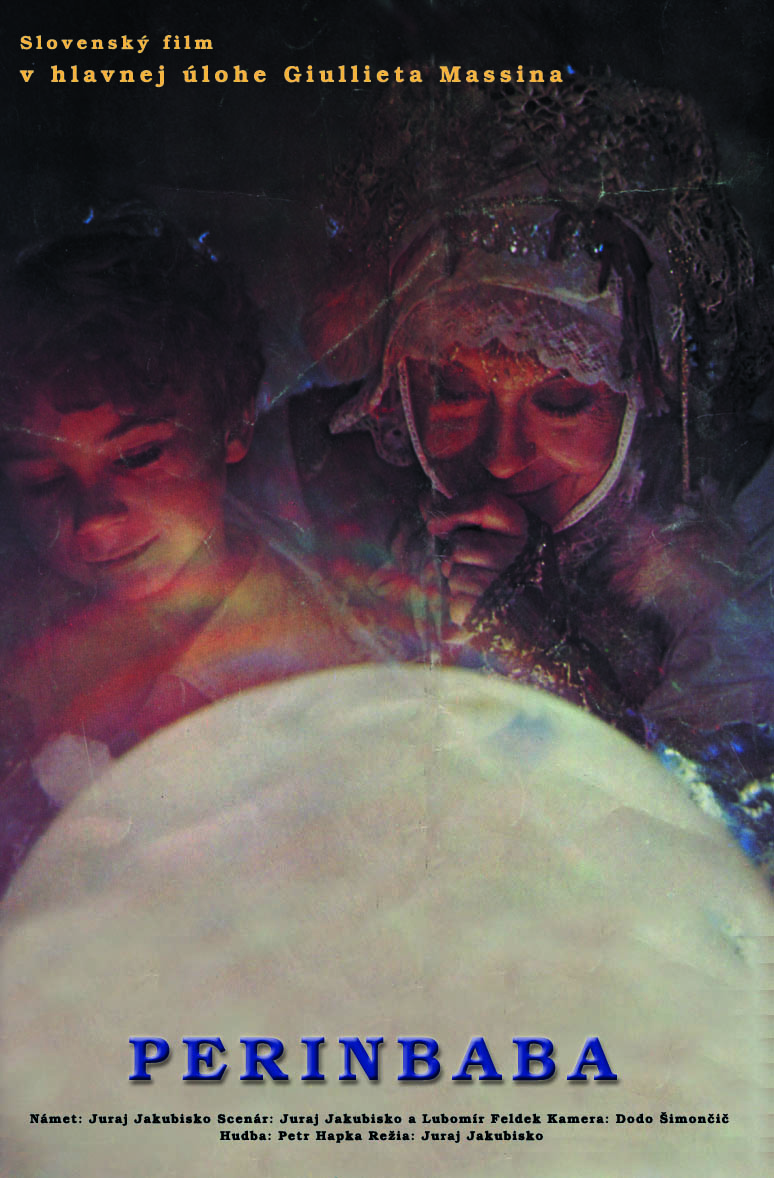
- Directed by: Juraj Jakubisko
- Written by: Brothers Grimm (original); Juraj Jakubisko; Ľubomír Feldek
- Produced by: Slovenská filmová tvorba, Bratislava / Omnia Film, Munich
- Starring: Giulietta Masina; Valerie Kaplanová; Soňa Valentová; Tobias Hoesl
- Music by: Petr Hapka
- Release date: 1985
- Running time: 95 minutes
- Countries: West Germany; Czechoslovakia
- Language: Slovak

The Feather Fairy (Slovak: Perinbaba) is a 1985 Slovak film adaptation of a Brothers Grimm's "Mother Hulda" short story directed by Slovak director Juraj Jakubisko. A fairy tale about an immortal woman who cares for snow and a boy who isn't afraid of death.

== Synopsis ==
A fairy tale not only for children about Jacob, who through his courage, manages to trick death. The film plays with people's never-ending desire for happiness, love and victory over death. Mrs Winter, The Feather Fairy, rules the world and also, being so open-hearted, raises little Jacob, who almost died in an avalanche. Life in the fairytale is perfect: the little boy is immortal, he doesn't get older, and he has everything. Even though his life is perfect, he watches human life through a looking glass. He sees a young girl Alžbetka growing into a young lady, and he desires to be a normal person and live with his love. Jakubisko: “What you do now with the special digital effects we did without them. My friend Federico Fellini persuaded Giulietta Masina to be the Feather Fairy and she brought a spark and lightness to the story.”

== Film Awards ==
- (Czechoslovakia) Zlín Film Festival 1986
  • Special Jury Prize
- (Czechoslovakia) Slovak Film Medal 1986
- (Czechoslovakia) XXIV. Festival of Czech and Slovak Film 1986
  • Prize for art production
- (France) IV. Film Festival for youth Lyon 1986
  • Young Audience Member's Prize for best film
- UNICEF Grand Prix, 1986
- (Socialist Federal Republic of Yugoslavia) Film Festival in Belgrade 1986
  • Audience Prize for best film
- (Italy) XLII.Venice Film Festival 1986
  • Catholic Prize
- (Italy) Venice Film Festival 1986
  • Certificate of Merit RAI II
- (Spain) Gijón International Film Festival 1986
  • Jury Prize for the best special effects
- (Quebec) International Film Festival Rimouski 1988
  • Grand Prize Camerio
- (Argentina) I. International Film Festival for children Buenos Aires 1988
  • Grand Prize

== Premiere screening ==
1 November 1985

== Sequel ==
A sequel called Perinbaba: Two Realms came out in 2023.
