= Juraj Jakubisko =

Slovak film director (1938–2023)

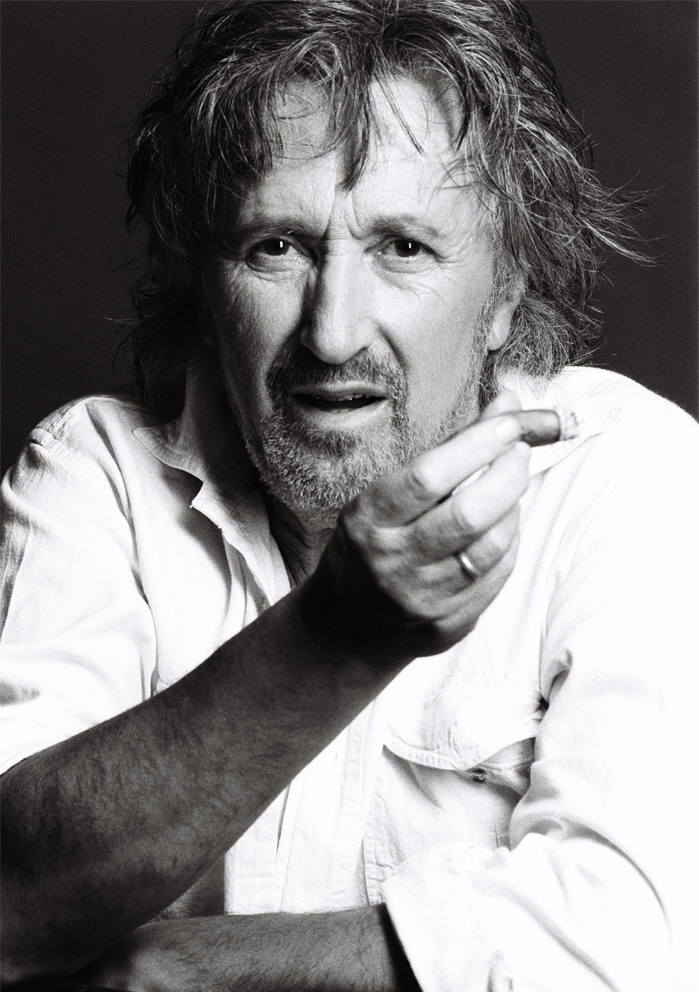
- Jakubisko in 2015
- Born: 30 April 1938; Kojšov, Czechoslovakia
- Died: 24 February 2023 (aged 84); Prague, Czech Republic
- Education: FAMU
- Occupations: Director; writer; cinematographer
- Spouse: Deana Horváthová (m. 1985)
- Children: 2

Juraj Jakubisko (30 April 1938 – 24 February 2023) was a Slovak film director. He directed fifteen feature films, between 1967 and 2008. He often took on the dual role of cinematographer in his films, as well as writing or co-writing the scripts. In 2000 he was named the Best Slovak Director of the 20th century by film critics and journalists. His work is often described as magical realism.

== Career ==
Before entering the film industry, Jakubisko taught still photography at a secondary school for applied arts in Bratislava, and worked for a television company in Košice. In 1960 he moved to Prague where he attended the Film and TV School of the Academy of Performing Arts (FAMU), studying film direction under Václav Wasserman. He graduated in 1965 and began working with Alfréd Radok at the Laterna Magika theatre in Prague. He began winning international acclaim with his experimental short films before making his first feature Crucial Years (Slovak: Kristove roky) in 1967. This film won a FIPRESCI award and a Josef von Sternberg Award in Mannheim, Germany. His next film, Deserters and Pilgrims, won the Little Lion award for young artists at the Venice Film Festival.

Jakubisko's career was heavily impacted by political events in Czechoslovakia, with his work facing censorship in the period following the Soviet-led Warsaw Pact invasion in response to the Prague Spring. During the "normalization" period which followed, he made a few documentaries, but no major feature films. He filmed Three Sacks of Cement and a Live Rooster (Slovak: Tri vrecia cementu a živý kohút) in 1976, but it was not released until 1978.

Jakubisko returned to feature film-making in 1979 with Build a House, Plant a Tree (Slovak: Postav dom, zasaď strom), which was nonetheless banned for its anti-regime messages, but not before it received a positive reception at a film festival in Amsterdam. The success in Amsterdam proved invigorating for Jakubisko's work, leading to a fertile period, culminating in the 1983 epic The Millennial Bee (Slovak: Tisícročná včela). This movie was a huge success, selling out cinemas for many weeks after its release and winning awards at film festivals in Seville and Venice. The film was later named the best film of the 1980s by Czechoslovak journalists.

In 1985, Jakubisko directed a children's film, The Feather Fairy, featuring Giulietta Masina, the wife of Federico Fellini, with whom Jakubisko also had a close friendship. His film Sitting on a Branch, Enjoying Myself, released three months before the end of the communist regime in Czechoslovakia, won Jakubisko more international acclaim, including the Grand Prize at the Moscow International Film Festival in 1990. 1990 also saw the belated release of Jakubisko's surrealist political horror, See You In Hell, My Friends, which had been banned 20 years earlier by communist censors.

Jakubisko and his wife relocated to Prague following the dissolution of Czechoslovakia in 1993, and set up a production company, Jakubisko films. Jakubisko's next feature film was An ambiguous report about the end of the world (1997), a satirical comedy based on the prophecies of Nostradamus. The film won four Czech Lion awards. In 1998 Jakubisko joined the European Film Academy, and was also awarded the Maverick Award by the Taos Talking Pictures Film Festival. In 2000 he was named Best Slovak Director of the 20th century by film writers, and won the Golden Seal in Belgrade for his contribution to world cinema.

In June 2001 he was appointed a lecturer at FAMU, his alma mater, and was awarded a lifetime achievement award by the Masaryk Academy of Art in Prague. In 2002 he received a Czech Lion for artistic achievement and received the Pribina Cross from the Slovak government, a special award given to those who have aided in the economic, social or cultural development of Slovakia. His next feature was Post Coitum (2004), a comedy about love starring Franco Nero.

=== Bathory ===
2008 saw the release of Bathory, starring Anna Friel as 16th-17th century Hungarian countess and alleged mass murderer Elizabeth Báthory, who was reputed to have bathed in the blood of young Slovak women. Famke Janssen was originally cast in the title role.

In addition to being Jakubisko's first English-language film, Bathory was reported to be the most expensive motion picture production in the history of Czech or Slovak cinema, involving investment from numerous companies around Europe.

In 2007 it was reported that two former production staff members, Jan Milič and Karel Lupoměský, had stolen a copy of the film from studios in Prague and were threatening to release it on the Internet if they were not given £12,000. They were soon apprehended and the film was recovered, apparently without being released online. The pair were found guilty and received eight- and ten-month suspended sentences for attempted blackmail of producer Deana Horváthová.

The world premiere of Bathory was held at the Karlovy Vary Film Festival, Czech Republic on 10 July 2008. The film was named the most successful film of all time in Slovakia.

=== Later activities ===
In May 2012 he received a heart transplant in Prague.

In 2013 Jakubisko published the first part of his autobiography, Živé stříbro.

Jakubisko was working on a fairy tale, a sequel of The Feather Fairy. The film was scheduled for a theatrical release in winter 2022.

Jakubisko died in Prague on 24 February 2023, aged 84.

== Filmography ==
- Last attack ("Poslední nálet", 1960)
- Every day has a name ("Každý den má své jméno", 1960)
- Silver Wind ("Strieborný vietor", 1961)
- First Class ("První třída", 1962)
- Silence ("Mlčení", 1963)
- Rain ("Déšť", 1965)
- Waiting for Godot ("Čekají na Godota", 1965)
- Crucial Years ("Kristove roky", 1967); aka Christ's Years
- The Deserters and the Nomads ("Zbehovia a pútnici", 1968); aka Deserters and Pilgrims
- Birds, Orphans and Fools ("Vtáčkovia, siroty a blázni", 1969)
- The Construction of the Century ("Stavba storočia", 1972); documentary
- Slovakia – a country under the Tatras ("Slovensko - krajina pod Tatrami", 1975); TV documentary
- The Red Cross drummer ("Bubeník Červeného kríža", 1977); documentary
- Three bags of cement and a live rooster ("Tri vrecia cementu a živý kohút", 1978); documentary
- Painted on Wood ("Mal’ované na dreve", 1979); TV fantasy for children
- Build a House, Plant a Tree ("Postav dom, zasaď strom", 1980)
- Infidelity, Slovak Style ("Nevera po slovensky", 1981); two-part TV miniseries
- The Millennial Bee ("Tisícročná včela", 1983)
- The Feather Fairy ("Perinbaba", 1985)
- Freckled Max and the Spooks ("Pehatý Max a strašidlá", 1987)
- Frankenstein's Aunt ("Frankensteinova teta", 1987); TV miniseries
- Sitting on a Branch, Enjoying Myself ("Sedím na konári a je mi dobre", 1989)
- See You in Hell, Friends ("Dovidenia v pekle, priatelia", 1970, released 1990)
- Almost a Pink story ("Takmer ružový príbeh", 1990); for TV 2000 Wiesbaden, Germany
- It's Better to Be Wealthy and Healthy Than Poor and Ill (1992)
- An Ambiguous Report About the End of the World ("Nejasná zpráva o konci světa", 1997)
- Post Coitum (2004)
- Bathory (2008)
- Perinbaba: Two Realms (2023)

== Awards ==
Jakubisko has been awarded at more than eighty international film festivals.

=== Awards for specific films ===
| Year | Film | Festival/Awarding Body | Location | Award(s) |
|---|---|---|---|---|
| 1984 | The Millennial Bee | 22nd Festival of Czechoslovak Film | Banská Bystrica, Czechoslovakia | • Grand Prize |
| 1984 | The Millennial Bee | 4th Sevilla Film Festival | Sevilla, Spain | • Grand Prize |
| 1984 | The Millennial Bee | FEST Belgrade | Belgrade, Yugoslavia | • UNICEF Prize |
| 1984 | The Millennial Bee | 40th Venice Film Festival | Venice, Italy | • Golden Phoenix for Best Art Direction and Cinematography |
| 1984 | The Millennial Bee | | | • Czechoslovak Journalists’ Prize |
| 1985 | The Feather Fairy | 41st Venice Film Festival | Venice, Italy | • Catholic Prize |
| 1986 | The Feather Fairy | Gijón International Film Festival | Gijón, Spain | • Jury Prize for Best Special Effects |
| 1986 | The Feather Fairy | 42nd Venice Film Festival | Venice, Italy | • Certificate of Merit RAI II |
| 1986 | The Feather Fairy | Belgrade Film Festival | Belgrade, Yugoslavia | • Audience Prize for Best Film |
| 1986 | The Feather Fairy | 4th Film Festival for yought Lyon | Lyon, France | • Young Audience Member's Prize for Best Film |
| 1986 | The Feather Fairy | 24th Festival of Czechoslovak Film | Banská Bystrica, Czechoslovakia | • Prize for Art production |
| 1986 | The Feather Fairy | Zlín Film Festival | Zlín, Czechoslovakia | • Special Jury Prize |
| 1986 | The Feather Fairy | | Bratislava, Slovakia | • Slovak Film Medal |
| 1987 | The Feather Fairy | International Film Festival Rimouski | Rimouski, Quebec | • Grand Prize Camerio |
| 1987 | The Feather Fairy | 1st International Film Festival for Children | Buenos Aires, Argentina | • Grand Prize |
| 1989 | Sitting on a Branch, Enjoying Myself | Venice Film Festival | Venice, Italy | • Certificate of Merit RAI II |
| 1990 | Sitting on a Branch, Enjoying Myself | Strasbourg Film Festival | Strasbourg, France | • Le Prix du Jury • Alsace Media de Strasbourg Prize |
| 1990 | Sitting on a Branch, Enjoying Myself | Festival of Czechoslovak Film | Banská Bystrica, Czechoslovakia | • Special Jury Prize |
| 1990 | Sitting on a Branch, Enjoying Myself | Moscow International Film Festival | Moscow, Soviet Union | • Grand Prize |
| 1993 | It's Better to Be Wealthy and Healthy Than Poor and Ill | 9th Festroia International Film Festival | Setúbal, Portugal | • Grand prize (Golden Dolphin) |
| 1997 | An ambiguous report about the end of the world | Flaiano Prizes | Pescara, Italy | • Best Director • Golden Dolphin |
| 1998 | An ambiguous report about the end of the world | Slovak Literary Fund | | • Special prize for Direction |
| 1998 | An ambiguous report about the end of the world | San Diego Film Festival | San Diego, United States | • Prize for Best Direction |
| 1998 | An ambiguous report about the end of the world | Montreal World Film Festival | Montreal, Canada | • Prize for the Greatest Artistic Contribution and Cinematography of the Year |
| 1998 | An ambiguous report about the end of the world | Taos Talking Pictures Film Festival | Taos, United States | • Prize for visual contribution in cinematography |
| 1999 | Sitting on a Branch, Enjoying Myself | Cran Gavier '99 | France | • Best film |
| 2001 | Wild Flowers | Czech Lion Awards 2000 | Czech Republic | • Best film poster |
| 2009 | Bathory | Art Film Fest | Trenčianske Teplice, Slovakia | • Igric Award (Award for the Artistic Design of the Film) |
| 2009 | Bathory | Czech Lion Awards 2008 | Czech Republic | • Best artistic asset of the year • Best artist and artistic concept |
| 2010 | Bathory | Sun in a Net Awards | Slovakia | • Best artistic design |
| 2010 | Bathory | Monaco Charity Film Fest | Monaco | • Best Artistic achievement |

=== Other recognition ===
| Year | Awarding Body | Location | Award |
|---|---|---|---|
| 1991 | AFI Fest | Los Angeles, United States | • Tribute award |
| 1998 | Taos Talking Pictures Film Festival | Taos, United States | • Maverick Award For Vision in Film |
| 1998 | 21st Denver Film Festival | Denver, United States | • Outstanding achievement In the Art of Film |
| 1998 | Czech Literary Fund | Czech Republic | • Best director of the year |
| 2000 | Yugoslavian Cinematheque | Belgrade, Serbia | • Golden Seal for Major Contribution To The Advancement Of Art In Film |
| 2001 | Masaryk Academy Of The Arts | Prague, Czech Republic | • Lifetime Achievement Award |
| 2002 | 10th Art Film Fest | Trenčianske Teplice, Slovakia | • Golden Camera award for outstanding achievements in cinematography and lifetime artistic contributions to Slovak Cinema |
| 2003 | Government of Slovakia | | • Pribina Cross, Second Class |
| 2003 | Czech Lion Awards 2002 | Czech Republic | • Personal award for outstanding achievements in cinematography and lifetime artistic contributions to Czech Cinema |
| 2008 | 43rd Karlovy Vary International Film Festival | Karlovy Vary, Czech Republic | • Special Crystal Globe for outstanding achievements in cinematography and lifetime artistic contributions to World Cinema |
| 2009 | Associazione Culturale Premio Elsa Morante | Portugal | • Premia Elsa Morante, Cinematography award |
| 2012 | Gijón International Film Festival | Gijón, Spain | • Personal award for outstanding achievements in cinematography and lifetime artistic contributions to world Cinema |

== Theatre ==
- Casanova (1995) ballet, Laterna Magica, Prague, Czech Republic
- Krútňava (1999) opera, Slovak National Theatre, Bratislava, Slovakia
- Svätopluk (2008) opera, Slovak National Theatre, Bratislava, Slovakia

== Exhibitions ==
- Paris (2000), France
- Berlin (2004), Germany, Italy (2004)
- Prague (2004, 2005), Czech Republic
- Miro Gallery, Bratislava (2009), Slovakia
  - Presidential palace, Bratislava (2009), Slovakia
- 6 exhibitions (2010), Czech Republic
