= Prašice =

Prašice Nyitraperjés
- Municipality
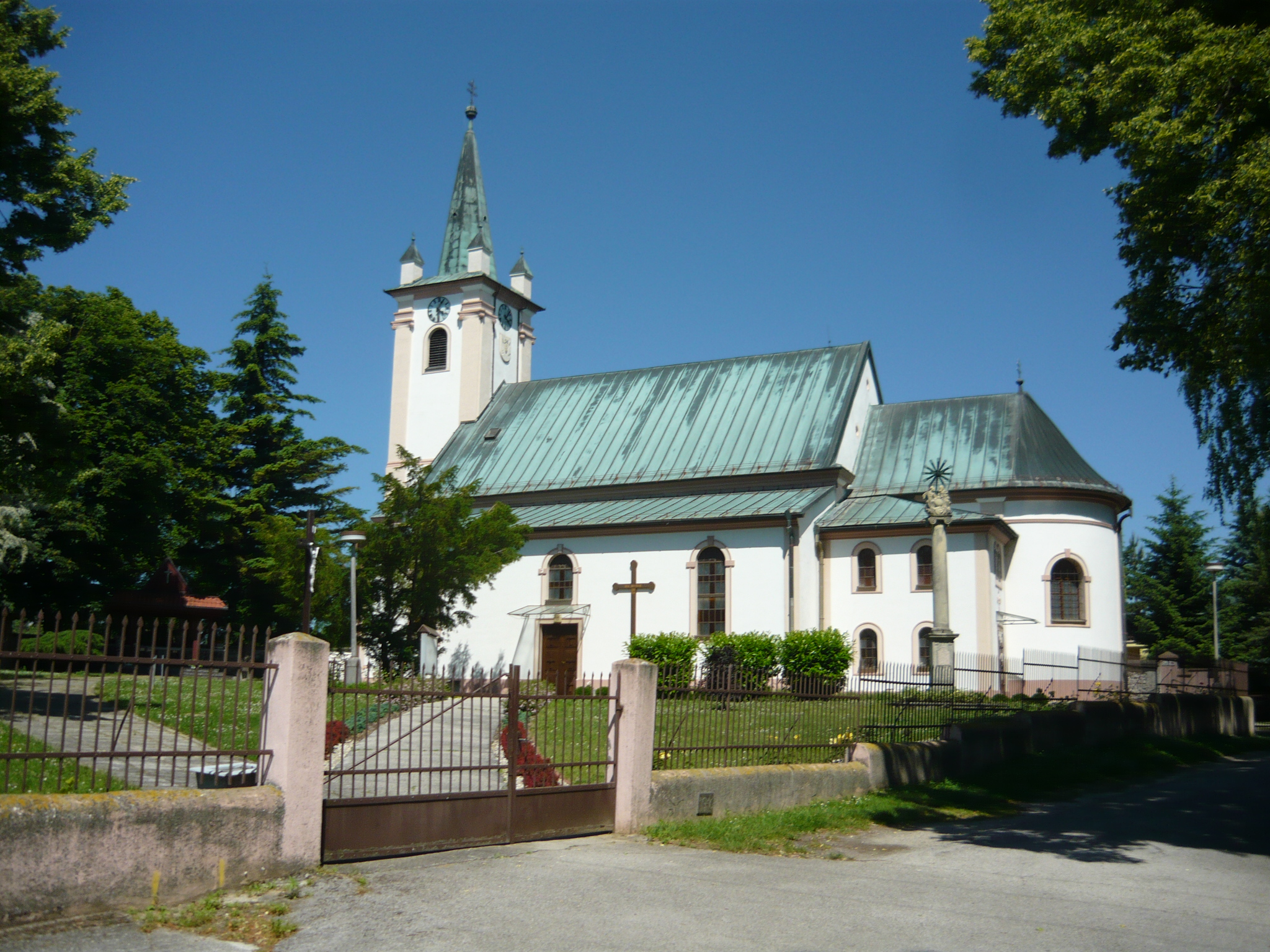

- Flag

- Location of Prašice in the Nitra Region Location of Prašice in Slovakia
- Coordinates: 48.63°N 18.10°E
- Country: Slovakia
- Region: Nitra Region
- District: Topoľčany District
- First mentioned: 1245

Area
  - Total: 28.24 km^{2} (10.90 sq mi)
- Elevation: 256 m (840 ft)

Population (2025)
  - Total: 1,945
- Time zone: UTC+1 (CET)
  - Summer (DST): UTC+2 (CEST)
- Postal code: 956 22
- Area code: +421 38
- Vehicle registration plate (until 2022): TO
- Website: www.prasice.sk

Prašice (Hungarian: Nyitraperjés) is a municipality in the Topoľčany District, Nitra Region, Slovakia. In 2011 it had 2029 inhabitants.

== Geography ==
The municipality lies at an altitude of 256 metres (840 ft) and covers an area of 28.24 km^{2} (10.90 sq mi) (2025).

== Population ==
Population statistic (10 years)
Year	1995	2005	2015	2025
Count	2093	2117	2035	1945
Difference		+1.14%	−3.87%	−4.42%

Population statistic
Year	2024	2025
Count	1973	1945
Difference		−1.41%

It has a population of 1945 people (31 December 2025).

=== Ethnicity ===
Census 2021 (1+ %)
Ethnicity	Number	Fraction
Slovak	1975	97.05%
Not found out	56	2.75%
Total	2035	

In year 2021 was 2035 people by ethnicity 1975 as Slovak, 56 as Not found out, 9 as Other, 7 as Ukrainian, 5 as Czech, 3 as Russian, 3 as German, 2 as Rusyn, 2 as Hungarian, 1 as Turkish, 1 as Romanian, 1 as Polish, 1 as Canadian and 1 as Bulgarian.

Note on population: The difference values of population numbers in the table "Population statistic" and in the sections "Ethnicity" & "Religion" is caused by the use of various statistical methods.

=== Religion ===
Census 2021 (1+ %)
Religion	Number	Fraction
Roman Catholic Church	1654	81.28%
None	241	11.84%
Not found out	52	2.56%
Evangelical Church	28	1.38%
Total	2035	

In year 2021 was 2035 people by religion 1654 from Roman Catholic Church, 241 from None, 52 from Not found out, 28 from Evangelical Church, 17 from Jehovah's Witnesses, 8 from Other, 8 from Ad hoc movements, 7 from Greek Catholic Church, 5 from Paganism and natural spirituality, 3 from Eastern Orthodox Church, 3 from Buddhism, 3 from Apostolic Church, 2 from Christian Congregations in Slovakia, 1 from Calvinist Church, 1 from Islam, 1 from United Methodist Church and 1 from Czechoslovak Hussite Church.

== Notable people ==
- Ľubomír Paulovič (1952–2024) - actor; mayor of Prašice (2006–2010)
