= Sitting on a Branch, Enjoying Myself =

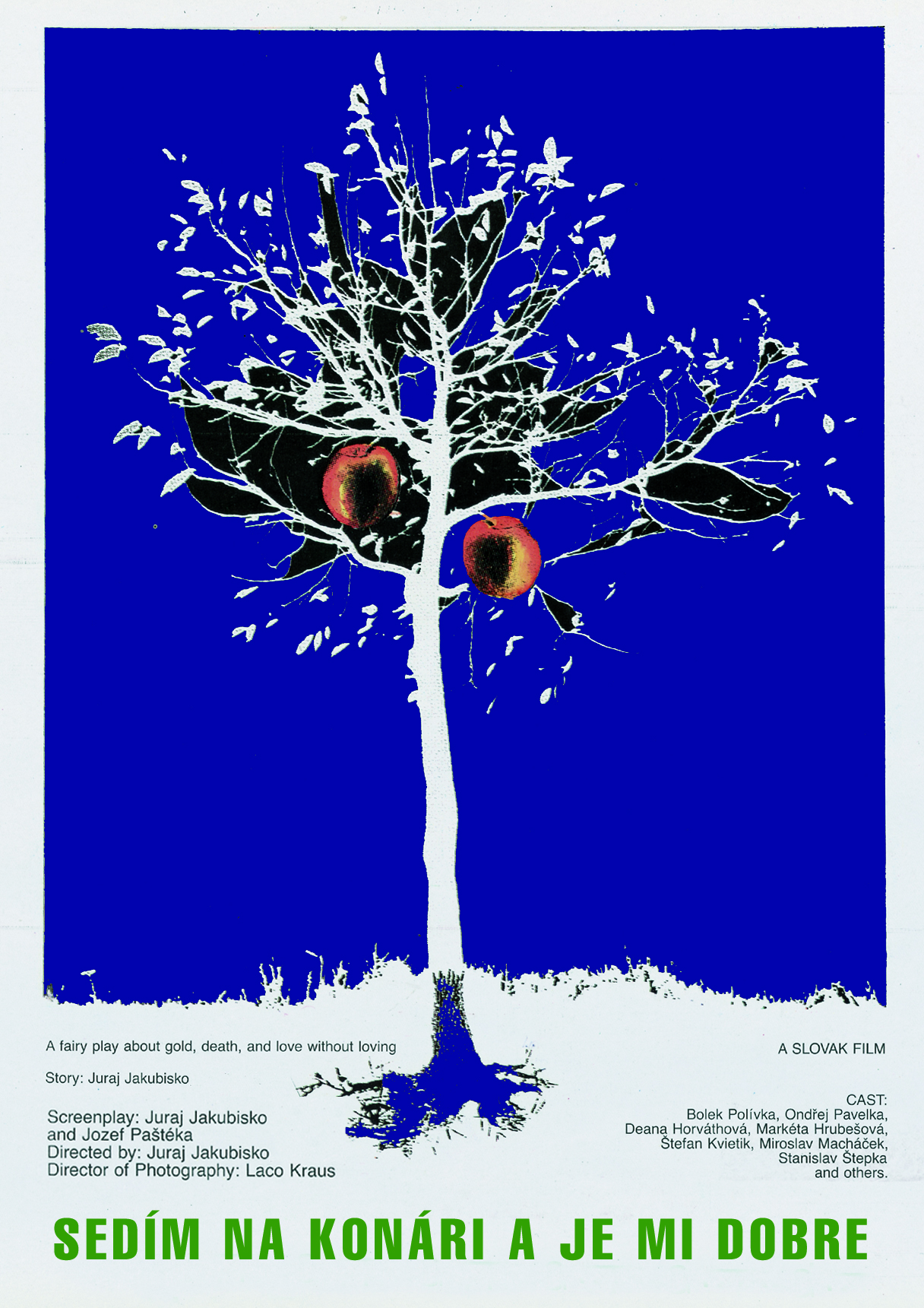
- Directed by: Juraj Jakubisko
- Cinematography: Ladislav Kraus
- Music by: Jiří Bulis
- Release date: 1989
- Countries: Czechoslovakia; West Germany
- Languages: Czech; Slovak

Sitting on a Branch, Enjoying Myself (Slovak: Sedím na konári a je mi dobre) is a 1989 Czechoslovak-West German comedy-drama film directed by Juraj Jakubisko. It was entered into the main competition at the 46th Venice International Film Festival.

== Synopsis ==
The story follows a part-dream sequence tragi-comedy of the end of World War II and the communist regime, with comedian Pepe and frontline soldier Prengel. The two become best friends after discovering gold together, and meet Ester, a melancholic Jewish girl who returned from a concentration camp, with a romance subplot involving her. It also includes three people without homes seeking happiness in their time period. The state of the 1950s is represented by a young communist, Želmíra, who turns their world upside-down.

== Cast ==
- Bolek Polívka - Pepe
- Ondřej Pavelka - Prengel
- Deana Horváthová - Želmíra
- Štefan Kvietik - kapitán Kornet
- Markéta Hrubešová - Ester
- Miroslav Macháček - Krištofík

== Film Awards ==
- Cran Gavier´99 1999
  • Prize for the best film
- Moscow International Film Festival 1990
  • Grand Prize
- Festival of Czechoslovak film 1990
  • Special Jury Prize
- IFF Stasbourg 1990
  •Le Prix du Jury and the Alsace Media de Strasbourg Prize
- Venice Film Festival 1989
  • Certificate of Merit RAI II
