= Karol Sidon =

Czech rabbi, writer, and playwright

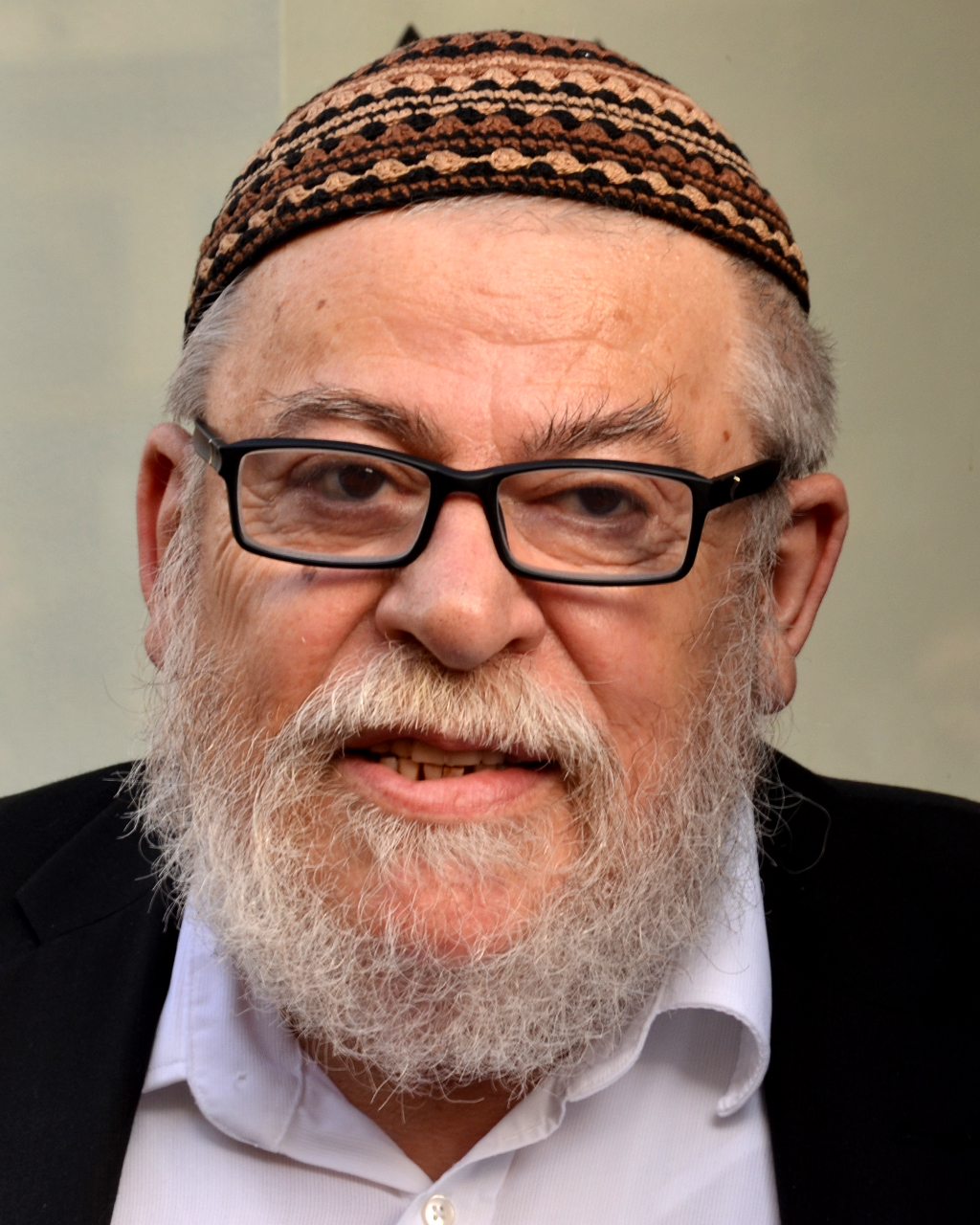
Karol Sidon in 2016

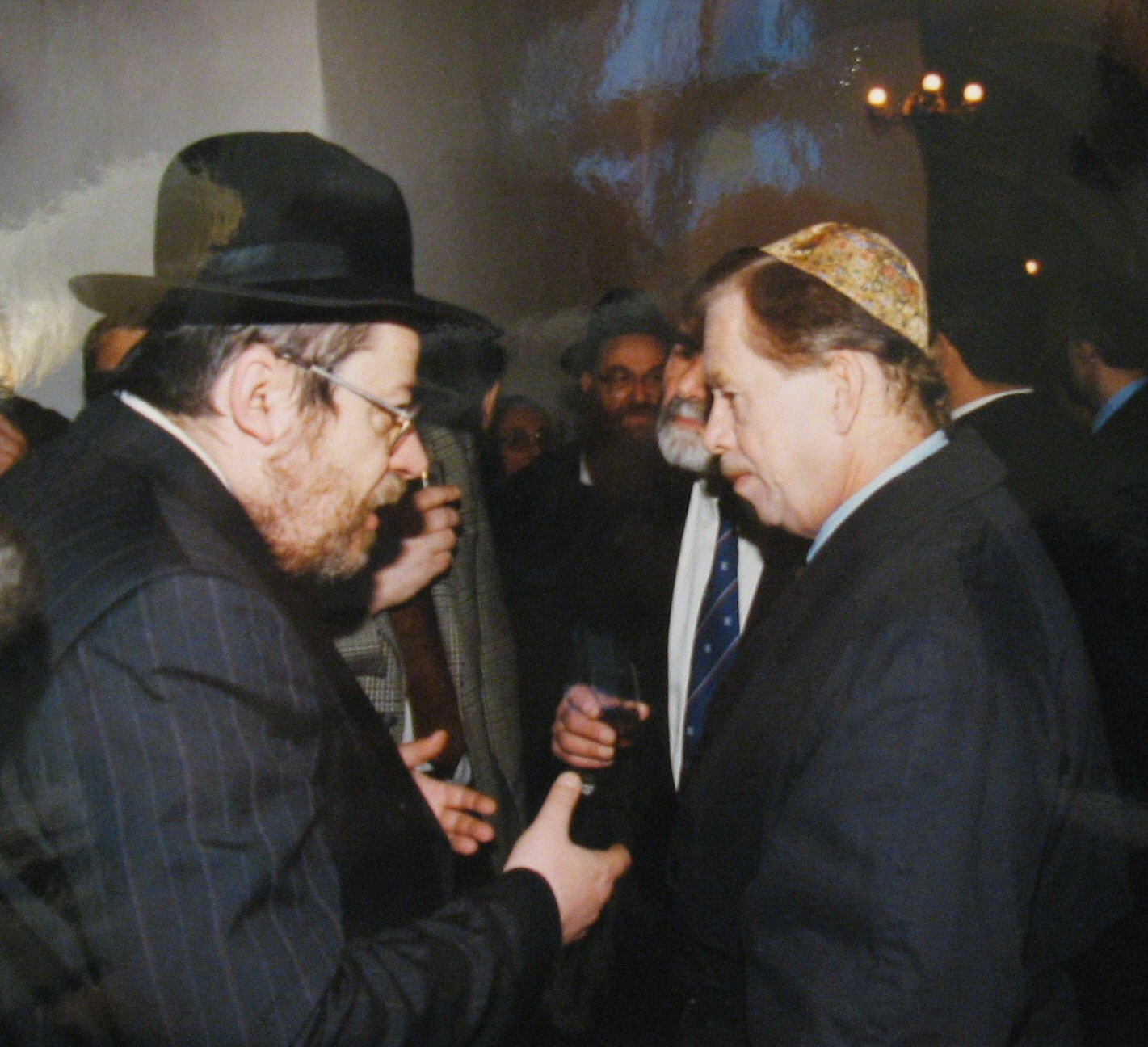
Karol Sidon speaking with Czechoslovak president Václav Havel

Karol Efraim Sidon (born 9 August 1942) is a Czech rabbi, writer and playwright. He is the Chief Rabbi of the Czech Republic, and former Chief Rabbi of the city of Prague.

== Life ==
Born in Prague during the war, Karol Sidon is a distant relative of rabbi Yosef Chaim Sonnenfeld. His father Alexander Sidon came from Trnava, where his great-uncle Shimon Sidon was the first rabbi after a long expulsion of Jews from the city. Alexander was arrested in 1944 and imprisoned by the Gestapo in Pankrác and in Terezin, where he was tortured to death in the same year. Karol was then hidden away in the countryside until the end of the occupation. His mother raised him alone until 1948 when she remarried a Jew.

He began studying at the Academy of Musical Art in Prague in 1960 where he began writing film scripts, and radio plays for Czech public radio - Český rozhlas. Until 1968 he worked as a producer for Czech puppeteer Jiří Trnka. In the same year, Sidon's first book, which became a cult book "Sen o mém otci" ("Dream about my father") was published, in which the author deals with his being brought up without his Jewish father Alexander Sidon, who perished in the Terezín ghetto (his wife was a Christian). In 1977 he was a signatory to Charter 77. He received the Jiří Kolář prize in 1978. He was married to Marcela Třebická, he is the father of the actors Daniel Sidon and Magdalena Sidonová.

In 1983 he emigrated to West Germany and he studied Jewish studies at the Heidelberg university. He became ordained as a Rabbi after studying for a time in Israel. He returned to the Czech Republic in 1992, where he became chief rabbi of Prague.

To help restore the Jewish Orthodox community Rabbi Sidon invited many young rabbinical families from Israel. He founded the Lauder School (elementary school named Gur Aryeh and a grammar school named Or Chadash), the construction of a mikveh, the establishment of a bet midrash Tiferet Uzi (named after his teacher Uzi Kalchheim), Beit Din or kosher shop and Certificates.

=== Community tensions in Prague ===
In 2004 and 2005, Sidon and his supporters had a conflict with Prague's Jewish Community Council. This led to Sidon's brief ouster as Chief Rabbi of the city and of his position as rabbi of the city's landmark Altneuschul. It did not affect his status as Rabbi of the Czech Republic, as he retained support of the Federation of Jewish Communities.

In April 2004 a coalition headed by Tomáš Jelínek succeeded in installing new leadership of the Prague community. Their goal was to change the way the community worked, being more open to less traditional Jews. In June, in a controversial move, they ousted Sidon from his position as head of the community and its main synagogue, the Altneuschul. Jelinek explained that Sidon failed to fulfill his duties properly, but Sidon and the Roth group countered that the move was politically motivated, and an attempt to change the Orthodox nature of the community's practices.

The council appointed the local Chabad rabbi, an American named Manis Barash, to lead the synagogue, with other communal rabbinic duties split between Barash and two other local rabbis. Sidon took Jelinek to an Israeli rabbinical court. It ruled that Barash should continue to head the synagogue, but Sidon claimed that Jelinek gave false testimony, negating the ruling. Others in the community ran a grassroots campaign called Community for All, to remove the new leadership, over several dismissals and violation of privacy. A general assembly vote succeeded in November, replacing Jelinek and his group with another group, led by Jakub Roth. Jelinek refused to leave the office; he and others barricaded themselves in the offices, with hired bodyguards. The ouster was confirmed by another vote on 20 December. The second vote's validity was contested by Jelinek's group, but the national Federation of Jewish Communities recognized and accepted it in January 2005.

Barash continued to lead the synagogue. Deputy chairman of the community Jakub Roth told the press: "this is part of the local Chabad's striving to take over the community's religious life. We have seen an ugly foray of Chabad in their attempt to take over the Old-New synagogue." On 15 April 2005 the two factions brawled, when Sidon was offered an honor at the synagogue's Sabbath services, by the gabbai Jacob Svab. The synagogue in the ancient Jewish Quarter became the scene of an emotional dispute between members of the Chabad movement and followers of Sidon, who had moved his services to the High Synagogue. Tensions were finally resolved toward the end of the year, with all sides agreeing to new elections. The Community for All platform won three-quarters of the vote on December 8, while Jelinek's Coalition for a Democratic Community secured three seats on the board. The last three seats went to community members who did not join either group Sidon was promptly restored to his position the next day.

== Published works ==
- Sen o mém otci, 1968, (Dream about My Father)
- Sen o mně, 1970, (Dream about Myself)
- Boží osten, 1975, (The Sting of God)
- Brány mrazu, 1977, (Gates of Frost)
- Dvě povídky o utopencích, 1988, (Two Stories about the Drowned People)
- Evangelium podle Josefa Flavia, 1974, (The Gospel According to Josephus Flavius)

=== Plays ===
- Dvojí Zákon, 1968, (The Law)
- Labyrint (cirkus podle Komenského), 1972, (Labyrinth, Circus According to Comenius)
- Shapira, 1972, (Shapira)
- Zpívej mi na cestu, (Sing Me for the Trip)
- Maringotka Zuzany Kočové, (Caravan of Zuzana Kočová)

=== Children's books ===
- Pohádky ze čtyř šuplíčků, 1979, (Fairy Tales from Four Drawers) (appeared under the name of his wife Marcela Třebická).

=== Doctrinal works ===
His doctrinal works can be found in the magazine Rosh Chodesh and the Jewish Yearbook. From this perspective, it is unquestionably the most important Czech translation of the Five Books of Moses, which was published Sefer. Important is also further translation activity. Translated New Prague Passover Haggadah, sidur (yet unpublished translation of the prayer book) or Machzor on high holidays.

=== Chaim Cigan ===
Pseudonym Chaim Cigan is the name of one of his ancestors. "Altschulova Metoda," Altschul's Method is the first of four books (Piano live, Puzzle, Outsider) in a science fiction series "mixing politics, prison cells and the secret police with the Middle Ages, Moses and Jewish history – a science fiction thriller told across continents and epochs,"

- Altschul's Method (2014)
- Piano live (2015)

=== Filmography ===
- Bohemia Docta aneb Labyrint světa a lusthauz srdce (2000) (Bohemia Docta or Labyrinth of the World and Lusthauz of the Heart)
- Adam a Gabriel (1973) (Adam and Gabriel)
- Otcové a děti (1971) (Fathers and Sons). Adaptation of a novel by Turgenev
- See You in Hell, Friends (1970/1990)
- Ptáčkové, sirotci a blázni (1969) (Birds, Orphans and Fools)
- Zběhové a poutníci (1968) (Deserters and Pilgrims)
