= It's Better to Be Wealthy and Healthy Than Poor and Ill =

It’s better to be wealthy and healthy than poor and ill
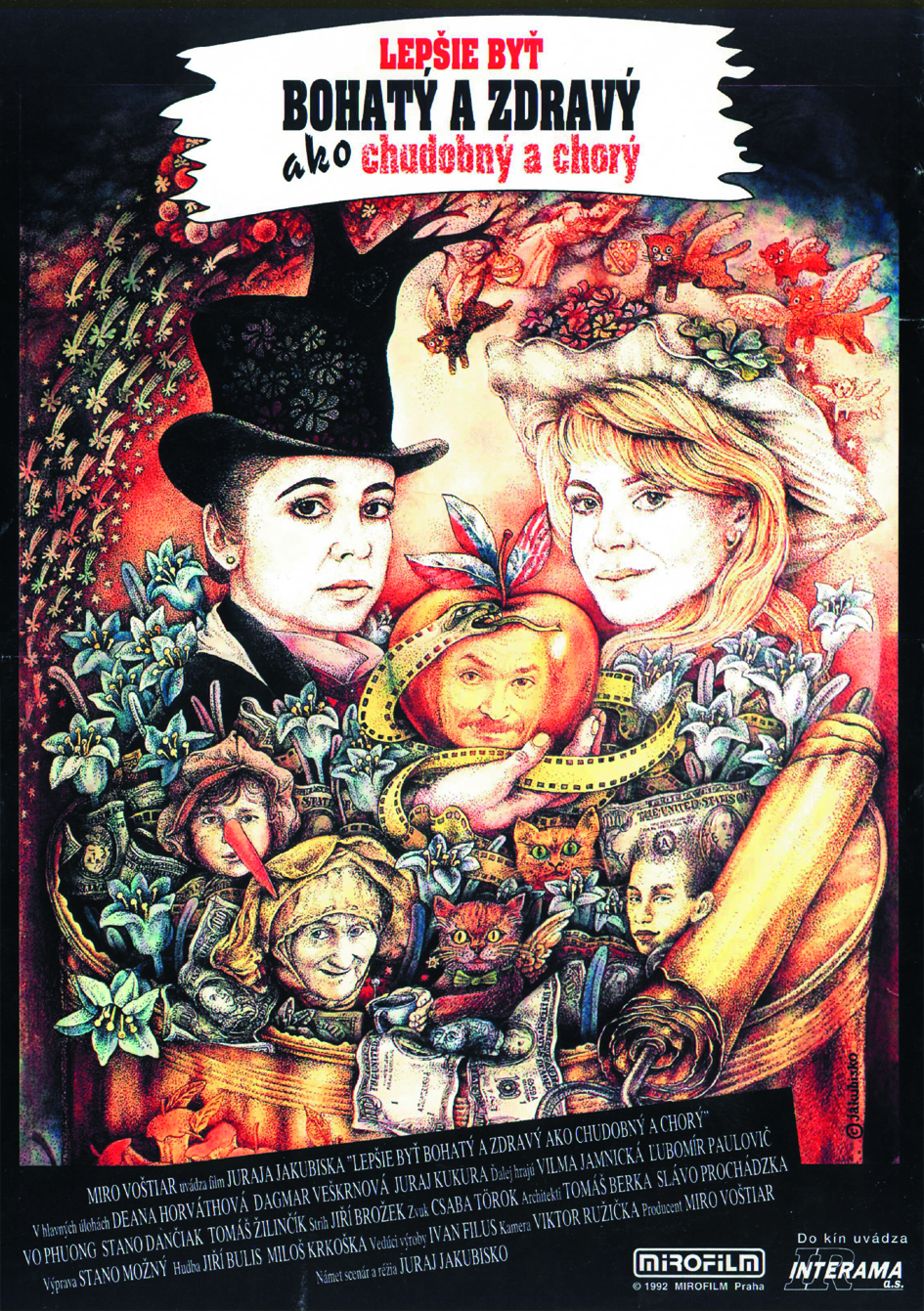
- Lepší je být bohatý a zdravý než chudý a nemocný
- Directed by: Juraj Jakubisko
- Written by: Juraj Jakubisko
- Produced by: Deana Horváthová
- Starring: Deana Horváthová; Dagmar Veškrnová; Juraj Kukura; Vilma Jamnická; Ľubomír Paulovič; V. D. Hoai Phuong; Karin Haydu
- Cinematography: Viktor Růžička
- Music by: Jiří Bulis; Miloš Krkoška
- Production companies: Jakubisko film, Czech Television
- Distributed by: Mirofilm
- Release date: 11 November 1992
- Running time: 108 minutes
- Country: Czechoslovakia
- Languages: Czech; Slovak

It's Better to Be Wealthy and Healthy Than Poor and Ill (Lepší je být bohatý a zdravý než chudý a nemocný) is a 1992 Czech film directed by Juraj Jakubisko.

== Synopsis ==
A satiric tragi-comedy about two women and their lover, Robert, who is an emigrant that keeps coming back. This film shows the chaotic post-communist Europe.

Two opposite characters, women, meet during the Velvet Revolution in November 1989. Intellectual dissident, Nona, and a Communist secret police boss' mistress, Ester. They meet at an anti-regime demonstration and become friends. They don't want anything to do with politics, both want to get married and have kids, but also get rich. Crazy plans and risky attempts to realize their shared dreams land them in many sticky situations in the post-revolution chaos. Too much money gets in the way of the power of friendship.

== Awards ==
1993: Golden Dolphin at the Tróia International Film Festival
