= Birds, Orphans and Fools =

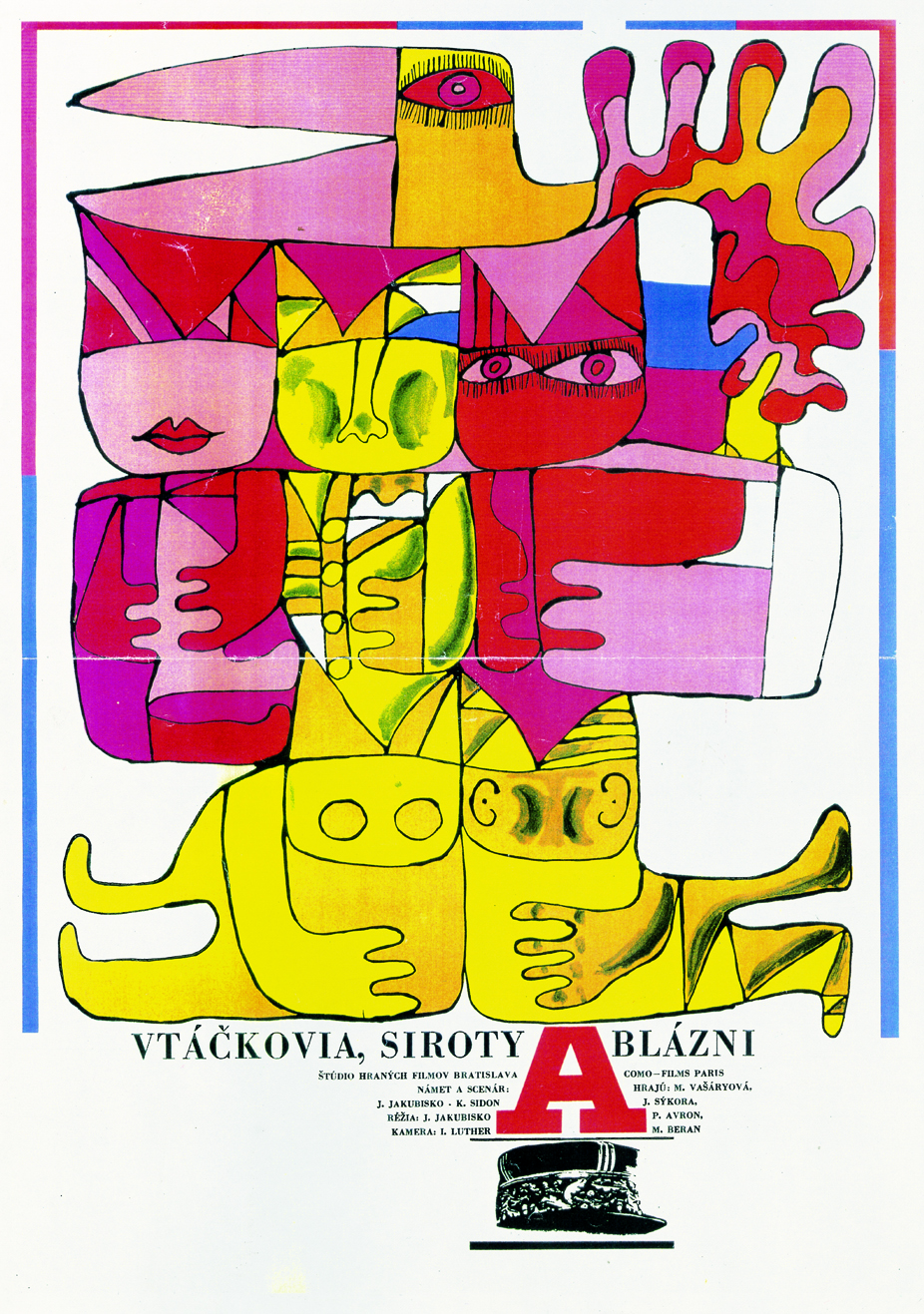
- Directed by: Juraj Jakubisko
- Written by: Juraj Jakubisko; Karol Sidon
- Produced by: Jan Svikruha; Jan Tomaskovic
- Starring: Philippe Avron; Jiří Sýkora; Magda Vášáryová
- Cinematography: Igor Luther
- Edited by: Maximilián Remeň; Bob Wade
- Music by: Zdeněk Liška
- Release date: September 27, 1969 (Czechoslovakia)
- Running time: 81 minutes
- Country: Czechoslovakia
- Language: Slovak

Birds, Orphans and Fools (Slovak: Vtáčkovia, siroty a blázni) is a 1969 Czechoslovak fantasy film directed by Juraj Jakubisko. The film is about three people who are all orphaned by political violence. In an unspecified time and place, these three characters face a tough, violent world and survive by adopting a childlike philosophy of life and live a life of foolish, joyful denial.

The film released in 1969 and was shown that year at an international film festival in Sorrento, Italy. Soon after, though, it was banned by the communist authorities until the end of the regime in 1989.

== Plot ==
The main characters, Yorick, Martha and Ondrej, exist in a bleak, cynical world. All of them have been orphaned during a war. To survive, they adopt a childlike philosophy where they live in love and joy, and seem to be immune to despair. "Life is beautiful," screams the main characters.

The trio live with birds in a bombed church in the center of a city. At first it seems that they are all enjoying their play.

The key struggle is the relationship of the two men to Martha. Yorick develops a relationship with Martha quickly. Ondrej, a virgin, has a harder time getting close to Martha, not withstanding prodding by Yorick. In an odd move, Yorick has himself arrested and is sent to jail for a year during which time Martha and Ondrej's relationship develops.

Each of the characters in the film goes through a long internal development. The most apparent is that of Yorick, who after returning from prison, "lost the courage to be crazy". Ondrej seems to find passion in his love for Martha.

Jealousy of Ondrej and Martha's relationship incites Yorick to murder Martha and her unborn baby and then commit suicide. Ondrej's fate remains unknown.

== Political subtext ==
The film was made soon after the Warsaw Pact invasion of Czechoslovakia. In the movie the main characters are living in an enchanted world of love, joy and freedom, but in fact, they are not free. The world is dismal and lacking the freedom that they pretend to enjoy. As Jakubisko is quoted as saying: "Foolish games and death are cruel. Maybe too cruel. When I shot my fiction in 1968 there were people lying on the sidewalks. They didn’t have to fake death."

== Production ==
Birds, Orphans and Fools was made in 1969 and had a limited release before it was banned. It would be 20 years before the Soviet ban of the film was lifted with the end of the Soviet Regime. The film was censured for its negative, hopeless and non-socialist content. When it finally debuted at the 1990 film festival it was met with resounding approval and success. Birds, Orphans and Fools came out in 2009 in a DVD edition.

The production staff includes architect Anton Krajčovič and costume designers Milena Doskočová, Helena Pale.

Both the exterior and interior scenes were filmed in Slovakia. The movie was filmed in Bratislava, Piestany and Bradlo. The movie was produced by Slovenská filmová tvorba, Bratislava, Czechoslovakia and Como Film Paris, France.

== Cast ==
- Magda Vášáryová as Martha
- Jiří Sýkora as Yorick
- Philippe Avron as Ondrej
- Mila Beran as the domestic man
- Francoise Goldité as Saša

== Awards ==
- 1969 — Jakubisko received the Gold Siren Award at the Sorrento Film Festival in Italy for his first three films: Crucial Years (Kristove roky), Birds, Orphans and Fools and Deserters and Pilgrims (Zbehovia a pútnici)
- 1973 — Second Prize for film director Juraj Jakubisko at the Avoriaz Fantastic Film Festival (France)
- 2008 — Crystal Globe awarded to Director Jakubisko at the Karlovy Vary International Film Festival
