= See You in Hell, Friends =

1990 film

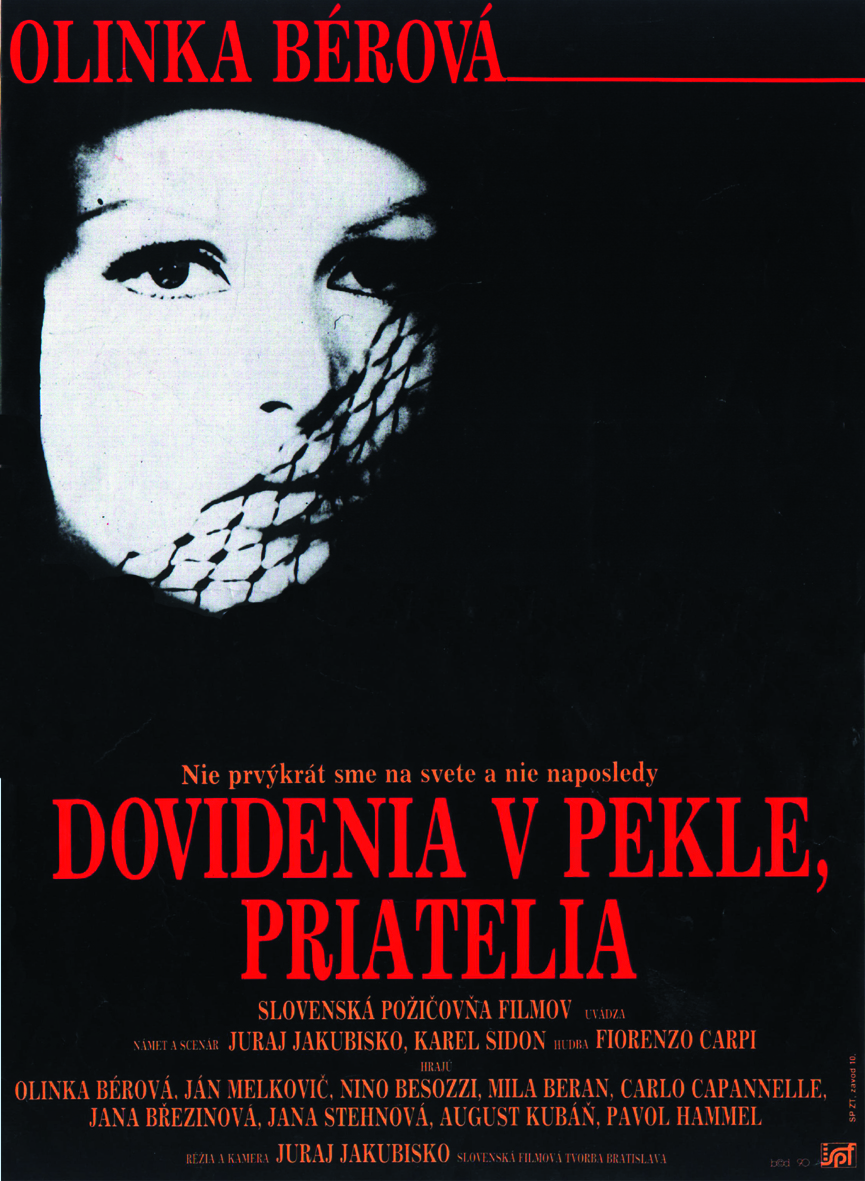
- Directed by: Juraj Jakubisko
- Written by: Juraj Jakubisko; Karol Sidon
- Starring: Olinka Bérová; Ján Melkovič
- Cinematography: Juraj Jakubisko
- Edited by: Patrik Pašš
- Music by: Fiorenzo Carpi
- Release date: 1990
- Countries: Czechoslovakia; Italy
- Language: Slovak

See You in Hell, Friends (Czech: Dovidenia v pekle, priatelia, Italian: Arrivederci all'inferno, amici) is a 1990 surreal comedy-drama film co-written and directed by Juraj Jakubisko. It premiered out of competition at the 47th Venice International Film Festival.

== Cast ==
- Olinka Bérová as Rita
- Ján Melkovič as Petras
- Nino Besozzi as the Colonel
- Míla Beran as the Colonel's Father
- Carlo Capannelle as Father Matthias

== Production ==
The film was conceived during the Prague Spring, with production starting in 1969 only to be interrupted by Communist censorship before shooting had finished. Following the revolutions of 1989, Jakubisko was able to resume the production and to finish the film.

== Release ==
The film premiered out of competition at the 47th edition of the Venice Film Festival.

== Reception ==
A contemporary Variety review described the film as "a strange, alienating picture" whose "material seems to have dated badly, because, like much of the late '60s cinema, the frenetic style hasn't stood the test of time". La Stampa's film critic Alessandra Levantesi referred to it as "an allegorical and extravagant fable" characterized by "a grotesque vein, a feeling of the inexorable alternation of life and death, a conception of art as a privileged expression of the spirit, some magic, a pagan religiosity, a very Slovakian surreal inventiveness, some didactic comments, some insistent symbolism". Paolo Mereghetti described the film as "almost a children's version of Sweet Movie filled with cloying Fellini-esque moments".
