= Giulietta Masina =

Italian actress (1921–1994)

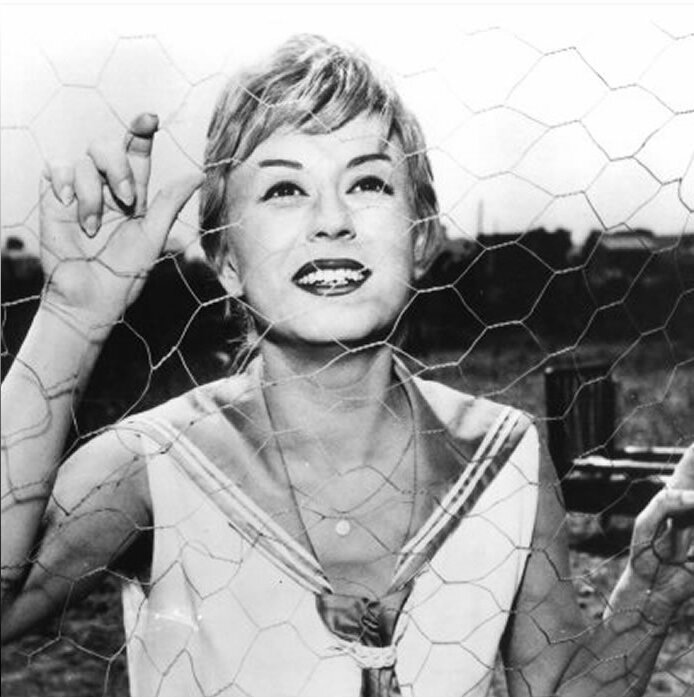
- Masina as Cabiria in Nights of Cabiria (1957)
- Born: Giulia Anna Masina; 22 February 1921; San Giorgio di Piano, Bologna, Kingdom of Italy
- Died: 23 March 1994 (aged 73); Rome, Italy
- Burial place: Monumental Cemetery of Rimini
- Occupation: Actress
- Years active: 1942–1991
- Spouse: Federico Fellini (m. 1943; died 1993)

Signature
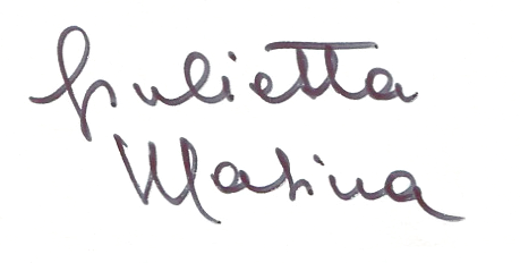

Giulia Anna "Giulietta" Masina (Italian: [dʒuˈljetta maˈziːna]; 22 February 1921 – 23 March 1994) was an Italian film actress best known for her performances as Gelsomina in La Strada (1954) and Cabiria in Nights of Cabiria (1957), for which she won the Cannes Film Festival Award for Best Actress at the 1957 Cannes Film Festival.

Cinema historian Peter Bondanella described Masina's work as "masterful" and "unforgettable"; and Charlie Chaplin, with whose work Masina's is often compared, called her "the actress who moved him most".

Both La Strada and Nights of Cabiria won Academy Awards for Best Foreign Language Film and were described as having been "inspired" by Masina's "humanity".

== Life ==
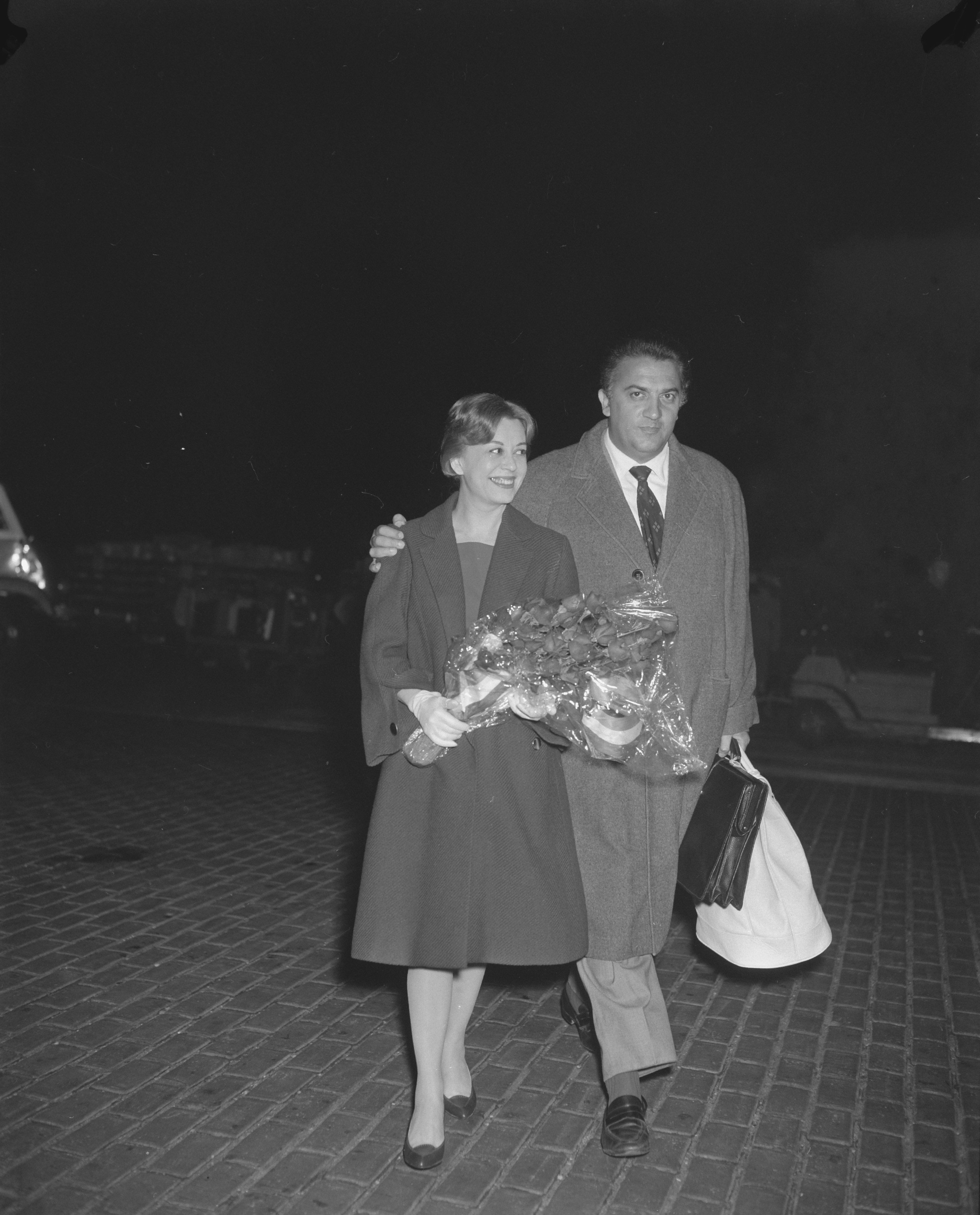
Masina and Fellini in Schiphol, 1958

Giulia Anna Masina was born in San Giorgio di Piano, north of Bologna, the eldest of four children. Her father was a violinist and her mother was a schoolteacher. When Masina was four, her uncle took her to meet the Italian playwright Luigi Pirandello, who was later to win the Nobel Prize in literature. A few years later, when this uncle died, his widow, Masina's aunt, asked Masina's parents if they would allow her to come to Rome to stay with her. Masina's parents agreed, in part because they believed that Masina would have more success in Rome in the arts for which she was already demonstrating a unique talent.

Masina attended an Ursuline convent school and took lessons in voice, piano, and dance. Her first experiences acting took place during World War II as part of the theater section of Rome's Gruppi Universitari Fascisti, a state-sponsored but university-student-led arts organization. She graduated with a degree in Literature from Sapienza University of Rome. She found work as a voice actress in radio during the war, which earned her more money and attention than stage acting. It was as a radio artist that Masina met Federico Fellini, a radio scriptwriter. They married in 1943, and a few months later, Masina suffered a miscarriage after falling down a flight of stairs. In 1944, she became pregnant again; Pierfederico (nicknamed Federichino) was born on 22 March 1945 but died from encephalitis 11 days later. Masina and Fellini had no other children. Masina was a devout Catholic.

== Career ==
Masina in La Strada (1954)

Working together with her husband, Masina made the transition to on-screen acting. Half of her Italian films, the more successful projects, were either written or directed by her husband. Masina made her film debut in an uncredited role in Roberto Rossellini's Paisà (1946), which was co-written by Fellini. She received her first screen credit in Alberto Lattuada's Without Pity (Senza pietà, 1948), which was an adaptation co-written by Fellini, and played opposite John Kitzmiller.

She starred with Anthony Quinn in Fellini's La Strada (1954), playing the abused stooge of Quinn's travelling circus strongman. She won the Best Actress Award at the Cannes Film Festival for her portrayal of the title role in Fellini's Nights of Cabiria (1957). She played a prostitute who endures life's tragedies and disappointments with both innocence and resilience. Both films received the Academy Award for Best Foreign-Language Film. In a 1998 New York Times review, Janet Maslin wrote that there is more "grace and courage" in Masina's performance than "all the fire-breathing blockbusters Hollywood has to offer."

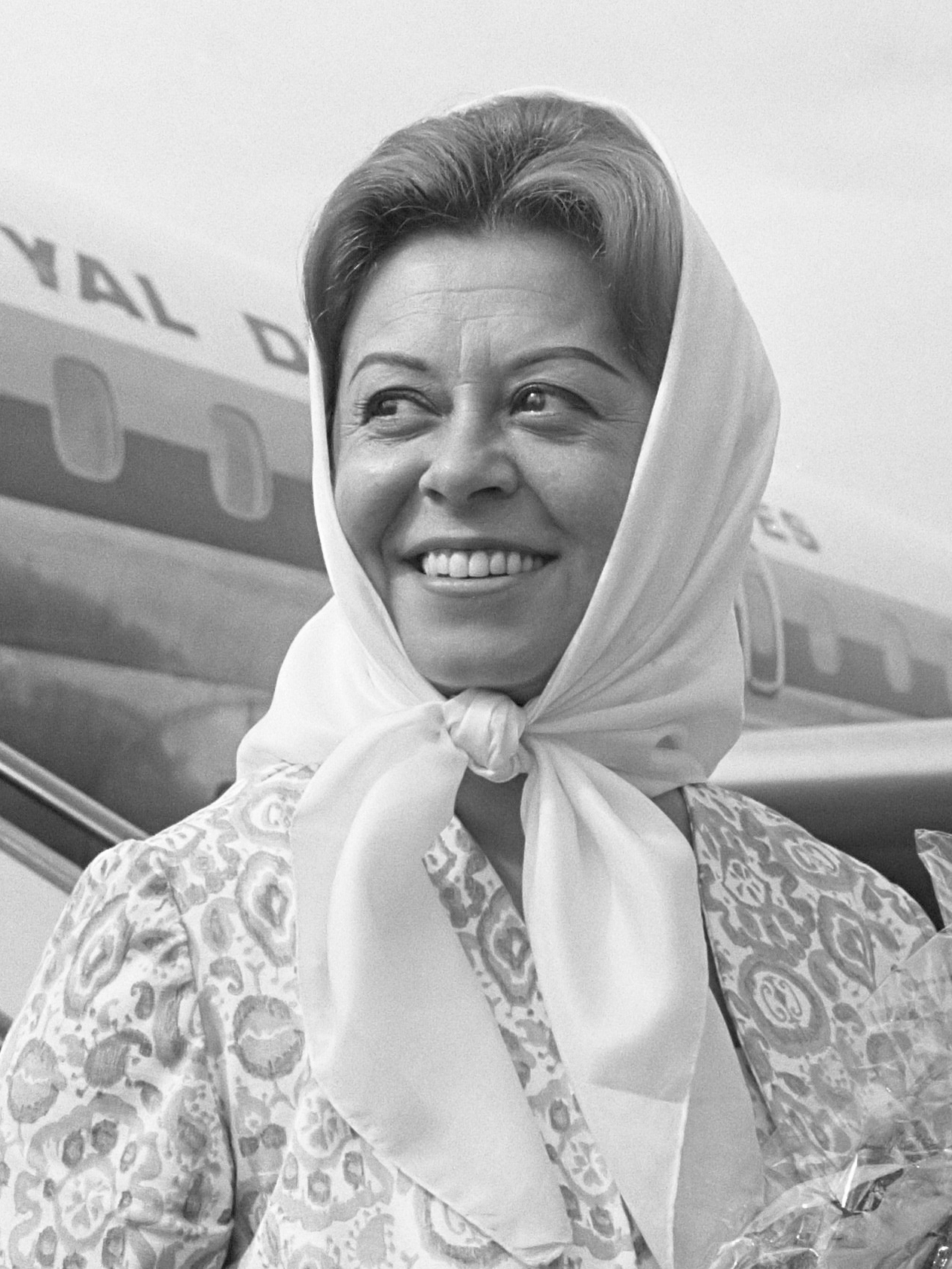
Masina in 1966

Masina's career was damaged by the critical and box office failure of The High Life (1960) directed by Julien Duvivier. Subsequently, she became dedicated almost entirely to her personal life and marriage. Nonetheless, she again worked with Fellini in Juliet of the Spirits (1965), which earned both the New York Film Critics award (1965) and the Golden Globe award (1966) for Best Foreign Language Film. Roger Ebert stated that "Fellini lore has it that the master made 'Juliet Of The Spirits' as a gift to his wife".

Masina performed in The Madwoman of Chaillot (1969), her first film in English, which also starred Katharine Hepburn. After almost two decades, during which she worked sporadically only in television, Masina appeared in Fellini's Ginger and Fred (1986) with Marcello Mastroianni in which the leads play Italian impersonators of Fred Astaire and Ginger Rogers reuniting for a television special. She then rejected outside offers to attend to her husband's precarious health. Her last film was Jean-Louis Bertuccelli's A Day to Remember (1991). In the late 1960s, Masina hosted a popular radio show, Lettere aperte, in which she addressed correspondence from her listeners. The letters were eventually published in a book. From the 1970s on, she appeared on television. Two performances, in Eleonora (1973) and Camilla (1976), respectively, were particularly acclaimed.

== Death ==
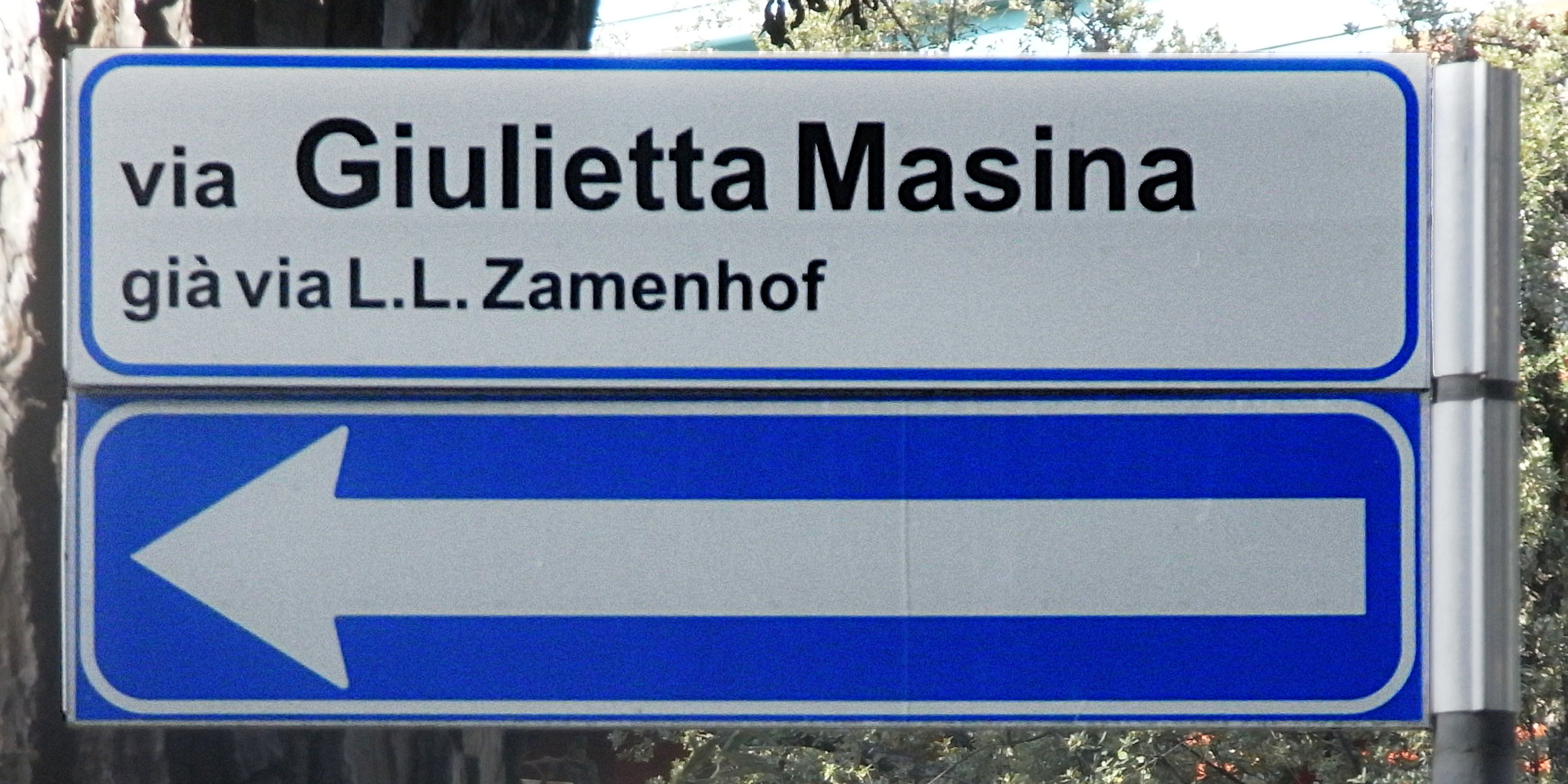
Sign at a street in Rimini which was renamed after Masina

Masina died from lung cancer on 23 March 1994 at age 73, five months after her husband's death on 31 October 1993. For her funeral, she requested that trumpeter Mauro Maur play "La Strada" by Nino Rota, a poignant leitmotif from the film. Masina is buried with Fellini and their son, Pierfederico, in a bronze sepulchre sculpted by Arnaldo Pomodoro in the Monumental Cemetery of Rimini.

== Awards ==
- Italian National Syndicate of Film Journalists: 4 Nastro d'Argento awards
  - Best Actress: Nights of Cabiria (1957), Ginger and Fred (1986)
  - Best Supporting Actress: Without Pity (1948), Variety Lights (1950)
- She was twice nominated for a BAFTA Film Award for Best Foreign Actress.
- David di Donatello: David awards
  - David di Donatello for Best Actress award, for Juliet of the Spirits (1965)
  - David di Donatello for Best Actress award, for Ginger and Fred (1986)
  - Honorary award (1986)
- Cannes Film Festival Best Actress award, for Nights of Cabiria (1957).
- San Sebastián film festival Best Actress award, for Nights of Cabiria (1957)

== Filmography ==
Year	Title	Role	Notes
1946	Paisan	Young woman	debut, (uncredited)
1948	Without Pity	Marcella	
1951	Variety Lights	Melina Amour	
1951	Behind Closed Shutters	Pippo	
1951	Seven Hours of Trouble	Figlia de Romolini	
1951	Cameriera bella presenza offresi...	Ermelinda	
1952	The Shameless Sex	Nadina	
1952	The White Sheik	Cabiria	
1952	Europa '51	Giulietta	
1952	Position Wanted	Paola	
1953	At the Edge of the City	Gina Ilari	
1954	Angels of Darkness	Rosita	
1954	100 Years of Love	The Neighbour at the Rear Window	(segment: "Purificazione")
1954	Via Padova 46	Irene	
1954	La Strada	Gelsomina	
1955	Buonanotte... avvocato!	Carla Santi	
1955	Il bidone	Iris	
1957	Nights of Cabiria	Maria Cabiria Ceccarelli	Cannes Film Festival Award for Best Actress; Silver Shell for Best Actress
1958	Fortunella	Nanda Diotallevi aka Fortunella	
1959	...And the Wild Wild Women	Lina	
1959	Jons und Erdme	Erdme	
1960	The High Life	Doris Putzke	
1965	Juliet of the Spirits	Giulietta Boldrini	
1966	Pardon, Are You For or Against?	Anna	
1967	Don't Sting the Mosquito	Maria Cristina, madre di Rita	
1969	The Madwoman of Chaillot	Gabrielle	
1985	The Feather Fairy	Perinbaba	
1986	Ginger and Fred	Amelia Bonetti "Ginger"	
1991	A Day to Remember	Bertille	(final film role)
2023	Perinbaba: Two Realms	Perinbaba	digitally altered footage from The Feather Fairy.
