= Carrousel international du film de Rimouski =

Children's film festival in Canada

Carrousel international du film de Rimouski is a children's film festival taking place each year in Rimouski, Quebec. The jury is composed of children from various countries.
