= Taos Talking Pictures Film Festival =

Taos Talking Pictures was a non-profit corporation registered with the State of New Mexico in 1994 by actor Joshua Bryant, Phillip Kirk, and attorney Stephen Rose for the purpose of producing The Taos Talking Picture Festival, which premiered in April 1995. After four years, it was named by writer Chris Gore as one of the top ten film festivals in the world. The festival was also notable for offering a Land Grant Prize, which gave the filmmaker with the winning feature-length film five acres of land located Northwest of Taos on nearby Cerro Montoso.

In the unsettled national climate after the September 11 attacks, Taos Talking Pictures found it more and more difficult to raise enough funding to continue its work. It folded The Taos Talking Picture Festival in 2003.
