= Deana Horváthová =

Slovak actress (born 1958)

Deana Jakubisková
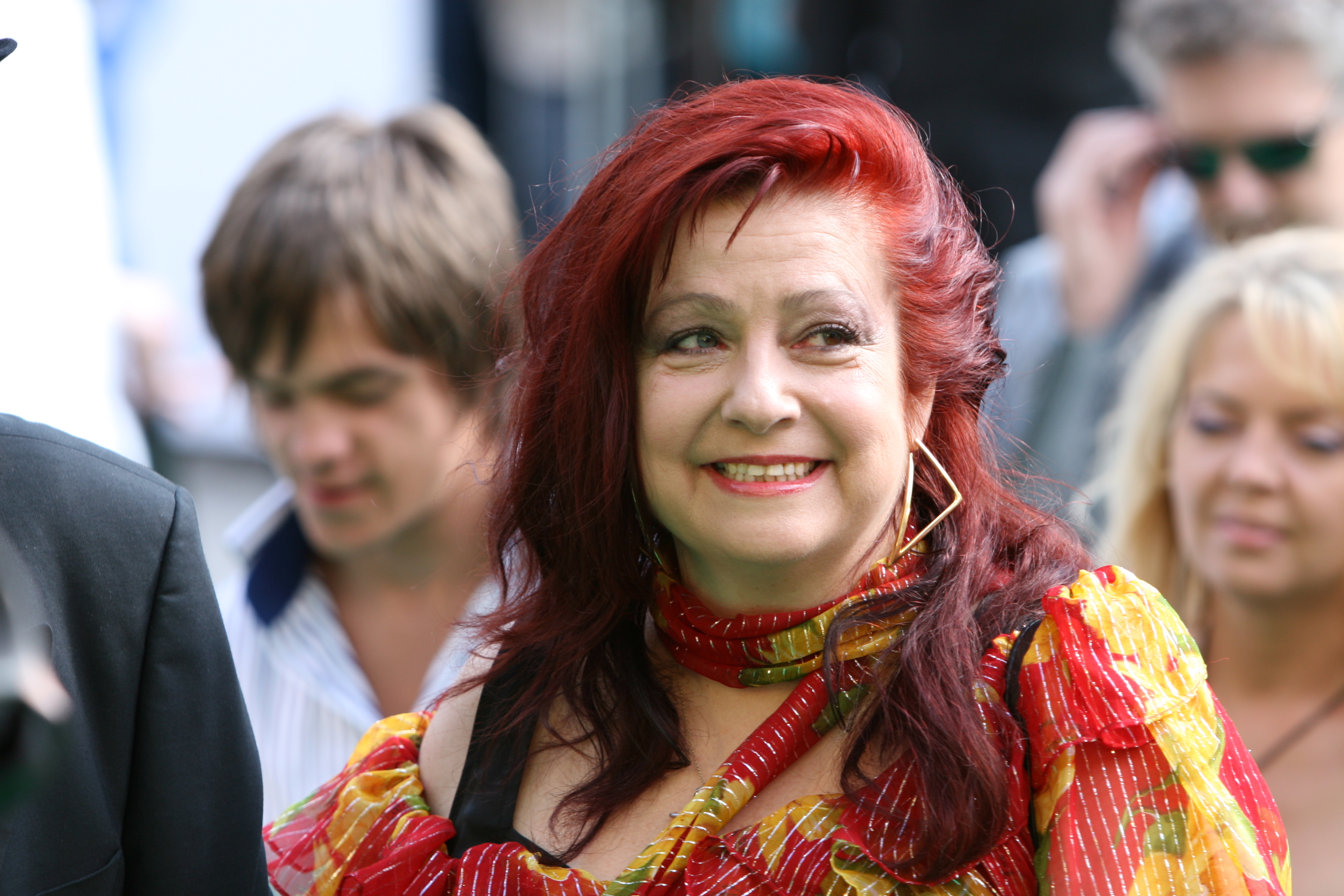
- Jakubisková in 2008
- Born: 11 March 1958 (age 68); Banská Bystrica, Czechoslovakia
- Occupations: Actress and film producer
- Spouse: Juraj Jakubisko (m. 1985; died 2023)
- Children: 1

Deana Jakubisková ( Horváthová, born 11 March 1958) is a Slovak film producer and a former stage and film actress.

== Biography ==
Deana Jakubisková was born on 11 March 1958 in Banská Bystrica. She studied acting at the Academy of Performing Arts in Bratislava, graduating in 1981.

Following her graduation, Jakubisková spent 12 years as an actress of the Slovak National Theatre. Following the dissolution of Czechoslovakia, she moved to Prague with her husband Juraj Jakubisko. In Prague, she briefly acted at the Bez Zábradlí theatre for a year and gradually shifted to the role of film producer.

In addition to stage acting, Jakubisková starred in a number of movies, mainly directed by her husband, including Sitting on a Branch, Enjoying Myself, It's Better to Be Wealthy and Healthy Than Poor and Ill, Bathory and Kajínek.

== Personal life ==
Deana Jakubisková married the director Juraj Jakubisko in 1985. They have a son together.
