= Bogotá Film Festival =

Annual film festival in Colombia

- Location: Bogotá, Colombia
- Founded: 1984
- Awards: Golden Precolumbian Circle
- Website: www.bogocine.com

The Bogotá Film Festival (Spanish: Festival de Cine de Bogotá) is an annual international film festival held in Bogotá, Colombia, inaugurated in 1984. It takes place in late October each year, with most films being in Spanish and very few in English.

The event is an important showcase for independent cinema, with the 26th staging of the annual event in 2009 showcasing 120 films from 32 countries.

== Best Film (Círculo Precolombino de Oro) winners ==
Year	Film	Director	Country
1984	The Bicycle Racer	Lisandro Duque Naranjo	Colombia
1985	A Man of Principle	Francisco Norden	Colombia
1986	Frida Still Life	Paul Leduc	Mexico
1988	Made in Argentina	Juan José Jusid	Argentina
1989	The Lady from the Shanghai Cinema	Guilherme de Almeida Prado	Brazil
1990	Evening Bell	Wu Ziniu	China
1991	Alias 'La Gringa'	Alberto Durant	Peru
1992	Pustynya	Mikhail Kats	Soviet Union
1993	Todos somos estrellas	Felipe Degregori	Peru
1994	The Red Squirrel	Julio Medem	Spain
1995	Salto al vacío	Daniel Calparsoro	Spain
1996	Entre rojas	Azucena Rodríguez	Spain
1997	My Generation	Wilma Labate	Italy
1998	La vendedora de rosas	Víctor Gaviria	Colombia
1999	Tell Me I'm Dreaming	Claude Mouriéras	France
2000	Amores perros	Alejandro González Iñárritu	Mexico
2001	El Bola	Achero Mañas	Spain
2002	Magonia	Ineke Smits	Netherlands
2003	La espera	Aldo Garay	Uruguay
2004	Machuca	Andrés Wood	Chile
2005	Garúa	Gustavo Corrado	Argentina
2005	L'iceberg	Bruno Romy, Dominique Abel, Fiona Gordon	Belgium
2006	The Minder	Rodrigo Moreno	Argentina
2009	The Milk of Sorrow	Claudia Llosa	Peru
2010	Retratos en un mar de mentiras	Carlos Gaviria	Colombia
2011	La mujer de Iván	Francisca Silva	Chile
2012	Juan y Eva	Paula de Luque	Argentina
2013	Florbela	Vicente Alves do Ó	Portugal
2013	The Invisible Collection	Bernard Attal	Brazil
2014	Conducta	Ernesto Daranas	Cuba
2015	La vida después	Pablo Bardauil, Franco Verdoia	Argentina
2016	Freistatt	Marc Brummund	Germany
2017	Kupal	Kazem Mollaie	Iran
2018	O Filme da Minha Vida	Selton Mello	Brazil
2019	Cronofobia	Francesco Rizzi	Switzerland
2020	Grand Cancan	Mikhail Kosyrev-Nesterov	Russia
