= Maria Antonescu =

Romanian socialite and philanthropist (1892–1964)

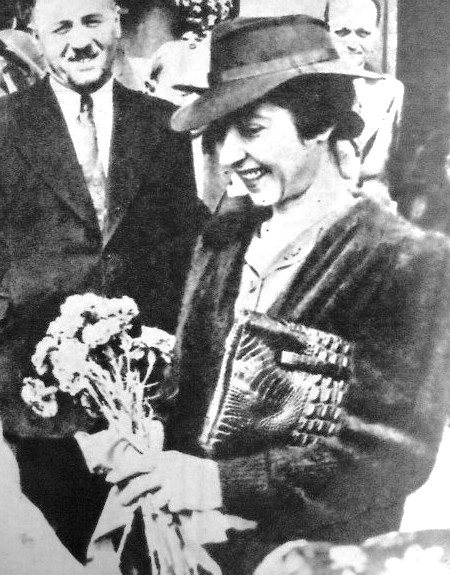
- Antonescu in c. 1941

Wife of the Conducător of Romania
- In office 6 September 1940 – 23 August 1944

President of the Social Works Patronage Council
- In office 20 November 1940^{[a]} – 23 August 1944
- Monarch: Michael I
- Preceded by: None
- Succeeded by: None

Personal details
- Born: Maria Niculescu; 3 November 1892 Calafat, Kingdom of Romania
- Died: 18 October 1964 (aged 71) Bucharest, Romanian People's Republic
- Spouses: Gheorghe Cimbru (d. c. 1919); Guillaume Auguste Joseph Pierre Fueller (m. 1919; div. 1926); Ion Antonescu (m. 1927/8; d. 1946)
- Children: 1
- Nickname: Rica Antonescu
- Criminal information
- Conviction: Embezzlement (1950)
- Penalty: Imprisonment (1950–1955); Deported (from 1955)
- a. formally 10 April 1941

Maria Antonescu (née Niculescu; 3 November 1892 – 18 October 1964), also known as Maria General Antonescu, Maria Mareșal Antonescu, or Rica Antonescu, was a Romanian socialite and philanthropist and the wife of World War II authoritarian prime minister and Conducător Ion Antonescu. A long-time resident of France, she was twice married before her wedding to Antonescu, and became especially known for her leadership of charitable organization grouped in the Social Works Patronage Council organization, having Veturia Goga for her main collaborator. The Council profited significantly from antisemitic policies targeting Romanian Jews, and especially from the deportation of Bessarabian Jews into Transnistria, taking over several hundred million lei resulting from arbitrary confiscations and extortion.

Arrested soon after the August 1944 coup which overthrew her husband, Maria Antonescu was briefly a prisoner of war in the Soviet Union, and, after a period of uncertainty, tried and sentenced by the new communist regime on charges of economic crimes (embezzlement). Imprisoned for five years and afterward included in the Bărăgan deportations, she spent the final years of her life under internal exile at Bordușani.

== Biography ==
=== Early life ===
Born in Calafat, Maria was the daughter of Romanian Army officer Teodor Niculescu, who had fought in the Romanian War of Independence, and his wife Angela (or Anghelina). Angela's sister had married Titică Orăscu, a member of the boyar aristocracy. According to researcher and journalist Lavinia Betea, Teodor Niculescu may have squandered the family fortune, which, she argues, may explain why Maria did not have a dowry. She married Gheorghe Cimbru, a Police officer, with whom she had a son, also known as Gheorghe. The child was physically disabled by poliomyelitis. Cimbru died before 1919, after which date Maria Niculescu is known to have moved to Paris. In July 1919, she married a second time, to businessman Guillaume Auguste Joseph Pierre Fueller, a French Jew.

Having divorced from Fueller in 1926 and married Antonescu, Romania's former military attaché in France, she soon after moved to Bucharest, where her new husband served as Secretary General of the Defense Ministry. The two reportedly met and fell in love before her divorce was final. Sources diverge on the marriage date, which is either indicated as 29 August 1927, or an unspecified day in 1928. Their life as a couple was reportedly marked by Antonescu's rigidity and distaste for the public life. However, as Antonescu reached prominence and earned important political assignments, Maria too became the focus of public attention. Reputedly, when she eventually did become politically important, the upper class viewed her as rather a parvenue.

In 1938, when the relationship between Ion Antonescu and King Carol II degenerated into open conflict, the monarch engineered Ion Antonescu's trial for bigamy, based on charges that she and Fueller had never actually divorced. Assisted by his lawyer Mihai Antonescu, the future Conducător disproved the claim, and the perception that he was being persecuted by an authoritarian ruler reportedly earned him the public's respect. By then, although the officer spoke out against Carol II's extramarital affair with the commoner Elena Lupescu, his own marriage to a divorcée was being treated with contempt by some commentators of the time.

=== Early war years ===
In late 1940, as a result of a major social crisis, the National Legionary State was set up in Romania, and Carol relinquished the throne in favor of the junior king Michael I. Antonescu took over with dictatorial powers, as Conducător, and struck a partnership in government with the fascist Iron Guard. At around this time, Maria became good friends with Veturia Goga, widow of antisemitic Premier Octavian Goga. Their friendship slowly turned into a political lobby, which also involved Veturia (or Sanda) Manuilă, wife of the sociologist Sabin Manuilă, Veturia Barbul, wife of diplomat Gheorghe Barbul, writer Georgeta Cancicov (wife of bureaucrat Mircea Cancicov) and, for a while, Elvira Sima, married to Iron Guard commander Horia Sima. The political wives' circle was in some ways Maria Antonescu's "court", rivaling that of Queen Mother Helen, just as Antonescu's had come to rival the kingly court; for this and other reasons, Queen Helen became especially distrustful of Maria Antonescu's political initiatives. Reportedly, the queen complained to her foreign contacts that the Antonescus were "inconsiderate".

Nevertheless, at the very start of 1941, Maria Antonescu joined the board of Regina Elisabeta Society, a welfare organization chaired by Queen Helen. She also took over a new state-run charity, Sprijinul ("The Support"), which reputedly made her a contender in the conflict opposing her husband to the Guard, before the Legionary Rebellion of early 1941 brought the Guard's downfall. According to Spanish historian Francisco Veiga, her humanitarian effort was endorsed by the more conservative pro-Antonescu factions in reaction to Guardist projects such as Ajutorul Legionar. Sprijinul ensured participation from Veturia Goga. They were also joined by the wife of World War I hero, General Constantin Prezan, and by Sanda Manuilă.

As a mark of emancipation after the 1941 Rebellion, Elvira Sima was formally purged, and accused (falsely) of having embezzled charity funds. From his exile in Nazi Germany, Horia Sima accused the "three Veturias" of having masterminded his and his wife's downfall, through their contacts with Maria Antonescu. The latter was promoted to head of the Social Works Patronage Council, merging all the recognized charities. It had been established by decree on 20 November 1940, but received its charter only on 12 June 1942. It specified that the council was "a State institution with its own juridical person and patrimony", whose members ex officio included government ministers and the Patriarch of All Romania; others were designated by Conducător decrees. As reported by Revista de Igienă Socială (the Romanian eugenicists' review), "its vast program" included "coordinating public and private benefit institutions in the realm of welfare, guiding and controlling private charities, and lastly taking the initiative in setting up new social welfare establishments." The council was especially interested in "protecting the working class", spending a reported 100 million lei on school cafeterias, and some 1 million lei on free or subsidized soup kitchens.

The council's establishment coincided with Romania's participation in Operation Barbarossa, which signified the recovery of Bessarabia and Northern Bukovina, and the occupation of Transnistria. Awarded its own badge (the Blue Cross), the Council then became a direct competitor to Queen Helen's earlier work in welfare and relief, as well as a would-be replacement for the Romanian Red Cross. Its activities were promptly covered and advertised by the regime's official propaganda. Beyond simply directing the work of private welfare institutions, the council was suspected of wanting to subvert them and take over their investment. It openly confiscated the patrimony of older welfare organizations, such as Umanitatea, owner of the girls' colony in Slănic.

During the early months of 1941, the Iron Guard having been successfully repressed, Maria Antonescu and Veturia Goga coaxed support for the regime from the old establishment parties (although nominally outlawed since Carol II's rule, these were cautiously tolerated by Antonescu). Official newspapers publicized their visit to Topoloveni, a former fief of the National Peasants' Party (PNȚ), where they met with PNȚ leader Ion Mihalache. The event was organized by Admiral Dan Zaharia, who was simultaneously a PNȚ cadre and a friend of her husband's. Although she refrained from overt political statements, Maria Antonescu gave praise to Mihalache as a community and civil society leader. The pro-Allied PNȚ leader, Iuliu Maniu, saw in this an attempt by Antonescu to co-opt Mihalache as a minister. His immediate response was to dissuade Mihalache from "compromising himself" with such affiliations. For her part, Maria Antonescu alternated such displays of traditionalism with the public endorsement for fascist causes. In July 1941, she was an official guest at the Anti-Masonry Exhibit in Bucharest.

=== Antisemitic plunder and spoils of war ===
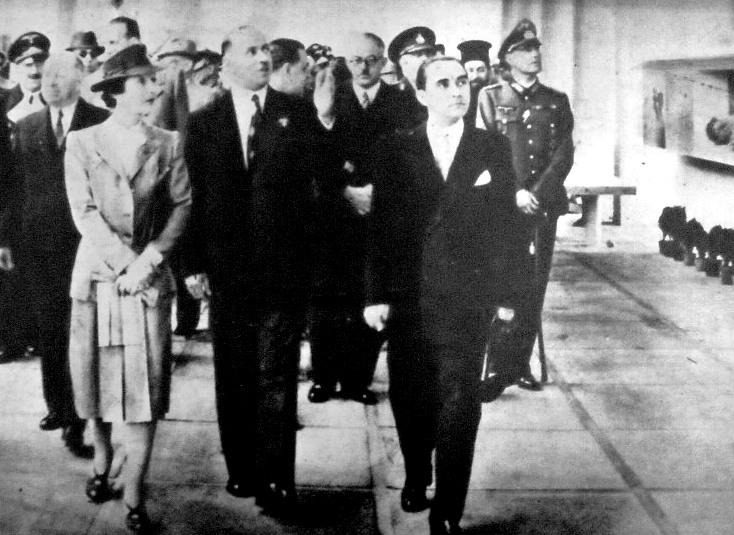
Maria Antonescu with Gheorghe Alexianu (governor of Transnistria), Mihai Antonescu and Nazi German diplomats, at the "Transnistria Exhibit" (1941 or 1942)

With the continuation of war on the Eastern Front, the Social Works Patronage Council took it upon itself to look after the needs of first-line soldiers and their families, as well as to protect a special category of vulnerable individuals: the IOVR (invalids, orphans, widows). By December 1941, it had raised and spent some 25 million lei for the needs of men under arms and 138 million for the wounded; 9.7 million for families of active duty soldiers, and 17 million for invalids, widows or orphans.

Romania's participation in the war came with the generalization of antisemitic measures and the massive deportations of the Jews to occupied Transnistria, a process initiated by her husband, and marked by events in which she herself was implicated (see Holocaust in Romania). In October 1941, Wilhelm Filderman, head of the Jewish Communities' Federation, sent her and her husband letters of protest, stressing that the deportations were tantamount to death—messages which went unanswered. In November, after the ghetto in Chișinău was sacked and its population deported to Transnistria, the authorities set aside confiscated property for the Patronage Council, for the Red Cross, for Romanian hospitals and the Romanian Army.

Such arbitrary confiscations inaugurated a chain of supply for the Patronage Council. In August 1942, the Jewish entrepreneurs Max Auschnitt and Franz von Neumann donated 50 million Swiss francs to the same charity, a precautionary measure which may have played a part in the decision to indefinitely postpone transports from Romania to Nazi extermination camps. This event was notably recounted in a testimony by Ioan Mocsony-Stârcea, a member of King Michael's entourage. The same month, Jewish Affairs Commissioner Radu Lecca, whose office implied regular extortion of the Jewish community, collected 1.2 billion lei from the ghettos through the government-controlled Central Jewish Office, of which 400 million were redirected toward Maria Antonescu's charities. The total sum passed by the Central Jewish Office toward the patronage Council exceeded 780 million lei.

This type of abuse also touched other communities. Thus, among the special provisions ordered by Governor Gheorghe Alexianu and affecting Ukrainian peasants in Transnistria, one set produce quotas for Maria Antonescu's project, as hospital meals for wounded soldiers. Having herself reserved a special Blue Cross tax from cinema revenues nationally, Maria Antonescu also looked into financing a fleet of traveling cinemas. It was furnished with spoils of war from Odessa Film Studio.

Lecca himself later stated: "The need for extra-budgetary money was continuously rising", arguing that, in addition to pressures from the part of Mihai Antonescu and German Ambassador Manfred Freiherr von Killinger, "Mrs. Antonescu asked for money for her patronage". Occasionally, however, Maria Antonescu intervened with her husband to alleviate some antisemitic measures. She is thus believed to have persuaded the Conducător not to create a special ghetto in Iași (where the survivors of the 1941 pogrom were supposed to be confined), in exchange for which local Jews provided the Patronage Council with 5 million lei. Reputedly, she and Veturia Goga also mediated between the Conducător and Petru Groza, left-wing activist and leader of the clandestine Ploughmen's Front, whose stance against the regime later made him the Antonescu regime's political prisoner.

It was also as a result of her intercession that Romania's Chief Rabbi, Alexandru Șafran, obtained the reversal of an order to nationalize and desecrate Bucharest's Sevastopol Jewish Cemetery. However, Șafran also left an account of her unwillingness to provide water and milk for children and infants confined in Cernăuți en route to Transnistria. Maria Antonescu is believed to have eventually heeded other calls, and to have pressured Ion Antonescu into allowing Jewish deportees from Dorohoi to return home. She is also credited with having collected medicine, food, clothing and window panes to be sent into Transnistria, and to have accepted Patronage Council donations in exchange for allowing other Jews to escape.

=== Detention, sentencing and final years ===
The Antonescus' status changed dramatically after King Michael and opposition forces carried out the August 1944 Coup, arresting the Conducător and taking Romania out of its Axis alliance. Her son Gheorghe Cimbru died at Călimănești on 29 August or 10 September. Reportedly, his death was suicide, caused by the distress he felt over his adoptive father's downfall. Having fled to Băile Herculane, Maria Antonescu was arrested in Căzănești, where she had been offered refuge by a close friend of her personal secretary. According to one account, she had asked for protection from Queen Mother Helen who, as a noted adversary, refused to grant it.

In March 1945, Maria Antonescu was taken into custody by the Soviet occupation forces, and, like her husband before her, was transported into Soviet territory, where she was only interrogated once. They were not told of each other, even though their cells at Moscow's Lubyanka are said to have shared a wall. From November 1945, the leftist Union of Patriots issued calls for her and Veturia Goga to be tried in Romanian custody. Maria Antonescu returned in April 1946, at the same time as her husband. She was submitted to interrogations by Interior Ministry Secretary, Romanian Communist Party member and public investigator Avram Bunaciu, who recorded her views on Antonescu's political choices. Part of the inquiry focused on Maria Antonescu's own involvement. When asked about her support for a war of aggression, which Bunaciu defined as "a war of plunder", she replied: "When I started [work with charities] there was no war. What was I to do? Not to keep going? I originally started because of all the misery in the Romanian land." She denied accusations of having participated in extortion, but admitted to having received funds from Lecca, and replied that she had never considered providing aid to Transnistrian deportees because Jews had "enough funds", and denied knowledge that Jews had been imprisoned in concentration camps.

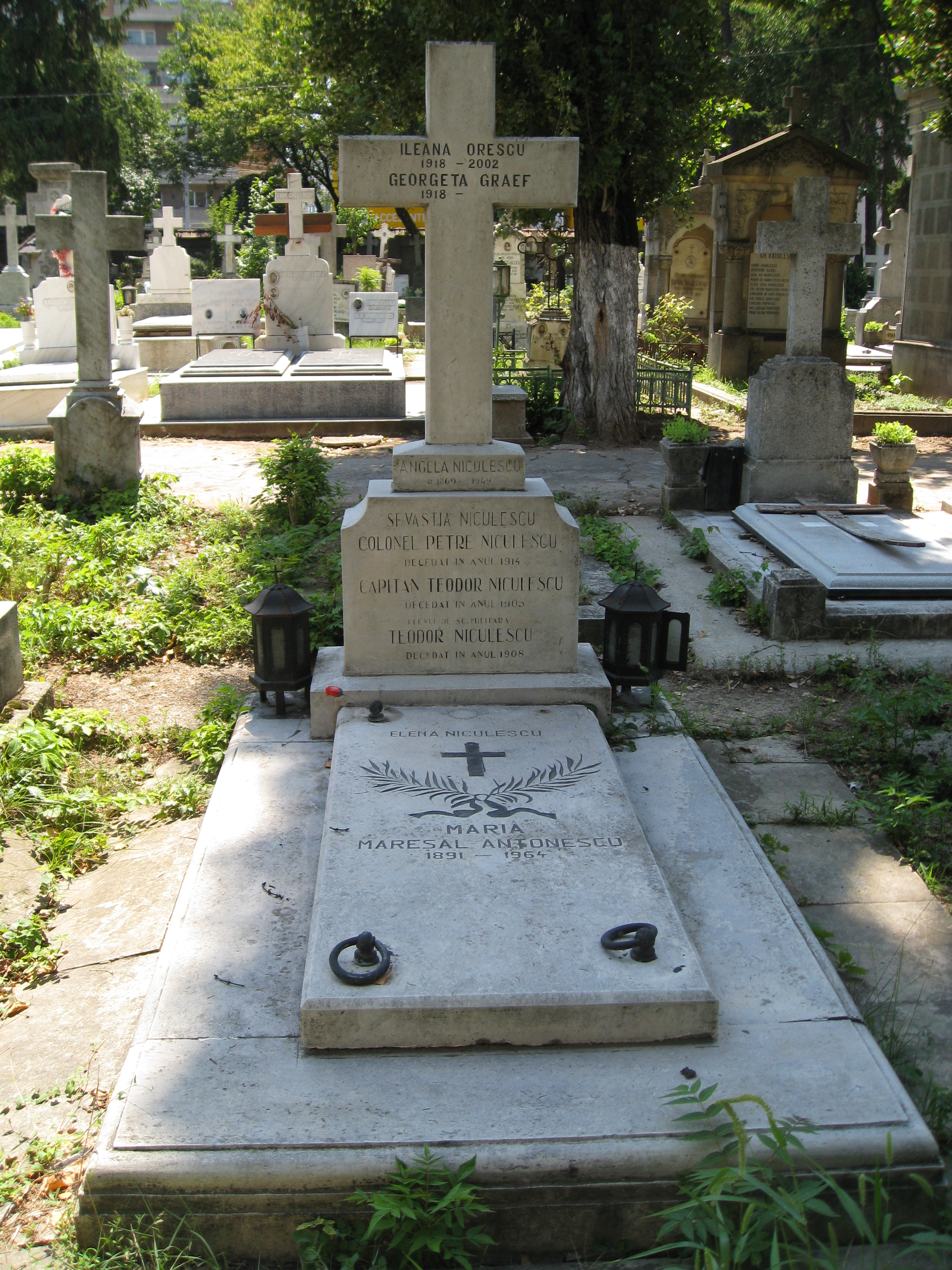
Maria Antonescu's grave in Bellu cemetery

According to conflicting accounts, she was simply allowed to go free, or detained at Malmaison prison before her declining health made the authorities commit her to Nicolae Gh. Lupu's clinic, ultimately assigning her house arrest in a Bucharest lodging she shared with her mother. She lacked the means to support herself, and was cared for by her friends and family. After his People's Court trial and just prior to his June 1946 execution for war crimes, Ion Antonescu met his wife one final time, handing her his watch with the request that she imagine "it is my heart beating", and never let it stop.

Again arrested in 1950, she was indicted by the communist regime and found guilty of "bringing disaster to the country" and economic crimes in general, and of embezzlement in particular. From 1950 to 1955, she was imprisoned at Mislea, a former convent in Cobia. She was kept there under the rules of "in-secrecy" solitary confinement, and, according to the account of one of her fellow inmates, allowed to step out of her cell only at night, when she would collect and smoke the cigarette butts discarded by the guards.

After her release from prison, Maria Antonescu was assigned "obligatory domicile" on the Bărăgan Plain, within a wave of Bărăgan deportations. While in Bordușani, Ialomița County, she met and befriended fellow women detainees from the White Squadron. Another witness to her deportation was engineer Eugen Ionescu, who later escaped to Australia. Ionescu later retold his conversations with the Conducător's wife, specifically her complaint that Ion Antonescu had been refused trial by the International Military Tribunal.

The Ialomița area is characterized by weather extremes. Maria Antonescu complained that snowdrifts prevented her from leaving her home in winter, and spent much of her time knitting. According to one witness account, she was also held in Giurgeni, and worked for the local state farm's cafeteria. She was by then afflicted with a debilitating heart condition, and, after petitioning the authorities, was briefly allowed to return to Bucharest for treatment in 1958 or 1959. Maria Antonescu was again in Bordușani from 1959 to 1964, when a turn for the worse saw her internment to a specialist clinic, and then at the Colțea Hospital, where she was cared for by a friend doctor. She died there as the result of a third heart attack, and was buried in Bellu cemetery, in a tomb owned by distant relatives.

== Legacy ==
The Antonescus were ktitors of three Romanian Orthodox churches in separate Bucharest areas: Mărgeanului Church in Rahova, Dămăroaia Church, and the Saints Constantine and Helena Church in Muncii, where they are depicted in a mural. Maria herself also founded Sfânta Maria Church of Ghencea and contributed significantly to constructing Delea Nouă Church. In 1941, after floods took a toll on Argeș County, the two founded Antonești, a model village in Corbeni (partly built by Ukrainian prisoners of war, and later passed into state property). Although her picture was a regular presence on the front pages of newspapers and magazines, Maria Antonescu was nevertheless perceived by some of her contemporaries as a withdrawn and secondary figure. Accounts of her life were provided by various public figures, including Princess Ileana (who met her shortly before leaving the country in 1947) and anti-communist members of the Romanian diaspora. Some mentions of her were made in Bénie sois-tu, prison ("Bless You, Prison"), a best-selling book of memoirs by Nicole Valéry Grossu, a former Mislea inmate and defector to France.

During her husband's years in power, the official press made Maria Antonescu the object of reverence, prompting speculation that she was vying for popularity with Queen Helen. She was the sole subject of two nationally released films, and an obligatory presence on weekly newsreels. Another propaganda film about Romanian charities was censored and had to be redone, because officials felt that it shed too much positive light on the Red Cross, and not enough on the Blue Cross. Her omnipresence in press reports alienated the public, and, in 1943, she acknowledged that the society, especially "the lower class", was becoming overexposed to her Blue Cross propaganda, and that "the workers are turning against the Patronage Council". According to Revista de Igienă Socială, Antonescu's Council was highly inefficient at targeting people in need, "especially so in the provinces", and its generous welfare program, that "promoted vice", ought to have been replaced with conditional cash transfers. The council's soup kitchens, Revista argued, were "a desolate spectacle".

By then, underground propaganda was depicting Antonescu as a new and less qualified version of the infamous Elena Lupescu, who had been Carol II's mistress and string-puller. According to writer Ion Caraion, the ridicule she was subjected to by adversaries of the Antonescu regime was unwittingly reflected by the press organ Timpul. Unknown hands subverted the caption of a photograph showing her, Veturia Goga and Sanda Manuilă visiting a soldier's hospital, to read as if they were having intercourse with the wounded.

Before his death, Antonescu addressed his wife a final letter, in which he restated his claim to innocence and belief that posterity would exonerate him. He expressed a wish that Maria withdraw to an Orthodox monastery, adding: "There you will find the peace necessary for the soul and the piece of bread which today you cannot afford." The Cobia nunnery imprisonment, British historian Dennis Deletant notes, was "an ironic twist" on this last wish. The original was not preserved and did not reach Maria Antonescu, but its text was copied by Titus Stoica, the Conducător's attorney, a version which he hid inside an armchair just prior to being himself arrested by communist authorities. Reportedly, Stoica forgot its location, and the document was only uncovered decades later by an upholsterer.

In 2002, some 12 years after the Romanian Revolution overthrew communism, actress Margareta Pogonat portrayed Maria Antonescu in Binecuvântată fii, închisoare, a film directed by Nicolae Mărgineanu (based on, and named after, Valéry Grossu's book, and having Maria Ploae for its main protagonist). According to Mărgineanu, Pogonat accepted "the silent, almost figurative role" having as her motivation the fact that "she herself was imprisoned at the age of 16, because her parents were landowners."

The Antonescu estate was passed into state property, in accordance with provisions for war criminals. This included the watch handed by Ion Antonescu to his wife, which was confiscated from her minutes after she had received it. In 2008, Maria Antonescu's collateral inheritors stated a claim on the couple's villa in Predeal. It was rejected by a Brașov tribunal, which cited the original confiscation law.

== Honours ==
=== Foreign honours ===
- Nazi Germany: Order of Social Welfare, Special Class
