= List of Polish films of the 1980s =

The following films were produced in Poland in the 1980s.

Title	Director	Cast	Genre	Notes
1980
The Constant Factor	Krzysztof Zanussi			Won the Jury Prize at the 1980 Cannes Film Festival
The Moth	Tomasz Zygadło			Entered into the 12th Moscow International Film Festival
Olympics 40	Andrzej Kotkowski			
The Orchestra Conductor	Andrzej Wajda	John Gielgud, Andrzej Seweryn		Seweryn won the Silver Bear for Best Actor at Berlin
1981
Blind Chance	Krzysztof Kieślowski	Bogusław Linda		
Dreszcze	Wojciech Marczewski			Won the Jury Grand Prix at the 32nd Berlin International Film Festival
Fever	Agnieszka Holland	Barbara Grabowska		Grabowska won the Silver Bear for Best Actress at Berlin
From a Far Country: Pope John Paul II	Krzysztof Zanussi	Sam Neill, Christopher Cazenove, Lisa Harrow	Biographical	
Hands Up!	Jerzy Skolimowski			Screened at the 1981 Cannes Film Festival
Man of Iron	Andrzej Wajda			Won the Palme d'Or at the 1981 Cannes Film Festival
1982
Interrogation	Ryszard Bugajski			Banned for 8 years, entered into the 1990 Cannes Film Festival
Koncert	Michał Tarkowski [pl]	Features filmed performances of Perfect, Republika, TSA, Maanam, and Brygada Kryzys	Documentary	Shows the Rockowisko [pl] music festival.
Moonlighting	Jerzy Skolimowski			Entered into the 1982 Cannes Film Festival
1983
Austeria				
Danton	Andrzej Wajda	Gérard Depardieu, Wojciech Pszoniak	Biographical	
Pastorale heroica	Henryk Bielski			Entered into the 13th Moscow International Film Festival
1984
The Year of the Quiet Sun	Krzysztof Zanussi			
Przeklęte oko proroka				
1985
Woman in a Hat	Stanisław Różewicz			Entered into the 14th Moscow International Film Festival
1986
By Touch	Magdalena Łazarkiewicz			
A Chronicle of Amorous Accidents	Andrzej Wajda	Paulina Młynarska, Piotr Wawrzyńczak, Magdalena Wójcik	Drama	
1987
Blind Chance	Krzysztof Kieślowski			Made in 1981, released in 1987. Screened at the 1987 Cannes Film Festival
Hero of the Year	Feliks Falk			Entered into the 15th Moscow International Film Festival
Kingsajz	Juliusz Machulski			
The Mother of Kings	Janusz Zaorski			Won a Silver Bear at Berlin
On the Silver Globe	Andrzej Żuławski			Screened at the 1988 Cannes Film Festival
1988
And the Violins Stopped Playing	Alexander Ramati	Horst Buchholz, Didi Ramati, Piotr Polk	War drama	
Prisoner of Rio	Lech Majewski	Steven Berkoff, Paul Freeman, Peter Firth	Drama	
A Short Film About Killing	Krzysztof Kieślowski			Entered into the 1988 Cannes Film Festival
A Short Film About Love	Krzysztof Kieślowski	Grażyna Szapołowska		
1989
Inventory	Krzysztof Zanussi			Entered into the 16th Moscow International Film Festival
The Last Ferry	Waldemar Krzystek			Screened at the 1990 Cannes Film Festival
A Tale of Adam Mickiewicz's 'Forefathers' Eve'	Tadeusz Konwicki			Entered into the 16th Moscow International Film Festival
