= 18th Locarno Film Festival =

Film festival in Locarno, Switzerland

- Location: Locarno, Switzerland
- Founded: 1946
- Awards: Golden Sail: Four in the Morning directed by Anthony Simmons
- Artistic director: Vincio Berretta
- Festival date: Opening: 21 July 1965; Closing: 1 August 1965
- Website: Locarno Film Festival

Locarno Film Festival
- 19th 17th

The 18th Locarno Film Festival was held from 21 July to 1 August 1965 in Locarno, Switzerland. No Hollywood films were shown at the festival this year, though American independent film Who's Crazy? was screened. It featured actors from the New York-based Living Theatre troupe when they were in Belgium. Some even hitchhiked in to be at the festival in Switzerland. This was the last year with long-time festival director Vincio Berretta.

The festival's top prize, the Golden Sail, was awarded to Four in the Morning directed by Anthony Simmons.

== Official Sections ==
The following films were screened in these sections:

=== Main Program ===
Main Program / Feature Films In Competition

English Title	Original Title	Director(s)	Year	Production Country
Ascending	Aarohi	Tapan Sinha	1965	India
The Road	Al Tarik	Hossam El Dine Mostafa		United Arab Emirates
Age of Illusions	Almodozasok Kora	Istvan Szabo	1964	Hungary
Havoc in Heaven	Danao Tiangong	Wan Laiming		China
The Distant Wind: 1. in the Deep Parco	El Viento Distante: 1. En El Parco Hondo	Salomon Laiter		Mexico
The Distant Wind: 2. August	El Viento Distante: 2. Tarde De Agosto	Manuel Michel		Mexico
The Distant Wind: 3. Meeting	El Viento Distante: 3. Encuentro	Sergio Véjar		Mexico
In this Town There are No Thieves	En Este Pueblo No Hay Ladrones	Alberto Isaac	1965	Mexico
Four In The Morning		Anthony Simmons	1965	Great Britain
Fraternal Amazon	Fraternelle Amazone	Paul Lambert		Switzerland, France
People with Me	Gente Conmigo	Jorge Darnell	1965	Argentina
Before Balevana	Hor Balevana	Uri Zohar	1964	Israel
Fists in the Pocket	I Pugni In Tasca	Marco Bellocchio	1965	Italia
The Possessed	La Donna Del Lago	Luigi Bazzoni, Francesco Rossellini	1965	Italia
The Merry World of Leopold Z	La Vie Heureuse De Leopold Z	Gilles Carle	1965	Canada
Grace	Le Coup De Grace	Jean Cayrol, Claude Durand	1965	France, Canada
The Kiss	O Beijo	Flavio Tambellini	1965	Brazil
The Organ		Štefan Uher	1965	Czech Republic
The Girl and the Echo	Paskutine Atostogu Diena	Arünas Zebriünas	1964	Russia
Pearls of the Deep	Perlicki Na Dne	Jiri Menzel, Jan Nemec, Věra Chytilová, Evald Schorm, Jaromil Jireš	1965	Czech Republic
Tokyo Olympiad		Kon Ichigawa	1965	Japan
Run for Your Wife	Una Moglie Americana	Gian luigi Polidoro	1965	Italia, France
Who's Crazy?		Thomas White, Allan Zion		USA
Life Once Again	Zcie Raz Jeszcze	Janusz Morgenstern	1965	Poland

Main Program / Short Films In Competition

Original Title	English Title	Director(s)	Year	Production Country
A Love Thing		Barry Price		USA
Architecture U.S.A.		Tibor Hirsch		USA
Aysa	Austa	Jorge Sanjinés		Bolivia
Derwent Runs Down To The Sea		Don Anderson		Australia
Duckwood Short Term Sheriff		Dave Tendlar		USA
Dunoyer De Segonzac		Dominique Lepeuve, François Reichenbach		France
Face Of America		Ed Emschwiller		USA
Gadmouse Apprentice Good Fairy		Connie Rasinsky		USA
I Wonder Why...		Fredric Abeles, Stephe Segal		USA
Il Mar Rosso, Paradiso Dei Pescatori	The Red Sea, Paradiso Dei Pescatori	Abdel Helim Nasr		United Arab Emirates
Kraftstoff	Fuel	Hugo Niebeling		Germany
Le Mystere Koumiko	LE MYTHEROS KUMUM			France
Le Petite Port	The Small Port	Günter Sachs		Germany
Maly Osud	A Little Fate	Jiri Jirasek		Czech Republic
Mamma Undrar Hur Loppan Mar	Mom Wonders How the Flea Mar	Gustav Wiklund		Sudan
Metamorfoza	Metamorphosis	Vladimir Jutrisa, Aleksandar Marks		Yugoslavia
Niayes		Ousmane Sembène		Senegal
Noi Insistiamo	We Insist	Gianni Amico		Italia
Operation Snowdrop		O. H. Merchant		Pakistan
Parvat Mandir	Mountain Temple	Biren Das		India
Pas D'Autre Choix	No Other Choice	Krishna Singh		
Pierwsky, Drugi, Trzeci	First, Second, Third	Daniel Szczechura		Poland
Pink Pajamas		Friz Freleng		USA
Plyna Tratwy	Raft	Wladyslaw Slesicki		Poland
Spitzberg		Ernesto Laura		Italia
The Days Of Dylan Thomas		Rollie Mc Kenna		USA
The Pink Phink		Friz Freleng		USA
Trzy Po Trzy	Three by Three	Stefan Janik		Poland
Un Delitto	A Crime	Camillo Bazzoni		Italia

=== Out of Competition (Fuori Concorso) ===
Main Program / Feature Films Out of Competition

Original Title	English Title	Director(s)	Year	Production Country
Casanova 70		Mario Monicelli	1965	Italia
Reflejos	Highlights	Néstor Lovera		Venezuela
Tarahumara		Luis Alcoriza	1965	Mexico
The Knack And How To Get It		Richard Lester	1965	Great Britain

Main Program / Short Films Out of Competition

Original Title	English Title	Director(s)	Year	Production Country
Art Et Jeunesse (Exposition Nationale Suisse De Lausanne)	Art and Youth (Swiss National Exhibition of Lausanne)	Ciné-journal suisse		Switzerland
Locarno, Cite De La Paix	Locarno, Quotes Peace			Switzerland
Sarabande Et Variations	Sarabande and Variations	Gilbert Vuillème		Switzerland

=== Special Sections - Tribute To ===
Tribute To Jiri Trnka
Original Title	English Title	Director(s)	Year	Production Country
Archandel Gabriel A Pani Husa	Archandel Gabriel and Mrs. Husa	Jiri Trnka	1964	Czech Republic
Arie Prerie	ARIE PREIRIE	Jiri Trnka	1949	Czech Republic
Bajaja	T	Jiri Trnka	1950	Czech Republic
Cisaruv Slavic		Jiri Trnka	1948	Czech Republic
Dobry Vojak Svejk	Good Soldier Svojk	Jiri Trnka		Czech Republic
Dva Mrazici	Frost	Jiri Trnka	1954	Czech Republic
Kyberneticka Babicka		Jiri Trnka	1962	Czech Republic
Ruka	Hand	Jiri Trnka	1965	Czech Republic
Sen Noci Svatojanske	Midsn Reman's Dream	Jiri Trnka	1959	Czech Republic
Spalick		Jiri Trnka	1947	Czech Republic
Stare Povesty Ceske	Old	Jiri Trnka	1952	Czech Republic
Vasen	Left	Jiri Trnka	1961	Czech Republic
Vesely Cirkus	Vesely Circus	Jiri Trnka	1951	Czech Republic
Tribute To Manoel De Oliveira
A Caça	Hunting	Manoel de Oliveira	1964	Portugal
Acto Da Primavera	Act Gives Spring	Manoel de Oliveira	1962	Portugal
Aniki-Bóbó	Bob	Manoel de Oliveira	1942	Portugal
Douro, Fiana Fluvial	DOURO, FAINA FLUVIAL	Manoel de Oliveira	1931	Portugal
O Pao	Go	Manoel de Oliveira	1959	Portugal
O Pintor E A Cidade	The Painter and the City	Manoel de Oliveira	1956	Portugal

== Official Awards ==
=== International Jury, feature films ===
- Golden Sail: FOUR IN THE MORNING by Anthony Simmons
- Silver Sail: ALMODOZASOK KORA by Istvan Szabo, FISTS IN THE POCKET by Marco Bellocchio
- Silver Sail for the Mexican Selection: EN ESTE PUEBLO NO HAY LADRONES by Manuel Michel, Salomon Laiter, and Alberto Issac
- Majority’s Silver Sail: The Girl and the Echo by Arünas Zebriünas
- Silver Sail, special award: THE ORGAN by Stfan Uher

=== International Jury, short films ===
- Out of Competition Prize, short films: LE MYSTERE KOUMIKO by Chris Marker
- Golden Sail, Short Films: NON INSISTIAMO by Gianni Amico
- Silver Sail, short films: METAMORFOZA by Vladimir Jutrisa and Aleksandar Marks
- Mention for the young senegal cinema: NIAYES by Ousmane Sembène

=== Interfilm Jury ===
- Interfilm Award: AAROHI by Tapon Sinha

=== FIPRESCI Jury ===
- International critics award: PEARLS OF THE DEEP by Jiri Menzel, Jaromil Jires, Evald Schorm, Vera Chytilova and Jan Nemec

=== Youth Jury ===
- Pièce d’or (Grand Prix), feature films: FOUR IN THE MORNING by Anthony Simmons
- Perle (prix spécial du jury), feature films: PERLICKI NA DNE by Jiri Menzel, Jaromil Jires, Evald Schorm, Vera Chytilova and Jan Nemec
- Youth Jury Mention, feature films: HOR BALEVANA by Uri Zohar,L’AMOUR A LA MER by Guy Gilles
- Pièce d’or, short films: LA BRÛLURE DE MILLE SOLEILS by Pierre Kast
- Youth Jury Mention, short films: THE PINK PHINK by Fritz Freleng,NIAYES by Ousmane Sembène
