= Milka Zimková =

Slovak actress (1951–2023)

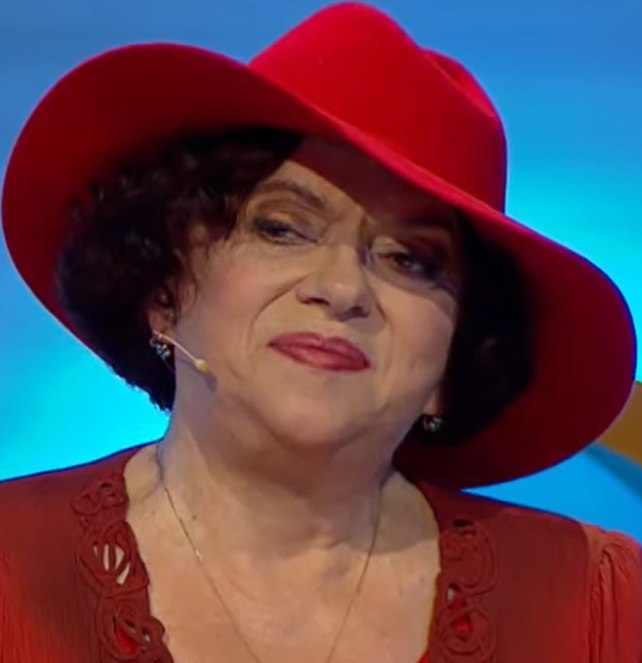
- Zimková in 2022
- Born: Emília Lešková; 1 August 1951; Okružná, Czechoslovakia
- Died: 30 May 2023 (aged 71); Bratislava, Slovakia
- Education: Academy of Performing Arts in Bratislava
- Occupation(s): Actress and screenwriter
- Spouse: Ondrej Zimka
- Children: 2

Emília "Milka" Zimková (née Lešková; 1 August 1951 – 30 May 2023) was a Slovak actress and screenwriter. She wrote the script and acted in one of the biggest Slovak comedy blockbusters, She Grazed Horses on Concrete.

== Biography ==
Emília Lešková was born on 1 August 1951, in the village of Okružná, close to the city of Prešov. She was interested in acting from her early childhood. She studied acting at the Academy of Performing Arts in Bratislava, graduating in 1973.

With the exception of a year-long stint at the theatre of Trnava right after graduation, she was a freelance artist for her entire life. She mainly performed monodrama pieces under the stage name Milka Zimková.

Zimková retired from acting in the 1990s. Towards the end of her life, she promoted conspiracy theories and pro-Russian narratives in the Russian invasion of Ukraine. She died at a hospital in Bratislava on 30 May 2023, at the age of 71. Her death was announced by her ex-husband, the painter Ondrej Zimka and their daughter Milina Zimková.

== Filmography ==
=== Screenplays ===
- She Grazed Horses on Concrete (published as a novel in 1980, filmed directed by Štefan Uher released in 1982)
- Ticket to Paradise (1983, directed by Štefan Uher)
- ...Crying for the Moon (1995, sequel to She Grazed Horses on Concrete, directed by Stanislav Párnický)

=== Acting ===
- 1978 – Zlaté časy (Verona)
- 1979 – Kamarátky (Rempová)
- 1980 – Živá voda (Hana Múčková)
- 1981 – Kosenie Jastrabej lúky (Katarína)
- 1982 – She Grazed Horses on Concrete (Johana Ovšena)
- 1983 – Zrelá mladosť (Vavjaková)
- 1984 – Návrat Jána Petru (Elza Petrová)
- 1985 – Forget Mozart (Marie Luisa)
- 1987 – Sedmé nebe (Čermáková)
- 1987 – Proč (sprievodkyňa vlaku)
- 1989 – Montiho čardáš (Kubova žena)
- 1995 – ...Crying for the Moon (Johana Ovšena)
