= She Grazed Horses on Concrete =

- DVD
- Directed by: Štefan Uher
- Written by: Short stories: Milka Zimková; Screenplay: Milka Zimková; Štefan Uher
- Starring: Milka Zimková; Veronika Jeníková; Marie Logojdová; Peter Staník; Ľubomír Paulovič
- Cinematography: Stanislav Szomolányi
- Edited by: Maxmilián Remeň
- Music by: Svetozár Štúr
- Release date: 22 December 1982
- Running time: 78 minutes
- Countries: Slovakia; Czechoslovakia
- Language: Slovak

She Grazed Horses on Concrete (Slovak: Pásla kone na betóne) is a 1982 Slovak-Czech comedy-drama film exploring themes of female sexual mores and abortion, holding out in society balanced with comedy and irony in proportions that instantly made it one of the biggest domestic blockbusters in Slovak cinema.

A quarter of a century later, its DVD release sold out within weeks. The film, directed by the reputed Štefan Uher, made the women at its center stage stand for humankind as matter-of-factly as much of Central European filmmaking had been portraying men's worlds, the quiet turnaround never even became a talking point. It was also the first film that employed a regional variety of the language that would be naturally used where the story took place, which provided an additional layer of humor whose novelty had people rolling in the aisles.

Its baffling title quotes a verse from a fresh folk song about a woman striving to accomplish impossible feats. Attempts to render it in English resulted in the film being shown and quoted under a range of titles that have included She Kept Crying for the Moon, She Kept Asking for the Moon, A Ticket to Heaven (also the erroneous A Ticket to the Heaven), and Concrete Pastures.

The film was entered into the 13th Moscow International Film Festival where it won the Silver Prize.

== Plot ==
Johanka (Milka Zimková) had a fling with a well-digger (Peter Vonš) she had not met before and who, she was most likely certain, would never be around again. About 18 years later, she is a single woman respected and recognized at the local co-op farm where she works − except that it does not translate to the same compensation for her as for the male workers − who keeps turning down her lifelong suitor, friend and neighbor Berty (Peter Staník). Her 18-year-old daughter Paulína (Veronika Jeníková) commutes by bus to work in the nearby city, which gives the village gossips the occasional opportunity to remind her of her unknown father. A resultant conflict with her mother makes Paulína take up residence in the city.

Johanka, prodded by her also-single friend Jozefka (Marie Logojdová) who maintains that a woman without a man is nothing, begins to woo the new teacher Jarek (Jiří Klepl) only to discover later that he is married. Paulína, in the meantime, loses her virginity to the soldier Jirka (Ivan Klečka) who promptly makes himself scarce. Johanka fails to consider that she actually has a better life than some of her married neighbors, begins to see abortion or marriage as Paulína's only options, and places personals on her behalf. Although Štefan (Ľubomír Paulovič), one of the men who respond, turns out to be less than ideal, Paulína falls for him.

As Štefan's car breaks down on the way to the elaborate wedding party and the cake adorned with a doll he is bringing begins to melt in the heat, Paulína, in her wedding dress and tipsy before the ceremony, suffers miscarriage, perhaps as a result of Johanka's earlier attempt to induce abortion that would look as if it occurred spontaneously. The car that carries Paulína to the hospital passes Štefan's car towed by a farm tractor, but none of the involved notice.

== Director ==
Štefan Uher (1930, Prievidza − 1993, Bratislava) graduated from the FAMU (Film and TV School of the Academy of Performing Arts) in Prague in 1955. Among his fellow students were future directors Martin Hollý Jr. and Peter Solan who also began to work at the Koliba film studios (then called the Feature Film Studio and the Short Film Studio) in Bratislava after graduation. Uher first worked in the short film division. His second feature film, The Sun in a Net is still recognized as a milestone in the development of Slovak and Czech cinema. Milka Zimková acted in his three previous films. The cameraman of She Grazed Horses on Concrete, Stanislav Szomolányi, later professor of cinematography at the University of Performing Arts, Bratislava, made nine other films with Uher.

== Screenplay ==
Milka Zimková's (b. 1951, Okružná) collection of short stories She Grazed Horses on Concrete (Pásla kone na betóne, 1980) was an instant success and has been republished least six times through the 2000s. Documentary film director Fero Fenič wrote a literary-narrative screenplay on themes from the last of the fifteen stories, "A Ticket to Heaven" (Vstupenka do neba), but when he began to work with Zimková on a shooting script, she disagreed with his bleak take on the story and the demotion of Johanka's character to a supporting role and refused him as the film's potential director. Fenič stuck to his approach and directed his reworked screenplay under the title A Juice Novel (Džusový román, 1984, released 1988) at the Barrandov Studios.

Zimková then found an accommodating co-writer in Uher who knew her from her roles in his three previous films. Their screenplay absorbed several of the themes and characters from her debut in fiction, but apart from that, there is little resemblance between the book's self-contained tales and the film's integrated storyline. Zimková said that the title was a phrase used in her village to describe someone who had happiness within reach and then lost it. That local meaning would not have been recognized by most viewers, though. It is a line from a waggish folk song. It continues "she bathed in razor blades..." and depicts a woman acting out impracticable feats. Zimková was key in the film's outcome: she was the author of the original book, co-wrote the screenplay, was familiar with the region where the story took place, and took on the leading role of Johanka.

== Cast ==
Actor	Role
Milka Zimková (1951–2023)	Johana "Johanka" Ovšená
Veronika Jeníková (b. 1964)	Pavlína "Pavla/Pavlínka" Ovšená, her daughter
Peter Staník (1947–1995)	Berty, Johanka's neighbor, friend and suitor
Marie Logojdová (b. 1952)	Jozefka, Johanka's friend
Valérie Jergová	Teča, Paulína's friend
Ľubomír Paulovič (1952–2024)	Štefan, Johanka's bridegroom
Jiří Klepl	Teacher Jarek
Ivan Klečka	Soldier Jirka, Paulína's lover
Anton Načiniak	Ján "Janko/Janči" Kerekeš, co-op director
Tamara Simková	Margita "Gitka" Kerekešová, his wife
Anton Trón (1926–1996)	Štefan "Pišta" Kovaľanec, shy amateur actor
Peter Vonš	Well-digger, Johanka's lover and Paulína's probable father
Jaroslav Sypal (b. 1958)	Tomáš Jakabuch, student from Forestry High School
Mikuláš Laš	Michal Ovšený, Johanka's brother
Ján Németh	Imriško, manager and violitnist of the wedding music band
Mária Godálová (1927–1983)	Štefan's Mother
Ferdinand Macurák	Ondro
Nora Kuželová	Katarína
Karel Riegel	Franta
Ján Mildner	Uncle Mihál, speaks up for Johanka at co-op meeting
Alena Fabiánová	Widow Holcová
Jozer Friňák	Jožko, talks out of order at co-op meeting
Želmíra Kačková	Neighbor
Beňo Michalský (b. 1927)	Driver
Andrej Šilan	District Agricultural Supervisor
Oľga Vronská (1920–2002)	Mother Felimáková
Jaroslav Trón	Doďo Felimák
Peter Benda	Dodo Dyha
Marián Geišberg	Feri Dyha

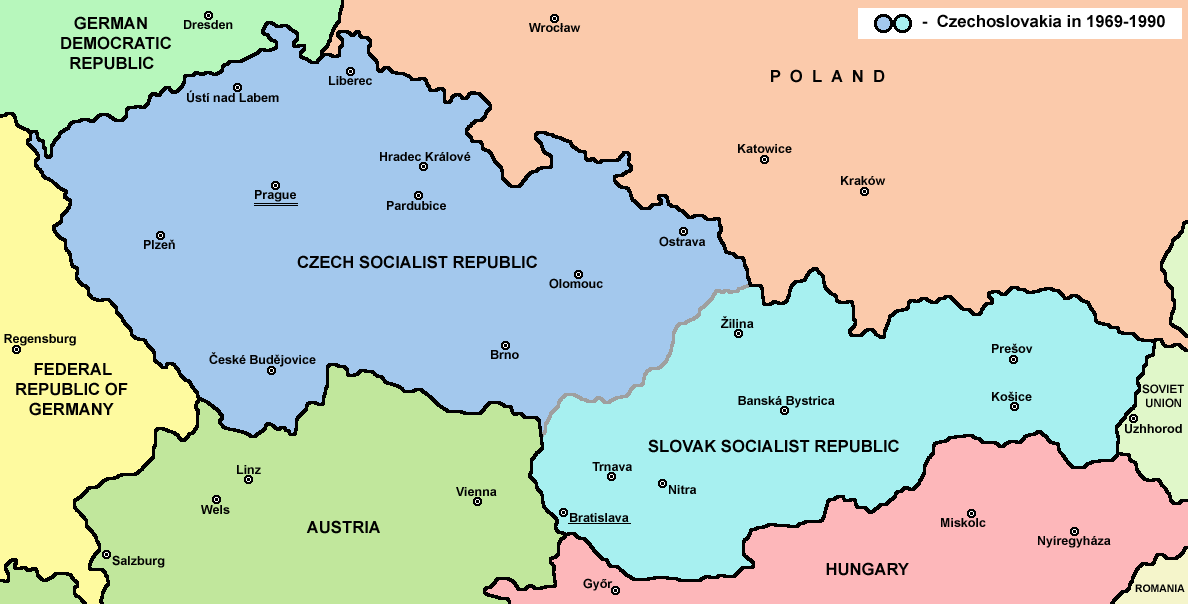
Czechoslovakia 1945-1992

Milka Zimková played in Štefan Uher's three previous films. The cast was composed of little known actors, several of them Czechs who were capable of giving convincing performances in Slovak as well as in its eastern regional variety, but the successful use of the local dialect also gave the distributors in the Czech-speaking area of Czechoslovakia the idea to have it subtitled in Czech, a complete rarity in the history of Czechoslovak cinema. Many of the extras were hired at Šarišské Michaľany and Fintice, two of the filming locations, as well as in neighboring Ostrovany.

== Release dates ==
The premiere was in Bratislava in 1982. The film opened in Czechoslovakia's Czech-speaking region in 1983. It was released in the now-defunct East Germany in 1984 under the literal translation Sie weidete Pferde auf Beton, which was also the case with its Polish title, Pasła konie na betonie, while the Hungarian rendition of the title was Betonlegelő (A Concrete Pasture), the latter two countries in 1985.

She Grazed Horses on Concrete was released on DVD in the PAL format, 4:3 aspect ratio, region-free ("Region 0") with English subtitles by SME/Slovenský filmový ústav in 2006.
