= Camila Loboguerrero =

Colombian film director, screenwriter and editor (1941–2025)

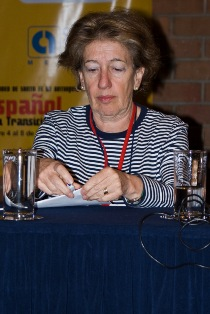
- Loboguerrero in 2009
- Born: Camila Loboguerrero; September 3, 1941; Bogotá, Colombia
- Died: June 21, 2025 (aged 83); Bogotá, Colombia
- Education: Universidad de los Andes; University of Vincennes
- Occupations: Film director; Screenwriter; Film editor
- Years active: 1971–2025
- Notable work: Los niños invisibles (Director and producer)

Camila Loboguerrero (September 3, 1941 – June 21, 2025) was a Colombian film director, screenwriter and editor who was regarded as the first woman in Colombia to venture into cinema as a director of feature films.

== Life and career ==
Loboguerrero was born in Bogotá on September 3, 1941, and began her studies of fine arts at the Universidad de los Andes. She later traveled to Paris where she would study art history at the Sorbonne, there she would meet personalities of the cinema of that country interested in cinematography which led her to pursue a degree in cinematography at the University of Vincennes.

In 1971, Loboguerrero returned to Colombia and made her first fiction feature film, Con su música a otra parte in 1984, with the support of the now defunct state entity FOCINE. In 1990, she made her second feature film, María Cano. During the 1990s, Loboguerrero created a variety of documentaries, short films and medium-length films that have been awarded at different festivals. In 2001, she served as art director and producer of the film Los niños invisibles by Lisandro Duque.

After a long absence from directing feature films, due in part to the lack of support for filmmakers after the closure of FOCINE, Loboguerrero resumed this activity thanks to the film law approved in 2003 and shot the feature film Christmas Eve with the support of the film fund. The film was released in December 2008.

Loboguerrero died on June 21, 2025, at the age of 83.
