= Bless You (disambiguation) =

Bless you is a common English expression.

Bless You may also refer to:

== Songs ==
- "Bless You" (Tony Orlando song), 1961
- "Bless You" (Martha and the Vandellas song), 1971
- "Bless You" (John Lennon song), by John Lennon from Walls and Bridges, 1974
- "Bless You (Save You, Spare You, Damn You)", by The Stranglers from Suite XVI, 2006
- "Bless You for Being an Angel", The Ink Spots, 1939

== Other uses ==
- Bless You, Prison, a 2002 Romanian drama film
- God Bless You (film), 1948 Argentine film
