= Koncert =

Koncert may refer to:

- Kohuept, Billy Joel album
- Koncert, live performance album of DG 307 (band)
- Koncert (1954 film), a Yugoslav film
- Koncert (1962 film), a Hungarian film by István Szabó
- Koncert (1982 Polish film), a Polish film
- Koncert (1982 Czech film), a Czech film by Jan Schmidt

== See also ==
- Concert
