= The Sun in a Net =

- Directed by: Štefan Uher
- Written by: Short stories: Alfonz Bednár; Screenplay: Alfonz Bednár
- Starring: Marián Bielik; Jana Beláková; Eliška Nosáľová; Ľubo Roman
- Cinematography: Stanislav Szomolányi
- Edited by: Bedřich Voděrka
- Music by: Ilja Zeljenka
- Release date: 15 February 1963
- Running time: 90 min
- Country: Czechoslovakia
- Language: Slovak

The Sun in a Net (Slnko v sieti, also translated as Sunshine in a net or Catching the sun in a net) is a 1963 film that became a key film in the development of Slovak and Czechoslovak cinema from the mandated Socialist-Realist filmmaking of the repressive 1950s towards the Czechoslovak/Czech New Wave and socially critical or experimental films of the 1960s marked by a gradual relaxation of communist control. The Sun in a Net received multiple votes in a wide survey of Czech and Slovak film academics and critics in the late 1990s asking them for their lists of the 10 best films in the history of filmmaking in the former Czechoslovakia.

== Plot ==
Oldrich "Fajolo" Fajták (Marián Bielik), a student who directs quasi-existentialist verbal abuse at his girlfriend Bela Blažejová (Jana Beláková), takes off to a formally volunteer summer work camp at a farm, actually mandated by the authorities, which inspires both him and Bela to start a relationship with someone else. A parallel story peels layers off Bela's permanently tense home life marked by her blind mother's (Eliška Nosáľová) studied helplessness, and her father's (Andrej Vandlík) revealed infidelity and past break with his father (Adam Jančo) who happens to live in the village where Fajolo is finding some consolation in the arms of a fellow student-volunteer Jana (Oľga Šalagová). As Fajolo begins to pry into Bela's grandfather's secrets, she, in turn, allows her new boyfriend Peťo (Ľubo Roman) to read and deride Fajolo's discursive and indirectly remorseful letters from the farm.

The solar eclipse barely discerned by the main characters through thick clouds at the beginning of the film is echoed by summer and fall images of the sun as they present themselves to all of them at various points in the film through a fisherman's net from his pontoon on the Danube beyond the city's suburbs, which Fajolo and Peťo have discovered independently and use as a swimming deck, a place to ponder life, or to try to seduce Bela. When, however, Bela brings her mother and brother Milo (Peter Lobotka) to the pontoon after a series of subdued interpersonal crises, the pontoon is on dry land because the water level has dropped, and the film ends with Bela and Milo lying to their mother about what they can see as they did about the visibility of the eclipse during the opening sequences.

== Cast ==
- Marián Bielik as Oldrich "Fajolo" Fajták
- Michal Dočolomanský (born 1942) as Oldrich "Fajolo" Fajták (voice)
- Jana Beláková as Bela Blažejová
- Eliška Nosáľová as Mother, Stanislava "Stanka" Blažejová
- Andrej Vandlík (1925-1985) as Father, Ján "Jano" Blažej
- Peter Lobotka as Son/Brother Milo Blažej
- Adam Jančo as Farm Stacker Blažej, father/grandfather
- Pavol Chrobák as Supervisor Mechanic Blažej
- Viliam Polónyi (born 1928) as Supervisor Mechanic Blažej (voice)
- Ľubo Roman (born 1944) as Peťo
- Oľga Šalagová as Jana

Uher chose little known actors (Eliška Nosáľová and Andrej Vandlík, both from the SNP Theater in Martin) or non-actors, two of whom had to be dubbed – by Michal Dočolomanský, a student of acting and later a star of Slovak cinema, and by Viliam Polónyi, a professional actor. Only Ľubo Roman, a student of acting at that time, became a successful actor, theater administrator, and ultimately a politician. Jana Beláková from a singer's family had marginal experience from several TV productions and followed her role in The Sun in a Net with a singing career.

== Director ==
Štefan Uher (1930, Prievidza − 1993, Bratislava) graduated from the FAMU (Film and TV School of the Academy of Performing Arts) in Prague in 1955. Among his fellow students were future directors Martin Hollý Jr. and Peter Solan who also began to work at the Koliba film studios (then called the Feature Film Studio and the Short Film Studio) in Bratislava after graduation. Uher first worked in the short film division. The Sun in a Net was his second feature film. His first one was We from Study Group 9-A (My z deviatej A, 1962) about the life of a group of 15-year-old students and their school. Uher followed The Sun in a Net by two more films with the same author-screenwriter Alfonz Bednár and cameraman − Stanislav Szomolányi, later professor of cinematography at the University of Performing Arts, Bratislava: The Organ (Organ, 1964), and Three Daughters (Tri dcéry, 1967). The original music score in The Sun in a Net is by the composer Ilja Zeljenka, who also worked with Uher on We from Study Group 9-A, and went on to work with him on six more films. Uher's and Szomolányi's She Grazed Horses on Concrete (Pásla kone na betóne, 1982) has remained one of Slovakia's most popular domestic productions through the 2000s.

== Screenplay ==
The screenwriter, Alfonz Bednár (1914, Neporadza − 1989, Bratislava), was already an established writer who published mildly nonconformist fiction somewhat earlier than most other authors. He studied Latin, Slovak, and Czech at universities in Prague and Bratislava. He was also familiar with American and British fiction and had translated Ernest Hemingway, Jack London, Howard Fast, and other authors.

Bednár joined the Koliba film studios, Bratislava, in 1960. His first screenplay was The Sun in a Net. He based it on his three short stories "Fajolo’s Contribution" (Fajolov príspevok), "Pontoon Day" (Pontónový deň), and "Golden Gate" (Zlatá brána). A highly likely source of the central theme was the 95% solar eclipse that occurred in Central Europe on February 15, 1961. Additional inspiration for the symbolic construction of the storyline may have come from ancient solar myths that have been available in Europe in increasingly numerous publications since at least 1865. A specific myth of the Sun in a net was brought from Polynesia, more general myths of catching the Sun have been attributed to the pre-Columbian Americas, some of the published solar myths may date back to Indo-European prehistory. Associations with Sol Invictus and other solar myths are possible.

== Significance ==
The early 1960s saw some relaxation of communism in Czechoslovakia. The Sun in a Net was the first film that took advantage of this new atmosphere. It brought a number of hitherto unacceptable social and political themes: distant — perhaps uncaring — parents, a philandering husband, teenagers changing partners, an attempt at suicide, a poorly run collectivized farm, the fact that the students disdained the summer "voluntary" work camps. None of these issues are resolved in a "positive" manner. The core storyline — the ups and downs in the relationship of two teenagers — the realism and novelty of its urban setting, and the hints at some social and political taboos were not lost on the audience, and cannot have been lost on the censors. The Sun in a Net pushed the envelope and showed artists, and the audience at large, what the authorities could now be pressed to permit.

Besides Štefan Uher’s effort to get past the strict requirements of Socialist Realism, the director was inspired by some of the trends current in (Western) European cinema and culture in the 1950s. Among them were traces of Italian neorealism, the film's low-key style, a hint of fashionable existentialism in the dialogues, and attempts at cinéma-vérité amplified in the beer-drinking scenes in a tavern by the employment of a background soundtrack with taped unscripted conversations of real villagers. That also motivated Uher's choice of unconversant actors or non-actors. Some of the film's traits inspired students at the FAMU, who soon followed with a series of films known as the Czechoslovak/Czech New Wave.
