= Return from Hell =

1983 film

- Directed by: Nicolae Mărgineanu
- Written by: Nicolae Mărgineanu; Petre Sălcudeanu; Ion Agârbiceanu (novella)
- Produced by: Grid Modorcea
- Starring: Constantin Brînzea; Maria Ploae
- Cinematography: Vlad Păunescu
- Edited by: Cristina Ionescu
- Music by: Cornel Țăranu
- Production company: Casa de Filme 3
- Distributed by: Româniafilm
- Release date: July 1983
- Running time: 90 minutes
- Country: Romania
- Language: Romanian

Return from Hell (Romanian: Întoarcerea din iad) is a 1983 Romanian drama film directed by Nicolae Mărgineanu. It was entered into the 13th Moscow International Film Festival where it won a Special Diploma. The film was also selected as the Romanian entry for the Best Foreign Language Film at the 56th Academy Awards, but was not accepted as a nominee.

== Cast ==
- Constantin Brînzea (as Constantin Branzea) – Dumitru Bogdan
- Maria Ploae – Veronica
- Remus Mărgineanu – Ion Roșu
- Ana Ciontea – Catarina
- Ion Săsăran – Grigor Albu
- Vasile Nițulescu – Ilie Rău
- Lucia Mara
- Liliana Țicău
- Livia Baba
- Olimpia Arghir
- Valentin Uritescu – Vasile Lișniță

== See also ==
- List of submissions to the 56th Academy Awards for Best Foreign Language Film
- List of Romanian submissions for the Academy Award for Best Foreign Language Film
