= The Famous Paparazzo =

- Directed by: Nicolae Mărgineanu
- Written by: Rasvan Popescu
- Produced by: Nicolae Mărgineanu
- Starring: Marcel Iureș
- Cinematography: Doru Mitran
- Release date: 9 November 1999
- Running time: 90 minutes
- Country: Romania
- Language: Romanian

The Famous Paparazzo (Romanian: Faimosul paparazzo) is a 1999 Romanian drama film directed by Nicolae Mărgineanu. It was Romania's official Best Foreign Language Film submission at the 72nd Academy Awards, but did not manage to receive a nomination. It was also entered into the 22nd Moscow International Film Festival.

== Cast ==
- Marcel Iureș as Gari
- Maria Ploae as Miss
- Gheorghe Dinică as Procurorul
- Valeriu Popescu as Politicianul
- Draga Olteanu-Matei as Vecina de mansardă
- Alexandru Repan as Director de ziar
- Victoria Cociaș
- Gheorghe Visu
- Mădălina Constantin
- Vlad Ivanov
- George Alexandru
- Adriana Trandafir
- Valentin Teodosiu
- Adriana Șchiopu
- Monica Ghiuță
- Tudor Manole
- Armand Calotă
- Ion Pavlescu
- Miruna Birău
- Vlad Ivanov
- George Ivașcu
- Dan Chișu
- Cerasela Iosifescu
- Șerban Pavlu
- Viorel Păunescu
- Adrian Dumitru
- Radu Stoenescu
- Constantin Bărbulescu
- Dragoș Pârvulescu
- Liviu Timuș
- Florin Anton
