= Dămăroaia =

District of Bucharest, Romania

Coordinates: 44.491592°N 26.053391°E

- Neighborhood
- Interactive map of Dămăroaia
- Country: Romania
- Municipality: Bucharest
- Sector: Sector 1

Area
  - Total: 10 km^{2} (3.9 sq mi)
- Time zone: UTC+2 (EET)
  - Summer (DST): UTC+3 (EEST)

Dămăroaia is a district in the north side of Bucharest, Romania in Sector 1. It covers about 10 km^{2} (3.9 sq mi), making it one of the largest neighborhoods of Sector 1. RATB bus 331 and tram 24 serve the area.

Prior to 1918, when it was purchased by the government, the area belonged to the Stoicescu family. The land began to be sold off in 1926, and starting in 1931, a large number of Căile Ferate Române employees moved there. In 1939, it was incorporated into Grivița Commune, which became part of Bucharest in 1950.

A chapel was built in 1931, and a school was begun the following year. The Dămăroaia Church dates to 1946. Soviet-style apartment blocks were built on unoccupied land in the late 1950s. A further round of block construction came about in the late 1960s.
