= Bless You, Prison =

- Directed by: Nicolae Mărgineanu
- Starring: Maria Ploae; Dorina Lazar
- Release date: 8 November 2002
- Running time: 1h 30min
- Country: Romania
- Language: Romanian

Bless You, Prison (Romanian: Binecuvântată fii, închisoare) is a 2002 Romanian drama film based on the eponymous novel by Nicole Valéry Grossu.

== Cast ==
- Maria Ploae - Nicoleta
- Dorina Lazăr - Prison Director
- Ecaterina Nazare - Prisoner
- Maria Rotaru - Prisoner
