= Wirgiliusz Gryń =

Polish actor (1928–1986)

- Born: 9 June 1928; Dąbrowa Górnicza, Poland
- Died: 3 September 1986 (aged 58); Warsaw, Poland
- Occupation: Actor
- Years active: 1964–1986

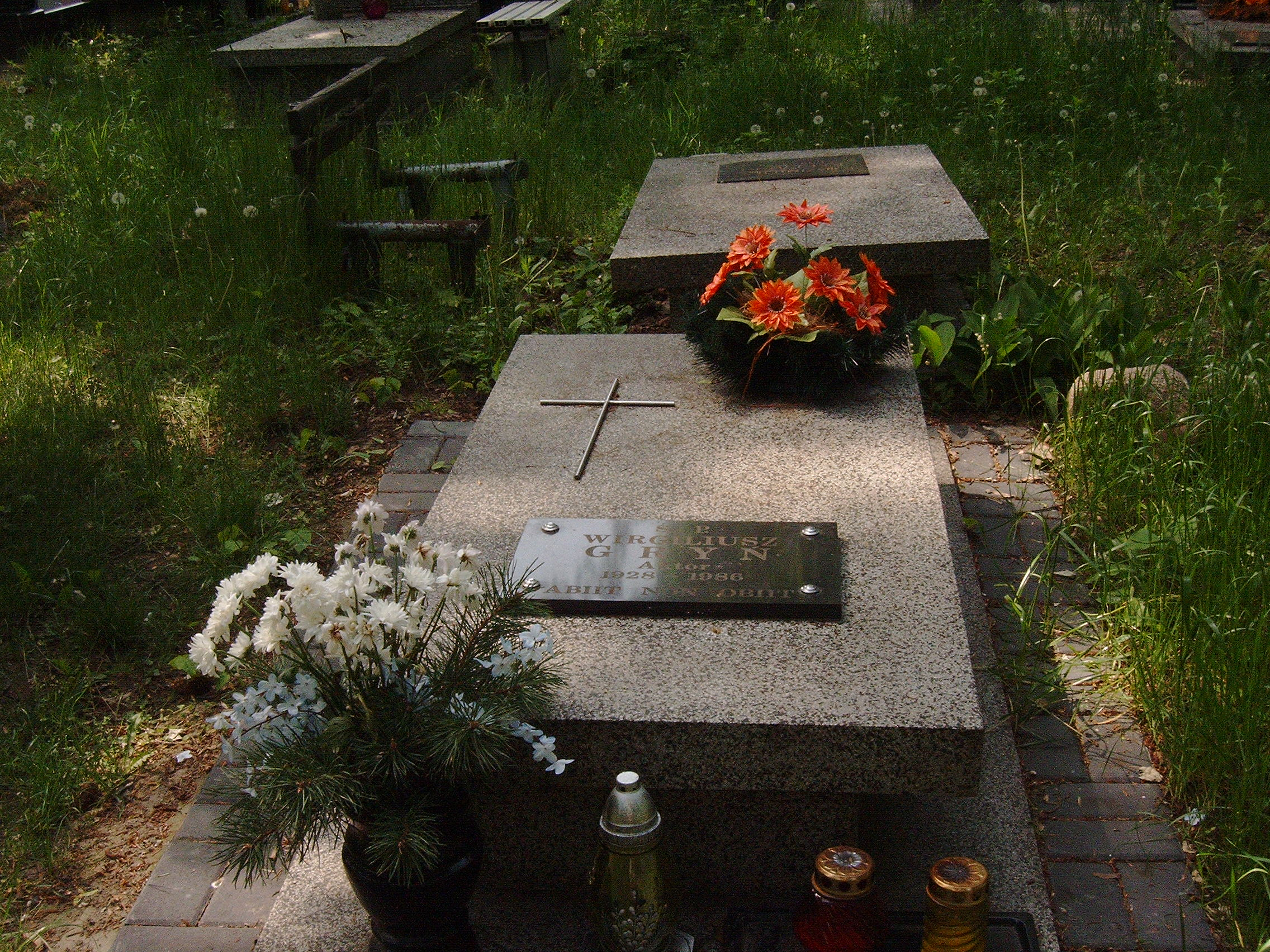
Grave of Wirgiliusz Gryń at the Doły Cemetery in Łódź

Wirgiliusz Gryń (9 June 1928 – 3 September 1986) was a Polish actor. He appeared in more than 60 films and television shows between 1964 and 1986. At the 13th Moscow International Film Festival he won the award for Best Actor for his role in Pastorale heroica.

== Selected filmography ==
- Matthew's Days (1968)
- How I Unleashed World War II (1969)
- Pastorale heroica (1983)
