= Dămăroaia Church =

Orthodox church in Bucharest, Romania

Coordinates: 44°29′19″N 26°03′12″E

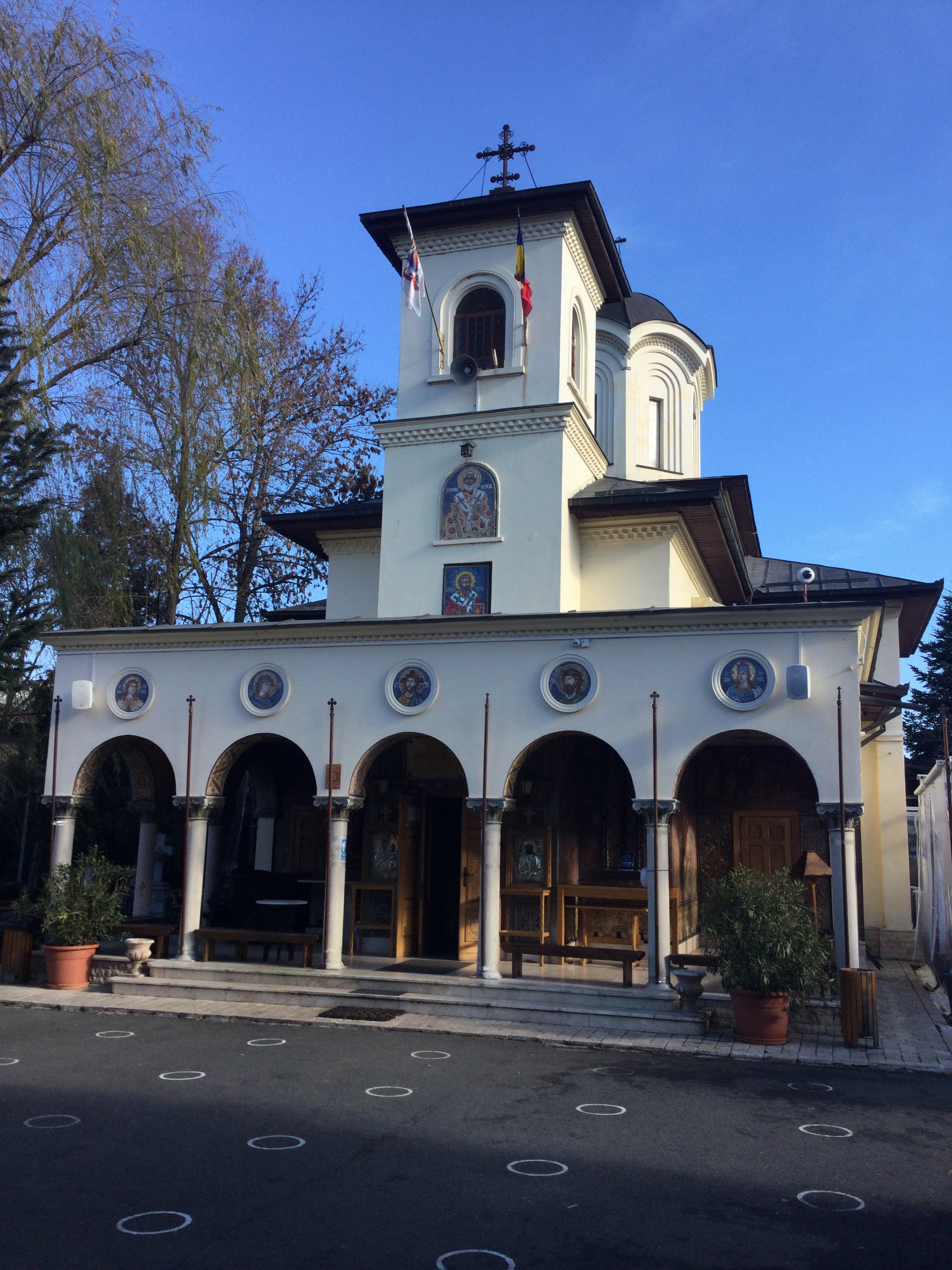
Dămăroaia Church

The Dămăroaia Church (Romanian: Biserica Dămăroaia) is a Romanian Orthodox church located at 1 Victor Daimaca Street in the Dămăroaia quarter of Bucharest, Romania. It is dedicated to Saint Nicholas and to Saint Myron of Cyzicus.

== History ==
The church was built in 1946 on the site of a former chapel from 1931. Preparations for construction lasted some time, involving fundraising and commitment from parishioners and the priest, who in 1938 selected a site in the embryonic neighborhood, planting decorative and fruit trees. The effort was supported by Conducător Ion Antonescu and his wife Maria, who contributed 1 million lei, one-sixth of the total cost. It is one of few Romanian churches built during the transition toward the communist regime.

By 1946, under the difficult conditions of World War II and its aftermath, funds and materials had been collected. The cornerstone was laid in August, following the plans of Dimitrie Ionescu-Berechet, and the new church was blessed on Christmas day. The portico was built the following year. The interior frescoes, painted with the support of Patriarch Justinian Marina, date to 1953–1954. The painted masonry iconostasis dates to 1958–1960. The church was again dedicated in 1963.

== Description ==
The church has elements of Byzantine Revival architecture (the shape, the dome motifs, the spacious portico) but also of Romanian Revival architecture (the position of the bell tower, the profiled pediments, the emphasis on the entrance door). It is one of few buildings in the latter style made for communities of modest means.

Made of brick and reinforced concrete, the church is shaped like a Greek cross, 22 meters long by 14 meters wide. Four main columns support the two vaulted ceilings, north–south and east–west. The octagonal dome sits atop their intersection. The square bell tower sits atop the narthex and small vestibule. The portico features five frontal arches and three on each side, with cylindrical columns and flowered capitals. The facades are simple, with one pediment below each dome. The bell tower base has a rectangular area for icons of the patron saints. The churchyard contains the parish house (1956-1958) and a chapel (1995).

The church is listed as a historic monument by Romania's Ministry of Culture and Religious Affairs.
