= Balance (1983 film) =

1983 film

- Directed by: Lyudmil Kirkov
- Written by: Stanislav Stratiev
- Produced by: Yanko Mutafchiev
- Starring: Georgi Georgiev-Getz
- Cinematography: Dimko Minov
- Release dates: July 1983 (Moscow); 26 December 1983 (Bulgaria)
- Running time: 140 minutes
- Country: Bulgaria
- Language: Bulgarian

Balance (Bulgarian: Равновесие, translit. Ravnovesie) is a 1983 Bulgarian drama film directed by Lyudmil Kirkov. It was entered into the 13th Moscow International Film Festival where it won the Silver Prize.

== Cast ==
- Georgi Georgiev-Getz as the screenwriter
- Plamena Getova as Elena
- Konstantin Kotsev as the film director
- Katerina Evro as Maria
- Pavel Popandov as Milko
- Vania Tzvetkova as the actress Vania
- Stefan Danailov as the actor
- Nevena Simeonova as Elena's mother
- Luchezar Stoyanov as the cameraman
- Ivan Dzhambazov as the chief of the production
- Maria Stefanova as the screenwriter's wife
- Stefan Ilyev as the friend of the Maria's father
