= Pustynya =

Pustynya Пустыня
- Village
- Location within Arkhangelsk Oblast Location within Russia
- Coordinates: 64°30′N 48°29′E
- Country: Russia
- Region: Arkhangelsk Oblast
- District: Leshukonsky District
- Time zone: UTC+3:00

Pustynya (Russian: Пусты́ня) is a rural locality (a village) in Vozhgorskoye Rural Settlement of Leshukonsky District, Arkhangelsk Oblast, Russia. As of 2010, the population of Pustynya was 28.

== Geography ==
Pustynya is located 192 km southeast of Leshukonskoye (the district's administrative centre) by road. Zubovo is the nearest rural locality.
