= Maria Ploae =

Romanian actress

- Born: 19 February 1951 (age 75); Dealu Perjului, Bacău County, Romania
- Education: I.L. Caragiale Institute of Theatre and Film Arts
- Occupation: Actress
- Years active: 1973–present
- Spouse: Nicolae Mărgineanu
- Children: 3
- Awards: National Order of Merit

Maria Ploae (born 19 February 1951) is a Romanian actress. She appeared in more than twenty films since 1973.

Born in Dealu Perjului, Bacău County, she graduated in 1975 from the Caragiale National University of Theatre and Film, where she studied with Octavian Cotescu and Ovidiu Schumacher. In December 2002 she was awarded by Romanian President Ion Iliescu the National Order of Merit, Knight rank.

She is married to film director Nicolae Mărgineanu.

== Selected filmography ==
Year	Title	Role	Notes
1975	Toamna bobocilor	Mariella Tudor	
1976	Dincolo de pod	Persida	
1976	Pintea	Iza	
1978	Mînia	Raluca	
1980	La răscrucea marilor furtuni	Maria Rosetti	
1981	Ștefan Luchian	Cecilia Vasilescu	
1982	Așteptînd un tren	Matilda	
1983	Return from Hell	Veronica	
1986	Cuibul de viespi	Margareta Aldea	
1999	The Famous Paparazzo	Ioana Iuga	
1994	Eyes That Do Not See	Mara	
2002	Bless You, Prison	Nicoleta	
2006	Stealing Innocence	Angela	
2007	Logodnicii din America	Sanda	
2008	Mother Doctors	Letiția Zaharescu	
2010	The Princess and the Frog	Eudora (voice)	
2012	A Month in Thailand	Elena	
2018	Fals tratat de mântuire a sufletului		
2019	Cardinalul	Otilia	
