= Mikhail Kats =

American engineer and academic (born 1986)

- Born: 1986 (age 39–40); Saint Petersburg, Russia
- Education: Cornell University; Harvard University
- Known for: Optical metasurfaces, thin film optics, thermal radiation
- Awards: Presidential Early Career Award for Scientists and Engineers (PECASE)
- Scientific career
- Workplaces: University of Wisconsin–Madison
- Thesis: Optics at interfaces: Ultra-thin color coatings, perfect absorbers, and metasurfaces (2014)
- Doctoral advisor: Federico Capasso
- Website: katsgroup.ece.wisc.edu

Mikhail A. Kats (born 1986) is an American optics/photonics researcher and applied physicist. He is Jack St. Clair Kilby professor and Antoine-Bascom professor of electrical and computer engineering at the University of Wisconsin–Madison. During his studies at Harvard University as a graduate student, Kats developed new nanophotonic and plasmonic technologies.

== Early life and education ==
Kats was born in Saint Petersburg, Russia, but his family moved to Kansas when he was a child. Kats earned his Bachelor of Science degree in engineering physics in 2008 from Cornell University before enrolling at Harvard University for his graduate degrees. He had originally planned to study computer science at Cornell but was drawn to applied physics, particularly optics and photonics. Kats also pursued undergraduate research in Cornell's Semiconductor Optoelectronics Group led by Farhan Rana.

While completing his master's degree and PhD, Kats developed new nanophotonic and plasmonic technologies under the direction of Federico Capasso. Together with Nanfang Yu, Patrice Genevet, Zeno Gaburro, and several other members of Capasso's research group, Kats developed optical metasurfaces based on resonant plasmonic antennas that resulted in the generalization of the laws of reflection on refraction and the development of flat lenses with thickness of tens of nanometers. Kats and colleagues also demonstrated that absorbing films of the thickness of tens of atoms can display thin-film interference effects. In the same year, Kats also co-invented a device which reacts to temperature changes by reflecting dramatically more or less infrared light, making it well suited for use in a range of infrared optical devices.

== Career ==
After spending one year as a post-doctoral fellow at Harvard, Kats started a faculty position at the University of Wisconsin–Madison (UW–Madison). When reflecting upon his choice, Kats said he was drawn to the university because of its "high level of research in electrical engineering and physics, its ample supply of excellent students to aid him in his research and its wide range of research topics and interdisciplinary research opportunities." Initially, Kats continued the research he began at Harvard at UW–Madison and led an international team of researchers to develop a way to precisely engineer the temperatures at which vanadium dioxide would undergo its phase transition. In recognition of his accomplishments studying the development of nanoscopic optical devices, Forbes magazine listed him amongst their '30 under 30′ in 2016.

As an assistant professor of electrical and computer engineering, Kats received funding from the U.S. Office of Naval Research Young Investigator Program to "develop solutions to seemingly intractable modern problems." With this support, he began studying materials that can rapidly switch from transparent to opaque in order to develop optical diodes. Kats also co-designed multiband filters for eyeglasses to trick the eye into effectively having another type of cone cell in an effort to see more distinct colours. The following year, Kats received a CAREER award from the National Science Foundation for his efforts to tweak how substances emit light as they change temperatures. He was also named by Clarivate as a 2018 highly cited researcher and identified by the American Society for Engineering Education as a "highly promising investigator under the age of 40." In 2019, Kats received tenure from the university and earned the Vilas Faculty Early Career Investigator Award. In his research laboratory, Kats developed a solid object that for the first time decouples temperature and thermal light emission over a certain temperature range.

Kats was the recipient of the 2020 Institute of Electrical and Electronics Engineers (IEEE) Nanotechnology Council Early Career Award in Nanotechnology. He received the award for "his investigation of fundamental problems in optics and photonics with the aim of creating next-gen optical components that emit, modulate, and detect light across the visible and infrared spectrum." Alongside his research associate Yuzhe Xiao, Kats developed depth thermography, a technique to remotely determine the temperature beneath the surface of certain materials. He also co-founded the Photonics Online Meetup, a free online conference in optics and photonics. In 2025, Kats received the Presidential Early Career Award for Scientists and Engineers and was elected a Fellow of SPIE and of Optica. He also received the 2026 ACS Photonics Young Investigator Lectureship Award.
