= The Bicycle Racer =

1983 film

- Directed by: Lisandro Duque Naranjo
- Written by: Lisandro Duque Naranjo
- Starring: Gina Morett
- Cinematography: Jorge Pinto
- Release date: July 1983
- Running time: 90 minutes
- Country: Colombia
- Language: Spanish

The Bicycle Racer (Spanish: El escarabajo) is a 1983 Colombian drama film written and directed by Lisandro Duque Naranjo. It was entered into the 13th Moscow International Film Festival.

== Cast ==
- Gina Morett as Emma
- Eduardo Gazcón as Álvaro
- Argemiro Castiblanco as Humberto
- Carlos Parada as Never
- Marcelo Gaete as Murillo
- Omar Sánchez as Rogelio
- Fernando Ramírez as Policía
- José Patrocinio Jiménez as himself
