= The Invisible Children =

2001 film

- Directed by: Lisandro Duque Naranjo
- Written by: Lisandro Duque Naranjo
- Starring: Guillermo Castañeda
- Release date: 26 October 2001
- Running time: 90 minutes
- Country: Colombia
- Language: Spanish

The Invisible Children (Spanish: Los niños invisibles) is a 2001 Colombian drama film written and directed by Lisandro Duque Naranjo. It was selected as the Colombian entry for the Best Foreign Language Film at the 75th Academy Awards, but it was not nominated.

== Cast ==
- Guillermo Castañeda as Rafael
- Ingrid Cielo Ospina as Martha Cecilia
- Gustavo Angarita as Fernando

== See also ==
- List of submissions to the 75th Academy Awards for Best Foreign Language Film
- List of Colombian submissions for the Academy Award for Best Foreign Language Film
