= 13th Moscow International Film Festival =

Film festival

- Location: Moscow, Soviet Union
- Founded: 1959
- Awards: Grand Prix
- Festival date: 7–21 July 1983
- Website: http://www.moscowfilmfestival.ru

The 13th Moscow International Film Festival was held from 7 to 21 July 1983. The Golden Prizes were awarded to the Moroccan-Guinea-Senegalese film Amok directed by Souheil Ben-Barka, the Nicaraguan-Cuban-Mexican-Costa Rican film Alsino and the Condor directed by Miguel Littín and the Soviet film Vassa directed by Gleb Panfilov.

== Jury ==
- Stanislav Rostotsky (USSR – President of the Jury)
- Maya-Gozel Aimedova (USSR)
- Vladimir Baskakov USSR)
- Blanca Guerra (Mexico)
- Cesare Zavattini (Italy)
- Jacques Duqeau-Rupp (France)
- Stanisław Mikulski (Poland)
- Ulyses Petit de Murat (Argentina)
- Ion Popescu-Gopo (Romania)
- Dusan Roll (Czechoslovakia)
- Alimata Salambere (Upper Volta)
- Mrinal Sen (India)
- Georgi Stoyanov (Bulgaria)
- Pham Nguoc Truong (Vietnam)
- Theo Hinz (West Germany)

== Films in competition ==
The following films were selected for the main competition:

English title	Original title	Director(s)	Production country
Alsino and the Condor	Alcino y el condor	Miguel Littín	Nicaragua, Cuba, Mexico, Costa Rica
Amok	Amok	Souheil Ben-Barka	Morocco, Guinea, Senegal
The Homeless One	Matlosa	Villi Hermann	Switzerland
Clash of Loyalties	Al-mas' Ala Al-Kubra	Mohamed Shukri Jameel	Iraq, Great Britain
Back to the Sand Village	Ve noi gio cat	Hui Thanh	Vietnam
Vassa	Vassa	Gleb Panfilov	Soviet Union
The Bicycle Racer	El escarabajo	Lisandro Duque Naranjo	Colombia
Return from Hell	Întoarcerea din iad	Nicolae Mărgineanu	Romania
Pastorale heroica	Pastorale heroica	Henryk Bielski	Poland
Little Stones	Kieselsteine	Lukas Stepanik	Austria
Demons in the Garden	Demonios en el jardín	Manuel Gutiérrez Aragón	Spain
Doctor Faustus	Doktor Faustus	Franz Seitz	West Germany
Breathless	Ademloos	Mady Saks	Netherlands
The Smell of Quinces	Miris dunja	Mirza Idrizović	Yugoslavia
Zappa	Zappa	Bille August	Denmark
Winter of Our Dreams	Winter of our Dreams	John Duigan	Australia
Winter 1960	Hiver 60	Thierry Michel	Belgium
The Outsiders	The Outsiders	Francis Ford Coppola	United States
Jon	Jon	Jaakko Pyhälä	Finland
My Friend	Mi socio	Paolo Agazzi	Bolivia
Concrete Pastures	...pasla kone na betone	Štefan Uher	Czechoslovakia
Nelisita	Nelisita	Ruy Duarte de Carvalho	Angola
Night Rehearsal	Hatásvadászok	Miklós Szurdi	Hungary
Les Misérables	Les Misérables	Robert Hossein	France
Homecoming Song	To tragoudi tis epistrofis	Yannis Smaragdis	Greece
Five Fingers of One Hand	Five Fingers of One Hand	I. Hyamgavaa, B. Baljinniam	Mongolia
Balance	Ravnovesie	Lyudmil Kirkov	Bulgaria
Hometown	Furusato	Seijirō Kōyama	Japan
The Compass Rose	La rosa de los vientos	Patricio Guzmán	Cuba, Spain, Venezuela
The Deal	El arreglio	Fernando Ayala	Argentina
Seventh Man	Ezhavathu manithan	K. Hariharan	India
Sergeant Getulio	Sargento Getúlio	Hermanno Penna	Brazil
Guerilla from the North	El guerrillero del norte	Francisco Guerrero	Mexico
Harvesting of Steel	Moissons d'acier	Ghaouti Bendedouche	Algeria
The Tin Flute	Bonheur d'occasion	Claude Fournier	Canada
Shadow of the Earth	Dhil al ardh	Taieb Louhichi	Tunisia, France
Sunset Street	Xizhao jie	Wang Haowei	China
The Street Player	El harrif	Mohamed Khan	Egypt
Frances	Frances	Graeme Clifford	United States, Great Britain
The Painter	Målaren	Göran du Rées	Sweden
Zille and Me	Zille und ick	Werner W. Wallroth	East Germany
I Know That You Know That I Know	Io so che tu sai che io so	Alberto Sordi	Italy

== Awards ==
- Golden Prizes:
  - Amok by Souheil Ben-Barka
  - Alsino and the Condor by Miguel Littín
  - Vassa by Gleb Panfilov
- Special Prizes – For the contribution to cinema:
  - Alberto Sordi for I Know That You Know That I Know
  - Robert Hossein for Les Misérables
- Silver Prizes:
  - Balance by Lyudmil Kirkov
  - Doctor Faustus by Franz Seitz
  - Concrete Pastures by Štefan Uher
- Prizes:
  - Best Actor: Wirgiliusz Gryń for Pastorale heroica
  - Best Actor: Yoshi Katō for Hometown
  - Best Actress: Judy Davis for Winter of Our Dreams
  - Best Actress: Jessica Lange for Frances
  - Shadow of the Earth by Taieb Louhichi
- Special Diplomas:
  - The Deal by Fernando Ayala
  - Five Fingers of One Hand by I. Hyamgavaa, B. Baljinniam
  - Return from Hell by Nicolae Mărgineanu
- Prix FIPRESCI:
  - Demons in the Garden by Manuel Gutiérrez Aragón
  - Without Witness by Nikita Mikhalkov
