= Fintice =

Village and municipality in Slovakia

- Municipality
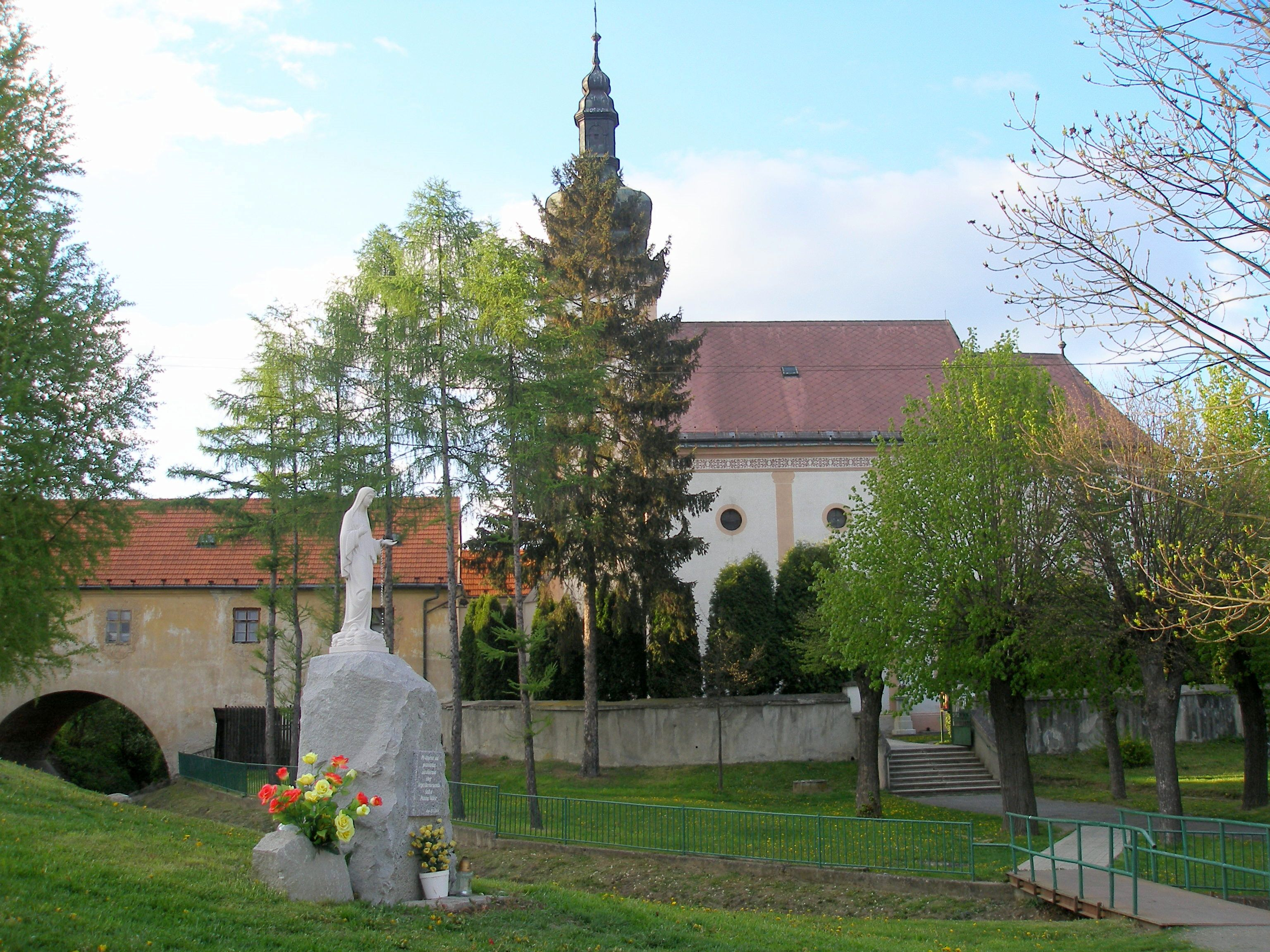

- Flag

- Location of Fintice in the Prešov Region Location of Fintice in Slovakia
- Coordinates: 49.05°N 21.30°E
- Country: Slovakia
- Region: Prešov Region
- District: Prešov District
- First mentioned: 1272

Area
  - Total: 11.24 km^{2} (4.34 sq mi)
- Elevation: 271 m (889 ft)

Population (2025)
  - Total: 2,687
- Time zone: UTC+1 (CET)
  - Summer (DST): UTC+2 (CEST)
- Postal code: 821 6
- Area code: +421 51
- Vehicle registration plate (until 2022): PO
- Website: www.fintice.sk

Fintice (Hungarian: Finta) is a village and municipality in Prešov District in the Prešov Region of eastern Slovakia.

== History ==
In historical records the village was first mentioned in 1272.

== Geography ==
The municipality lies at an altitude of 271 metres (889 ft) and covers an area of 11.24 km^{2} (4.34 sq mi) (2025).

== Population ==
Population statistic (10 years)
Year	1995	2005	2015	2025
Count	1480	1690	1970	2687
Difference		+14.18%	+16.56%	+36.39%

Population statistic
Year	2024	2025
Count	2550	2687
Difference		+5.37%

=== Ethnicity ===
Census 2021 (1+ %)
Ethnicity	Number	Fraction
Slovak	2137	98.61%
Rusyn	38	1.75%
Total	2167	

In year 2021 was 2167 people by ethnicity 2137 as Slovak, 38 as Rusyn, 16 as Czech, 8 as Not found out, 4 as Other, 3 as Ukrainian, 1 as Romani, 1 as Russian, 1 as Hungarian and 1 as English.

Note on population: The difference values of population numbers in the table "Population statistic" and in the sections "Ethnicity" & "Religion" is caused by the use of various statistical methods.

=== Religion ===
Census 2021 (1+ %)
Religion	Number	Fraction
Roman Catholic Church	1807	83.39%
None	173	7.98%
Greek Catholic Church	118	5.45%
Evangelical Church	26	1.2%
Total	2167	

In year 2021 was 2167 people by religion 1807 from Roman Catholic Church, 173 from None, 118 from Greek Catholic Church, 26 from Evangelical Church, 14 from Eastern Orthodox Church, 7 from Not found out, 5 from Ad hoc movements, 4 from Church of the Brethren, 4 from Apostolic Church, 2 from Other and not ascertained christian church, 2 from Christian Congregations in Slovakia, 2 from Other, 1 from Jewish community, 1 from Hinduism and 1 from Buddhism.

== Industry ==
Mining
Place	Material	2016	2017	2018	2019	2020	2021
DP Fintice	andesite 2.49	197.68 kt	189.11 kt	199.16 kt	15.117 kt	192.08 kt	193 kt
DP Fintice	andesite 2.62	4.44 kt	56.285 kt	30.15 kt	181.23 kt	107 kt	68 kt
Sum		202.12 kt	245.395 kt	229.31 kt	196.347 kt	299.08 kt	261 kt

== Genealogical resources ==
The records for genealogical research are available at the state archive "Statny Archiv in Presov, Slovakia"

- Roman Catholic church records (births/marriages/deaths): 1809–1895 (parish B)
- Greek Catholic church records (births/marriages/deaths): 1818–1895 (parish B)
- Lutheran church records (births/marriages/deaths): 1704–1895 (parish B)

== See also ==
- List of municipalities and towns in Slovakia
