= Nicole Valéry Grossu =

Romanian Christian writer and activist

Nicole Valéry Grossu (born Nicoleta Valeria Bruteanu, 4 July 1919 – 14 December 1996) was a Romanian Christian writer, journalist, and anti-communist activist.

== Biography ==
=== Early years ===
Nicoleta Valeria Bruteanu was born on 4 July 1919 in Turnu Măgurele, Romania. She was a niece of Iuliu Maniu. A graduate of the Bucharest Conservatory, she joined the National Peasants' Party during World War II. Between 1945 and 1947, she served as editor of Dreptatea, the official newspaper of the National Peasants' Party.

=== Detention years ===
Following the installation of the Communist regime in Romania, the National Peasants' Party, along with most of the other political parties, was outlawed. On 24 August 1949 she was arrested by the Securitate. Although she was never formally charged with or sentenced for any crime, she spent four years in prison as a political detainee. She recounted her ordeal in an autobiographical novel, titled Prisoner arise, that was originally published in French. The book was eventually translated into several languages. The Romanian movie Bless you, prison, based on this novel and directed by Nicolae Mărgineanu, was released in 2002.

=== Marriage ===
In April 1957, she married the writer and Christian activist Sergiu Grossu. In 1959, her husband was arrested by the communist authorities for his activity in Oastea Domnului (English: The Army of the Lord), a spiritual renewal movement associated with the Romanian Orthodox Church. Subsequently, he was sentenced to 12 years in prison, but he was released after serving only three years, in 1962.

=== Exile ===
In 1969, Nicole and Sergiu Grossu were permitted to leave Romania. They eventually settled in Paris, France, after having been granted political asylum by the French Government. There, they founded the publishing house Catacombes and served as editors of a magazine with the same name; they also founded the association La Chaine, and hosted the show "Duh și Adevăr" (Spirit and Truth) on Radio Trans-Europa, dedicated to defending religious liberty in the countries behind the Iron Curtain.

=== Final years ===
At the end of 1995, Nicole Valéry Grossu was diagnosed with lymphoma, a type of blood cell cancer primarily affecting lymph nodes. She underwent aggressive chemotherapy treatment at the Foch Hospital in Paris. Despite all efforts to save her life, she died on 14 December 1996 in Paris. Granting her deathbed wish, her husband had her mortal remains returned to Bucharest. She was laid to rest alongside her parents in the Sfânta Vineri Cemetery.

== Literary works ==
- Bénie sois-tu, prison [Blessed be you, prison], Plon, Paris. This is the most popular of her works; it was initially published in French by the Plon Publishing House, and was later translated into several languages.
- Hegemonia violenței (Communism, totalitarism, atheism) [The Hegemony of Violence (Communism, Totalitarianism, Atheism], translated from French by Ileana Cantuniari, Editura "Duh și Adevăr", București, 2000, 275 pages, ISBN 973-98392-4-X
- Din toată inima [With all my heart], Editura "Duh și Adevăr", București, 2003, 140 pages ISBN 973-98392-7-4
