= The Organ (film) =

- Directed by: Štefan Uher
- Release date: January 1965
- Country: Czechoslovakia
- Language: Slovak

The Organ is a 1965 Slovak film by Štefan Uher made at Filmové Studio Bratislava. The cast features Frantisek Bubik, Alexandr Brezina, and Kamil Marek. The plot concerns a young Polish deserter and a conservative Slovak priest sheltering from fascists.
