= Henryk Bielski =

Polish film director (1935–2025)

- Born: 19 January 1935; Lwów, Poland (now Lviv, Ukraine)
- Died: 3 March 2025 (aged 90)
- Occupation: Film director
- Years active: 1961–1989

Henryk Bielski (19 January 1935 – 3 March 2025) was a Polish film director. His 1983 film Pastorale heroica was entered into the 13th Moscow International Film Festival. He died on 3 March 2025, at the age of 90.

== Selected filmography ==
- Pastorale heroica (1983)
