= Štefan Uher =

- Born: 4 July 1930; Prievidza, Czechoslovakia
- Died: 29 March 1993 (aged 62); Bratislava, Slovakia
- Occupations: Film director, screenwriter
- Years active: 1955-1989

Štefan Uher (4 July 1930 – 29 March 1993) was a Slovak film director, one of the members of the Czechoslovak New Wave.

== Life and work ==
He was born in Prievidza on 4 June 1930. He graduated from the FAMU in Prague in 1955. Among his fellow students were future directors Martin Hollý Jr. and Peter Solan. All three began to work at the Koliba film studios (then called the Feature Film Studio and the Short Film Studio) in Bratislava after graduation.

Uher first worked in the short film division. The first movie he directed was My z deviatej A about the life of a group of 15-year-old students and their school. His second feature was The Sun in a Net. His next two movies The Organ (1964), and Three Daughters (1967) were based on screenplay by Alfonz Bednár.

He worked with a composer Ilja Zeljenka on 8 of his movies.

Uher's last film She Grazed Horses on Concrete (1982) has remained one of Slovakia's most popular domestic productions through the 2000s. The film was entered into the 13th Moscow International Film Festival where it won the Silver Prize.

== Filmography ==
=== Feature films ===
- Cesta nad oblaky (1955)
- Bolo raz priatelstvo (1958)
- My z deviatej A (1961)
- The Sun in a Net (1962)
- Organ (1965)
- Panna zázračnica (1966) (Miraculous Virgin)
- Tri dcéry (1967) (Three Daughters)
- Génius (1970)
- Keby som mal pusku (1971) (If I Had a Gun)
- Dolina (1973)
- Javor a Juliana (1973)
- Veľká noc a veľky den (1974)
- Studené podnebie (1974, TV)
- Keby som mal dievča (1976) (If I Had a Girl)
- Zlaté časy (1978) (Great Times)
- Penelopa (1978)
- Kamarátky (1979)
- Moje kone vrané (1980, TV mini-series)
- Kosenie jastrabej luky (1981) (Mowing of Hawk Meadow)
- She Grazed Horses on Concrete (1982)
- Šiesta veta (1986)
- Správca skanzenu (1988)

=== Documentaries ===
- Učitelka (1955)
- Stredoeurópský pohár (1955)
- Ludia pod Vihorlatom (1956)
- Tú kráčajú tragédie (1957)
- Niekedy v novembri (1958)
- Lodníci bez mora (1958)
- Poznačení tmou (1959)
- Očami kamery (1959)
