= Pastorale heroica =

1983 Polish film

- Directed by: Henryk Bielski
- Written by: Jerzy Janicki
- Starring: Wirgiliusz Gryń
- Cinematography: Maciej Kijowski
- Release dates: July 1983 (Moscow); 16 January 1984 (Poland)
- Running time: 86 minutes
- Country: Poland
- Language: Polish

Pastorale heroica is a 1983 Polish war film directed by Henryk Bielski. It was entered into the 13th Moscow International Film Festival, where Wirgiliusz Gryń won the award for Best Actor.

== Cast ==
- Wirgiliusz Gryń
- Teresa Lipowska as Chudzina
