= Okružná =

Village and municipality in Slovakia

- Municipality
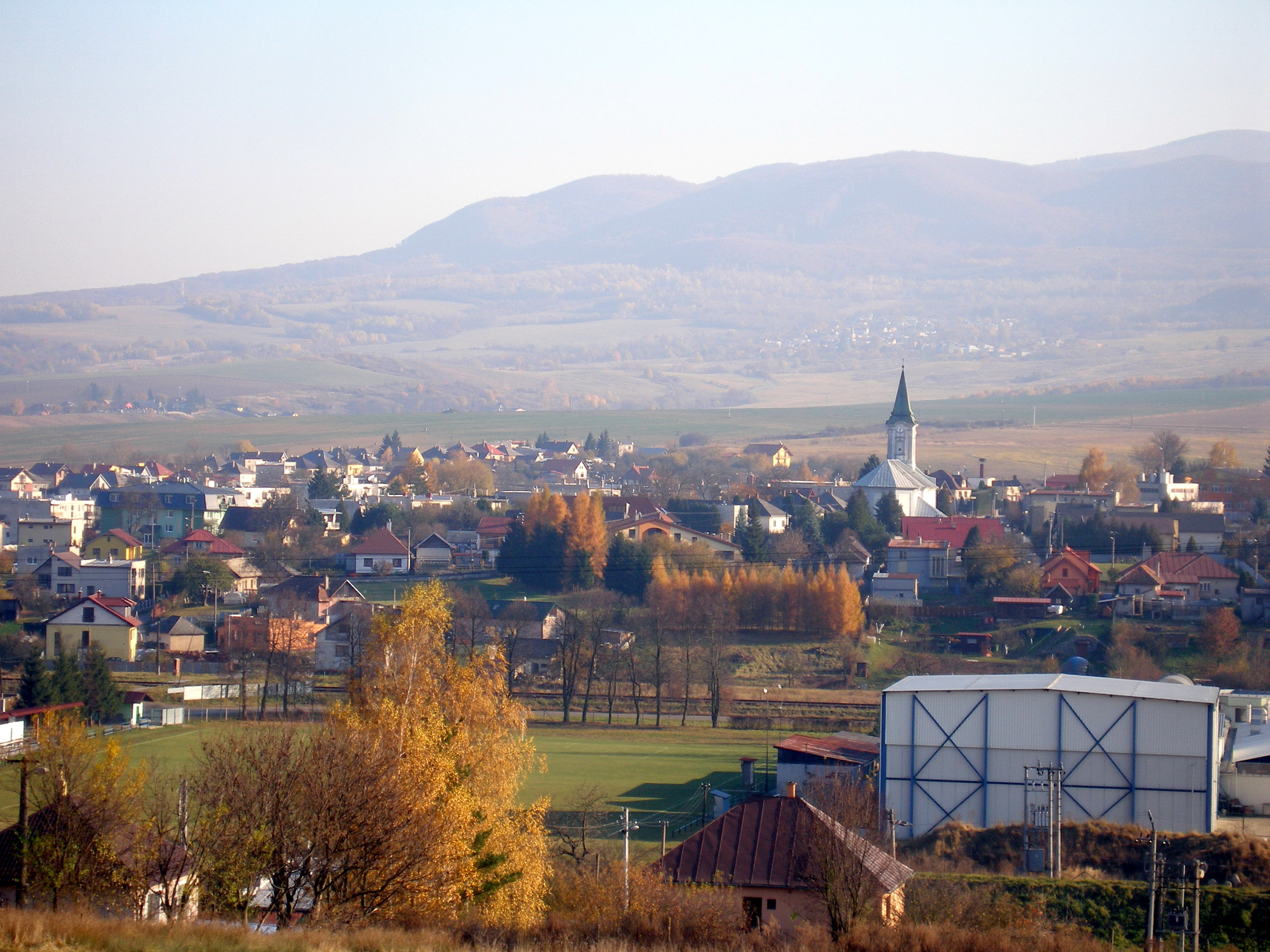

- Flag

- Location of Okružná in the Prešov Region Location of Okružná in Slovakia
- Coordinates: 49.03°N 21.38°E
- Country: Slovakia
- Region: Prešov Region
- District: Prešov District
- First mentioned: 1359

Area
  - Total: 11.51 km^{2} (4.44 sq mi)
- Elevation: 423 m (1,388 ft)

Population (2025)
  - Total: 555
- Time zone: UTC+1 (CET)
  - Summer (DST): UTC+2 (CEST)
- Postal code: 821 2
- Area code: +421 51
- Vehicle registration plate (until 2022): PO
- Website: www.obecokruzna.sk

Okružná (Hungarian: Kiskörösfő) is a village and municipality in Prešov District in the Prešov Region of eastern Slovakia.

== History ==
In historical records the village was first mentioned in 1359.

== Geography ==
The municipality lies at an altitude of 423 metres (1,388 ft) and covers an area of 11.51 km^{2} (4.44 sq mi) (2025).

== Population ==
Population statistic (10 years)
| Year | 1995 | 2005 | 2015 | 2025 |
|---|---|---|---|---|
| Count | 401 | 449 | 474 | 555 |
| Difference | | +11.97% | +5.56% | +17.08% |

Population statistic
| Year | 2024 | 2025 |
|---|---|---|
| Count | 541 | 555 |
| Difference | | +2.58% |

It has a population of 555 people (31 December 2025).

=== Ethnicity ===
Census 2021 (1+ %)
| Ethnicity | Number | Fraction |
|---|---|---|
| Slovak | 472 | 96.52% |
| Not found out | 15 | 3.06% |
| Rusyn | 7 | 1.43% |
| English | 5 | 1.02% |
| Total | 489 | |

In year 2021 was 489 people by ethnicity 472 as Slovak, 15 as Not found out, 7 as Rusyn, 5 as English, 1 as Czech, 1 as Romani and 1 as Hungarian.

Note on population: The difference values of population numbers in the table "Population statistic" and in the sections "Ethnicity" & "Religion" is caused by the use of various statistical methods.

=== Religion ===
Census 2021 (1+ %)
| Religion | Number | Fraction |
|---|---|---|
| Greek Catholic Church | 285 | 58.28% |
| Roman Catholic Church | 164 | 33.54% |
| None | 19 | 3.89% |
| Not found out | 10 | 2.04% |
| Evangelical Church | 6 | 1.23% |
| Total | 489 | |

In year 2021 was 489 people by religion 285 from Greek Catholic Church, 164 from Roman Catholic Church, 19 from None, 10 from Not found out, 6 from Evangelical Church, 2 from Other, 1 from Other and not ascertained christian church, 1 from United Methodist Church and 1 from Buddhism.
