= Ilja Zeljenka =

Slovak composer (1932–2007)

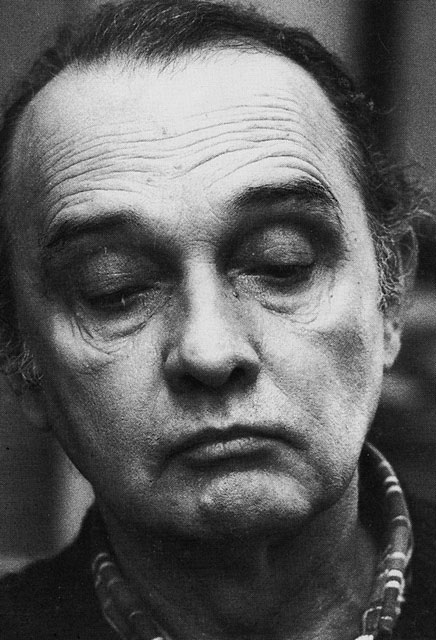
Ilja Zeljenka

Ilja Zeljenka (21 December 1932 – 13 July 2007) was a Slovak composer.

Born in Bratislava, Zeljenka studied music with Ján Cikker from 1951-1956. During the 1970s his more experimental idiom was suppressed by the Communist regime in Czechoslovakia, and he produced music based on folk music and neoromantic styles. His very large output includes three operas (including Bátoryčka (1994), based on the story of Elizabeth Báthory and Posledné dni Veľkej Moravy [The Last Days of Greater Moravia] (1996)), film music, piano works (including two pieces for piano and bongos), fourteen string quartets, nine symphonies, theatre music and electronic music. Among his vocal compositions is the cantata Oświęcim (1959), about the Auschwitz concentration camp.
