= Nicolae Mărgineanu (director) =

Romanian film director

- Born: 25 September 1938 (age 87); Cluj, Kingdom of Romania
- Education: I.L. Caragiale Institute of Theatre and Film Arts
- Occupations: Film director screenwriter
- Years active: 1978–present
- Spouse: Maria Ploae
- Children: 4
- Father: Nicolae Mărgineanu
- Website: margineanu.ro/artist/nicolae-d-margineanu/

Nicolae D. Mărgineanu (born 25 September 1938) is a Romanian film director and screenwriter. He has directed 15 films since 1978. His 1983 film Return from Hell was entered into the 13th Moscow International Film Festival where it won a Special Diploma. His 1999 film The Famous Paparazzo was entered into the 22nd Moscow International Film Festival.

He was born in Cluj, the son of moted psychologist Nicolae Mărgineanu. He graduated in 1969 from the I.L. Caragiale Institute of Theatre and Film Arts in Bucharest, and made his debut in 1978, co-directing Mai presus de orice with Dan Pița. He is married to actress Maria Ploae.

== Selected filmography ==
- Mai presus de orice (1978)
- Un om în loden (1979)
- Ștefan Luchian (1981)
- Return from Hell (1983)
- The Forest Woman (1987)
- Flames over Treasures (1988)
- Un bulgăre de humă (1990)
- Undeva, în Est (1991)
- Privește înainte cu mînie (1993)
- The Famous Paparazzo (1999)
- Bless You, Prison (2002)
- Logodnicii din America (2007)
- Schimb valutar (2008)
- White Gate (2014)
- The Cardinal (2019)
