= Lisandro Duque Naranjo =

Colombian film director

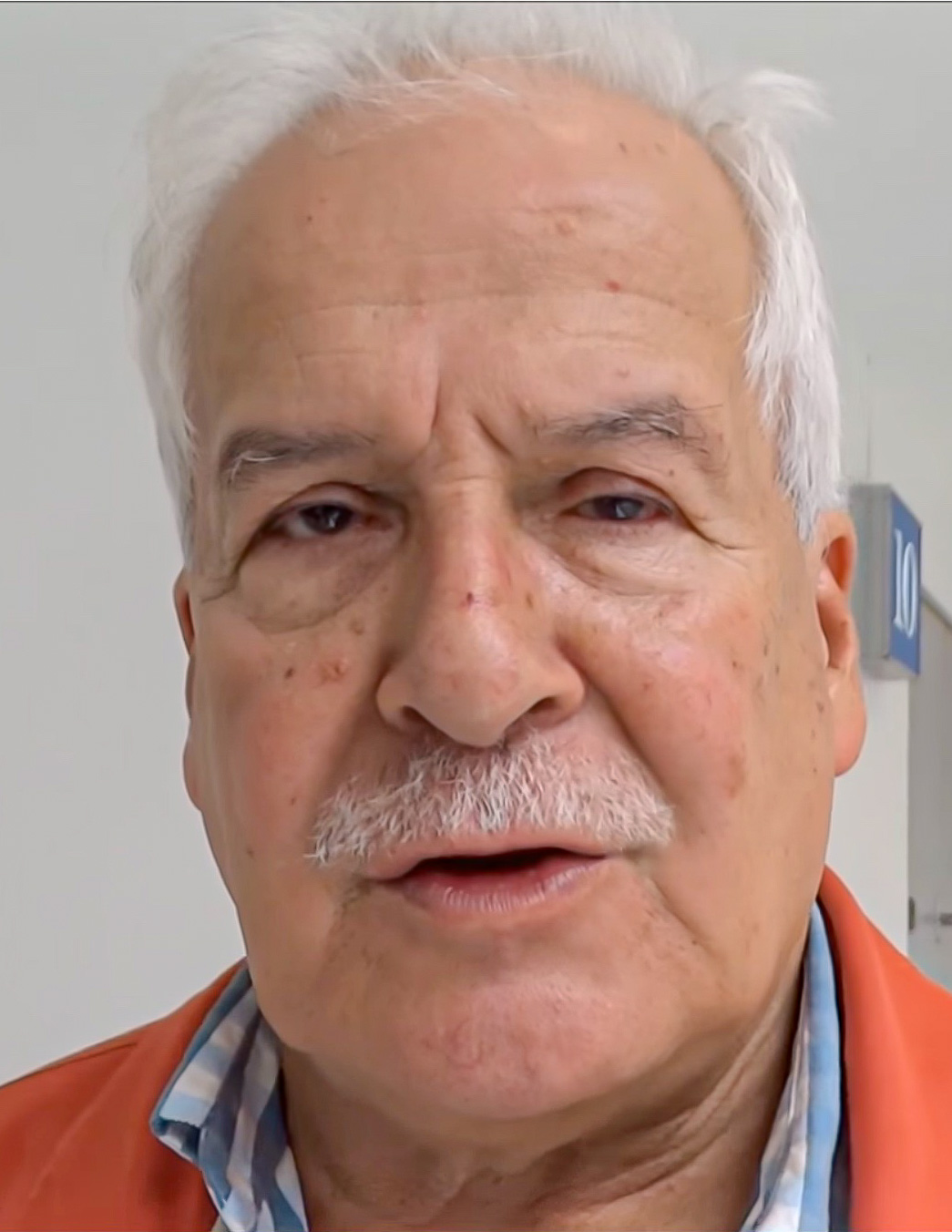
- Born: 30 October 1943 (age 82); Sevilla, Valle del Cauca, Colombia
- Occupations: Film director, screenwriter
- Years active: 1974–present

Lisandro Duque Naranjo (born 30 October 1943) is a Colombian film director and screenwriter. He has directed ten films since 1974. His 1983 film The Bicycle Racer was entered into the 13th Moscow International Film Festival. His 2001 film, The Invisible Children, was selected as the Colombian entry for the Best Foreign Language Film at the 75th Academy Awards, but it was not nominated.

== Filmography as Director ==
1974- Favor correrse atrás, 10 min., documentary
1975- No se admiten patos, 9 min., documentary
1976- Lluvia colombiana(codirected with Herminio Barrera), 12 min., documentary
1979- 38 corto, 45 largo, 15 min., fiction
1979- Hoy no frío, mañana sí, 10 min., fiction
1980- TV or no TV, 9 min., fiction
1980- Vivienda campesina, 14 min., documentary
1980- Nirma Zárate, documentary
1981- Cine Venezolano, documentary
1981- El Escarabajo, 90 min., fiction
1984- Arquitectura de la colonización antioqueña, documentary
1984- Cafés y tertulias de Bogotá, 25 min., documentary
1985- Un ascensor de película, 25 min., fiction
1985- Visa USA, 90 min., fiction
1985- El premio, corto, fiction
1988- Milagro en Roma, 90 min., fiction
1989- La Vorágine, fiction
1991- TV series, María, fiction
1992- Mediodía, corto, documentary
1994- Un día en la vida de Olimpo Cárdenas, documentary
1995- TV series, Sabor a limon
1997- TV feature, Los billaristas
2001- Los niños invisibles, 90 min., fiction
2004- TV show, Administrando Justicia
2004- TV show, Huso de razón
2004- TV show, Historia Debida
2004- Los actores del conflicto, fiction
2006- Qué plato es Colombia, documentary
2016- El soborno del cielo, fiction
2022- TV series, La verdad revelada

== Filmography as Screenwriter ==
1973- Yo pedaleo, tu pedaleas, short film
1975- La Chamba, short film
1976- Lluvia colombiana
1978- 38 largo, 45 short film
1979- Hoy no frío, mañana sí
1980- TV or no TV
1980- Vivienda campesina
1982- El Escarabajo
1983- Arquitectura de la colonización antioqueña 16 libretos para la serie de TV “Rafael Reyes, vencedor de imposibles”(“Revivamos nuestra historia”)
1985- Cafés y tertulias de Bogotá
1985- Un ascensor de película
1985- Visa USA
1986- El premio
1988- Milagro en Roma (with Gabriel García Márquez)
1989- La Vorágine
2001- Los niños invisibles
2008- Los actores del conflicto
