= List of Romanian films of 2016 =

List of Romanian films of 2016.

== List ==
Opening	Title	Studio	Cast and Crew	Genre(s)	Ref.
April 16	Fixeur	4 Proof Film	Adrian Sitaru (director), with Sorin Cociș, Tudor Aaron Istodor, Mehdi Nebbou, Nicolas Wanczycki, Diana Spătărescu, Andreea Vasile, Adrian Titieni, Cristian Ilinca	Drama	
April 22	Dincolo de calea ferată	Strada Film	Cătălin Mitulescu (director), with Ada Condeescu, Alexandru Potocean	Drama	
May 13	Tudo	Imagine8	Director: Iura Luncașu. Cast: Aylin Cadir, Oana Carmaciu, Bogdan Dumitrescu, Mihai Smarandache, Pavel Ulici	Thriller	
May 15	Câini	42 km Film, EZ Films	Bogdan Mirică (director), with Dragoș Bucur, Vlad Ivanov, Gheorghe Visu	Thriller, Western	
May 20	Bacalaureat	Les Films du Fleuve, Mobra Films, Romanian Film Board (C.N.C.)	Cristian Mungiu (director), with Vlad Ivanov, Maria Drăguș, Adrian Titieni	Drama	
June 17	Dublu	Abis Studio & Hi Film Productions	Catrinel Dănăiață (director), with Dorian Boguta, Bogdan Dumitrache, Maria Dinulescu, Corina Moise	Drama	
September 9	Sieranevada	Mandragora, Production 2006, Studioul de Creatie Cinematografica al Ministerului Culturii	Cristi Puiu (director), with Mimi Brănescu, Bogdan Dumitrache	Drama	
September 16	Selfie 69 or #Selfie 2: Cum să te măriți în trei zile	ZAZU Film	Cristina Iacob (director), with Crina Semciuc, Olimpia Melinte, Flavia Hojda, Alex Călin, Levent Sali, Vlad Logigan	Action, Comedy, Romantic	
October 7	Două lozuri	actoriedefilm.ro, Papillon Film, Kirkland, Studio Indie Production	Paul Negoescu (writer, director), with Dragoș Bucur, Dorian Boguță, Alexandru Papadopol	Comedy	
November 18	Inimi cicatrizate	HI Film Productions	Radu Jude (director), with Lucian Teodor Rus, Ilinca Hărnuț, Șerban Pavlu, Gabriel Spahiu	Biographical, Drama	
	The History of Love	2.4.7. Films, Oï Oï Oï Productions, Caramel Film	Radu Mihăileanu (director), with John Hurt, Gemma Arterton	Romantic, Drama	

Source: IMDb Cinemagia

- 6.9 on the Richter Scale, Comedy by Nae Caranfil, with Maria Simona Arsu, Laurențiu Bănescu, Radu Bânzaru, Alina Berzunteanu
- Ilegitim, Drama by Adrian Sitaru
- La drum cu tata, Comedy by Anca Miruna Lăzărescu
- Minte-mă frumos în Centrul Vechi, Comedy by Iura Luncașu
- Camera obscură, Documentary by Gheorghe Preda

== See also ==
- 2016 in Romania
- List of 2016 box office number-one films in Romania
