= 2009 in Romania =

- Decades: 1980s; 1990s; 2000s; 2010s; 2020s
- See also: Other events of 2009; History of Romania; Timeline of Romanian history; Years in Romania

Events from the year 2009 in Romania.

== Incumbents ==
- President: Traian Băsescu
- Prime Minister: Emil Boc

== Events ==
- June 7 - 2009 European Parliament election in Romania
- July 16 - Stadium Cluj Arena construction begins on the site of demolished Ion Moina Stadium.
- November 24 - The Avdhela Project, an Aromanian digital library and cultural initiative, is launched in the Romanian Peasant Museum in Bucharest.
- December 6 - 2009 Romanian presidential election
- 2009 - Badly affected by the late-2000s recession, the International Monetary Fund and other lenders agree to provide Romania a rescue package worth 20 billion Euros.

== Deaths ==
=== January ===
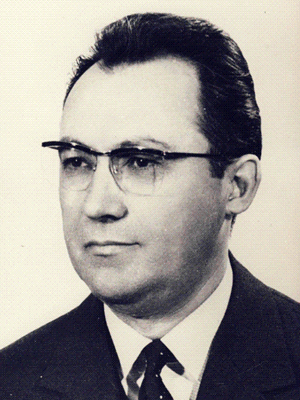
Manea Mănescu

- January 5 - Mircea Stănescu, 39, Romanian politician, MP (2004–2008), apparent suicide by gunshot.
- January 9 - István Antal, 50, Romanian Olympic ice hockey player, cardiac arrest.

=== February ===
- February 8 – Marian Cozma, 26, Romanian handball player, stabbed.
- February 27 – Manea Mănescu, 92, 50th Prime Minister of Romania (1974–1979) (born 1916)

=== March ===
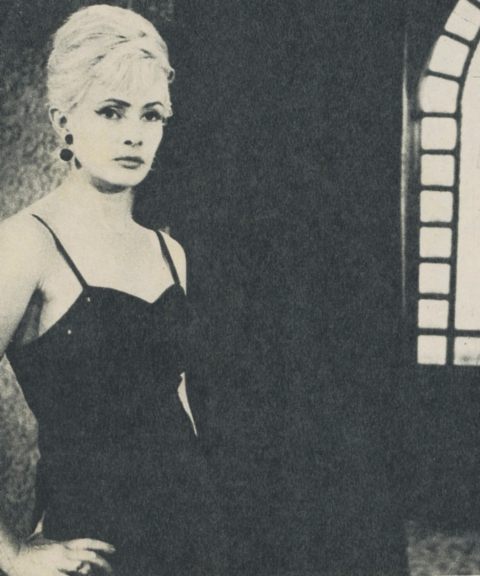
Marga Barbu

- March 19 - Ion Dolănescu, 65, Romanian singer and politician, heart attack.
- March 31 - Marga Barbu, 80, Romanian actress.

=== April ===
- April 28 - Valeria Peter Predescu, 62, Romanian singer, heart attack.

=== May ===
- May 9 - Mendi Rodan, 80, Romanian-born Israeli conductor and violinist, cancer.

=== July ===
- July 6 - Mihai Baicu, 33, Romanian footballer, heart attack.

=== August ===
- August 7 - Tatiana Stepa, 46, Romanian folk singer, cervical cancer.
- August 11 - Valeriu Lazarov, 73, Romanian-born Spanish television producer.
- August 15 - Florin Bogardo, 67, Romanian singer.

=== September ===
- September 15 - Nicu Constantin, 70, Romanian actor.

=== October ===
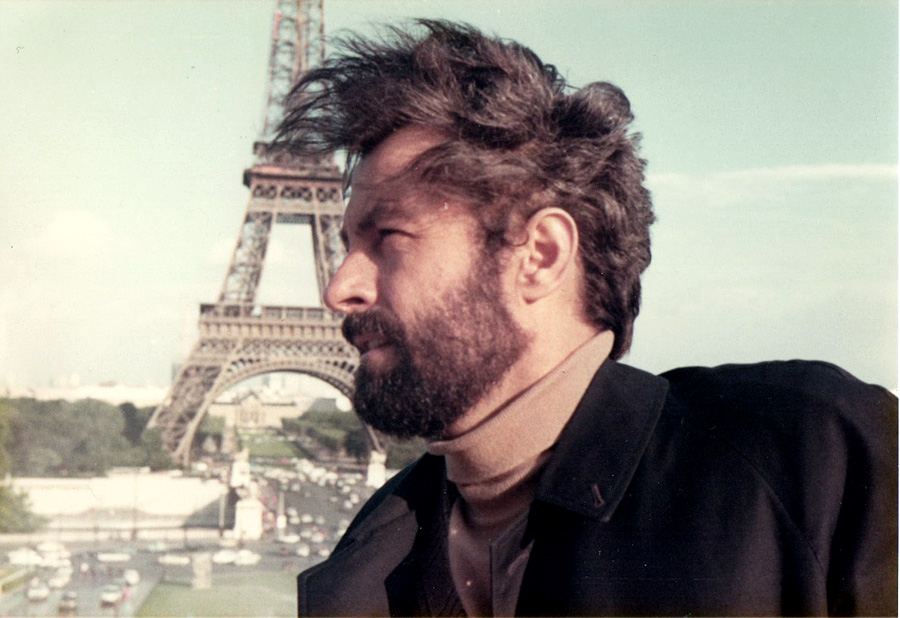
Paul Barbă Neagră

- October 3 - Vasile Louis Puscas, 94, American Bishop of St George's in Canton in the Romanian Catholic Church.
- October 13 - Paul Barbă Neagră, 80, Romanian film director and essayist.
- October 18
  - Ion Cojar, 78, Romanian actor and film director, Parkinson's disease.
  - Ovidiu Mușetescu, 54, Romanian politician, cancer.
- October 18 - Radu Timofte, 60, Romanian intelligence officer, director of the Romanian Intelligence Service (2001–2006), leukemia.
- October 25 - Thea Segall, 80, Romanian photographer who lived in Venezuela since 1958 until her death.

=== November ===
- November 10 - Gheorghe Dinică, 75, Romanian actor, cardiac arrest.
- November 26 - Ecaterina Stahl-Iencic, 60, Romanian Olympic fencer.
- November 27 - Jacques Braunstein, 78, Romanian-born Venezuelan economist, publicist and jazz disc jockey, heart failure. (Spanish)

=== December ===
- December 28 - Zoltán Horváth, 30, Romanian-born Hungarian basketball player, car accident.

== See also ==
- List of Romanian films of 2009
- 2009 in the European Union
- 2009 in Europe
- Romania in the Eurovision Song Contest 2009
