= List of Romanian films of 2009 =

This is a List of Romanian films released in 2009.

Premiere	Title	Director	Cast
23 January	Întâlniri încrucișate	Anca Damian	Andi Vasluianu, Mimi Brănescu
13 February	Hooked	Adrian Sitaru	Maria Dinulescu, Ioana Flora, Adrian Tițieni
20 March	Weekend cu mama	Stere Gulea	Adela Popescu, Gheorghe Dinică, Răzvan Vasilescu
24 April	Călătoria lui Gruber	Radu Gabrea	Marcel Iureș, Florin Piersic Jr.
8 May	Carol I	Sergiu Nicolaescu	Sergiu Nicolaescu, Marina Procopie, Andreea Măcelaru Șofron
28 May	Cea mai fericită fată din lume	Radu Jude	Andreea Boșneag, Șerban Pavlu, Vasile Muraru
3 July	Polițist, adjectiv	Corneliu Porumboiu	Dragoș Bucur, Vlad Ivanov, [oan Stoica
4 September	Călătoria lui Gruber	Radu Gabrea	Florin Piersic Jr., Marcel Iureș
25 September	Amintiri din Epoca de Aur 1	Hanno Höfer, Cristian Mungiu, Ioana Uricaru, Răzvan Mărculescu, Constantin Popescu Jr.	Călin Chirilă, Teodor Corban
2 October	Francesca	Bobby Păunescu	Monica Bârlădeanu, Dorian Boguță
16 October	Cele ce plutesc	Mircea Danieliuc	Olimpia Melinte, Valentin Popescu, Nicodim Ungureanu
23 October	Amintiri din Epoca de Aur 2	Hanno Höfer, Cristian Mungiu, Ioana Uricaru, Răzvan Mărculescu, Constantin Popescu Jr.	Diana Cavallioti, Radu Iacoban
20 November	Concertul	Radu Mihăileanu	Vlad Ivanov, Valentin Teodosiu
11 December	Cealaltă Irina	Andrei Gruzniczki	Andi Vasluianu, Dragoș Bucur, Vlad Ivanov, Oana Ioachim
