= Chasing Rainbows =

Chasing Rainbows may refer to:

== Music ==
- Chasing Rainbows Museum, museum based on the country music singer Dolly Parton

=== Albums ===
- Chasing Rainbows (album), a 1977 album by Jane Olivor
- Chasin' Rainbows, 1988, by Mickey Gilley
- Chasing Rainbows, 2007, by Baby Woodrose
- Chasing Rainbows, 2013, by Ray Wilson

=== Songs ===
- "Chasing Rainbows" (song), 1996, by Shed Seven from Let It Ride
- "Chasing Rainbows", Big Freedia song featuring Kesha, 2020
- "Chasing Rainbows", 2013, by Bring Me the Horizon, from some editions of Sempiternal
- "Chasing Rainbows", by Billy Bragg from Tooth & Nail
- "Chasing Rainbows", 1975, by Blue Magic from Thirteen Blue Magic Lane
- "Chasing Rainbows", 2013, by Gaute Ormåsen, number-one song in Norway
- "Chasing Rainbows", 2015, by Jenn Bostic from Faithful
- "Chasing Rainbows", 2011, by Jay Mya
- "Chasing Rainbows", a 2021 single by John Mellencamp from Strictly a One-Eyed Jack
- "Chasing Rainbows", by The Reverend Horton Heat from Rev
- "Chasing Rainbows", song by Stanley Huang from Atheist Like Me
- "Chasing Rainbows", song by Way Out West from Don't Look Now
- "I'm Always Chasing Rainbows", 1917 vaudeville song

== Other uses ==
- Chasing Rainbows (1930 film), American Pre-Code romantic musical film
- Chasing Rainbows (2012 film), Romanian film
- Chasing Rainbows: The Road to Oz, 2015 musical
- Chasing Rainbows (TV series), Canadian television drama miniseries, which aired on CBC Television in 1988
- Chasing Rainbows, British Channel 4 music documentary series by Jeremy Marre
- Hollyoaks: Chasing Rainbows
- "Chasing Rainbows", radio episode of WireTap
- Chasing Rainbows, 2009 novel by Rowena Summers

== See also ==
- "I'm Always Chasing Rainbows", a popular vaudeville song
