= Sebastian Mihăilescu =

Romanian director

- Born: July 17, 1983 (age 43); Făgăraș, Romania
- Occupations: Film director; screenwriter; producer
- Years active: 2012–present

Sebastian Mihăilescu (born 17 July 1983 in Făgăraș) is a Romanian film director, screenwriter, and producer.

== Early life and education ==
Mihăilescu was born in Făgăraș, Romania. He first completed a bachelor's degree in computer science before pursuing a career in film, earning both a bachelor's degree and a master's degree in film directing from the I. L. Caragiale National University of Theatre and Film in Bucharest.

== Career ==
Mihăilescu began directing short films in 2012. His 2016 short Apartament interbelic, zonă superbă, ultracentrală (Old, Luxurious Flat Located in an Ultra-Central, Desirable Neighborhood) premiered in the Pardi di Domani Competition at the Locarno Film Festival. During this period he also worked as assistant director on Radu Jude's Aferim! (2015) and One Floor Below (2015) by Radu Muntean.

=== You Are Ceaușescu to Me (2021) ===
His debut feature, the documentary Pentru mine, tu ești Ceaușescu (You Are Ceaușescu to Me, 2021), won Best Film from Central and Eastern Europe and Best Cinematography at the Ji.hlava International Documentary Film Festival, the New Talent Award at DocLisboa, and the top prize in the What's Up Doc competition at the Transilvania International Film Festival.

=== Mammalia (2023) ===
Mammalia, his fiction feature debut, had its world premiere in the Forum section of the 73rd Berlin International Film Festival in February 2023. A Romanian/Polish/German co-production shot on 16 mm film, the film blends comedy, drama, horror, and fantasy elements. World sales rights were acquired by Italian sales agent Lights On prior to its Berlin premiere. Following Berlin, it was selected for the Imagina section at the Karlovy Vary International Film Festival and screened at IndieLisboa and the Transilvania International Film Festival, among others.

== Filmography ==
=== Features ===
Year	Romanian title	English title	Type	Notes
2021	Pentru mine, tu ești Ceaușescu	You Are Ceaușescu to Me	Documentary	Premiered at Doclisboa and Ji.hlava International Documentary Film Festival
2023	Mammalia	Mammalia	Fiction	World premiere: Berlinale Forum
2024	Vampiru' Zombi	Vampiru' Zombi	Experimental film	Screened at Les Films de Cannes à Bucarest.
