= Science fiction (disambiguation) =

Science fiction is a genre of fiction dealing with the impact of imagined innovations in science or technology.

Science Fiction may also refer to:

== Music ==
=== Albums ===
- Science Fiction (Alice Cooper album), 1991 variant release of Toronto Rock 'n' Roll Revival 1969, Volume IV, or the title song
- Science Fiction (Blackmail album), 1999
- Science Fiction (Brand New album), 2017
- Science Fiction (Jonathan Thulin album) or the title song, 2015
- Science Fiction (Ornette Coleman album) or the title track, 1972
- Science Fiction (Tom Bailey album) or the title song, 2018
- Science Fiction (Hikaru Utada album), 2024

=== Songs ===
- "Science Fiction" (song), by Divinyls, 1982
- "Science Fiction", by Arctic Monkeys from Tranquility Base Hotel & Casino, 2018
- "Science Fiction", by Christine and the Queens from Chaleur humaine, 2014

== Publications ==
- Science Fiction: The 100 Best Novels, a 1985 nonfiction book by David Pringle
- Science Fiction, a 1998 book in the Bending the Landscape series by Nicola Griffith and Stephen Pagel
- A two-volume reference work by E. F. Bleiler and Richard Bleiler:
  - Science-Fiction: The Early Years, 1990
  - Science-Fiction: The Gernsback Years, 1998
- Science Fiction (American magazine) (1939–1941), later Future Science Fiction and Science Fiction Stories
- Science Fiction (Australian magazine), (1977–present)
- Science Fiction (French magazine) (1998-present)
- Science Fiction (Polish magazine), (2001–2012)
- Science Fiction Magasinet, early name (1971-1973) of Nova – Fantastiske Fortellinger
- S-F Magazine, Japanese magazine (1959-present)
- Vargo Statten Science Fiction Magazine, British magazine (1954-1956)
- The Magazine of Fantasy & Science Fiction, American magazine (1949-present)
- Neo-opsis Science Fiction Magazine, Canadian magazine (2003-present)
- Cosmos Science Fiction and Fantasy Magazine, American magazine (May to November 1977)

== Films ==
- "Science Fiction", a 2003 German film by Franz Müller

== Television ==
- "Science/Fiction", a 2023 episode of Loki

== See also ==
- Science Friction (disambiguation)
