= Mehdi Nebbou =

French actor

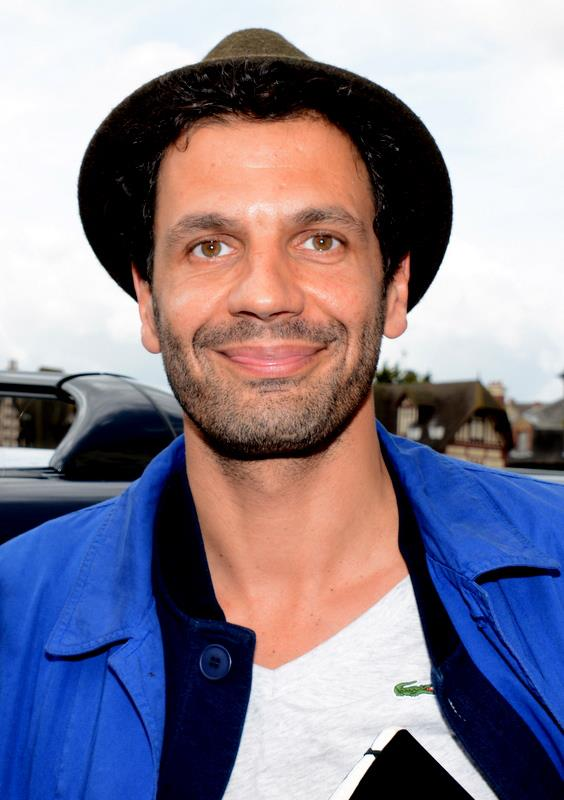
- Nebbou in 2013
- Born: Mehdi Nebbou; Bayonne, Pyrénées-Atlantiques, France
- Occupation: Actor
- Years active: 1998–present

Mehdi Nebbou is a French actor.

== Early life and education ==
Mehdi Nebbou was born in Bayonne, Pyrénées-Atlantiques, France, to a German mother and an Algerian father. His brother is the film director Safy Nebbou.

== Career ==
He started his career by appearing in the film My Sweet Home, directed by Filipos Tsitos.

In 2004, the director Samir Nasr offered him the leading role in the film Seeds of Doubt, which won the Golden Gate Award for best film at the San Francisco Film Festival. 2005 was a turning point in Nebbou's career thanks to the film Schläfer by German film director Benjamin Heisenberg. The film received excellent reviews and was selected for the 2005 Cannes Film Festival.

In 2006, he portrayed Ali Hassan Salameh in the Steven Spielberg blockbuster film Munich.

In 2007, for his performance in Teresas Zimmer, directed by German film director Constanze Knoche, he won the award for best actor at First Steps Awards.

In 2008, Nebbou worked in the Ridley Scott film Body of Lies with Leonardo DiCaprio. In it, he portrayed Nizar, an Iraqi linguistics doctorate turned Al-Qaeda operative who approaches CIA to defect after being enlisted by his jihadist superiors for suicide bombing. In addition, he played in several French TV series and films, among them as a disabled ex-middleweight boxing world champion in Douce France for which he won the award for best actor in 2009 at the Rochelle TV Festival. He played Mustafa Larbi, a sadistic and unpredictable drug dealer, in season 2 of Spiral, the successful Canal+ TV series.

In 2010, he portrayed Bruno in the Salvatore Allocca Italian romantic comedy Come trovare nel modo giusto l'uomo sbagliato and in 2011, Amin in the French action film Forces spéciales with Diane Krüger.

In 2012, he had his breakthrough into the Indian film industry thanks to the film English Vinglish, starring Sridevi.

He portrayed the lead in Les heures souterraines, directed by Philippe Harel and inspired by the novel of Delphine de Vigan in 2014.

In 2015 and 2016, he played Cyclone in six episodes of season 1 and 2 of Le Bureau des Légendes. Also In 2016, he was the co-lead in the Romanian movie The Fixer directed by Adrian Sitaru, about human traffic in Europe and under-age prostitution.

In 2017, he played a lead role in the second season of the Norwegian series Occupied and in the German series Deutschland 86.

He stars the Netflix series Baby (2018) directed by Andrea De Sica and Anna Negri.

In 2021, he played a middle-east investor in the movie "House of Gucci" by Ridley Scott.

== Personal life ==
Mehdi is fluent in French, German, English, and Italian.

== Filmography ==
Year	Title	Role	Director	Notes
1998	Spiel des Tages	Soldier	Damir Lukacevic	Short
2001	My Sweet Home	Hakim	Filippos Tsitos	
2002	Lovers & Friends	Arnaud	Christoph Schrewe	TV movie
2002	Achterbahn	Habib	Klaus Krämer	TV series (1 episode)
2004	Manson's Dream	Karim	Florian Scheibe	Short
2004	Folgeschäden	Tariq Slimani	Samir Nasr	TV movie
2005	Munich	Ali Hassan Salameh	Steven Spielberg	Central Ohio Film Critics Association - Best Ensemble; Nominated - Online Film & Television Association - Best Ensemble
2005	Sleeper	Farid Atabay	Benjamin Heisenberg	
2005	Vier Frauen und ein Todesfall	Ahmet	Harald Sicheritz	TV series (1 episode)
2006	Running on Empty	Rachid	Bülent Akinci	
2006	Fay Grim	Islamic Cleric	Hal Hartley	
2006	2 Floors Down...	Maximilian	Mindi Lee	Short
2006	Teresas Zimmer	Bilal	Constanze Knoche	TV Short; First Steps Awards - Best Actor
2006	Verschleppt - Kein Weg zurück	Tarik Al-Samirai	Hansjörg Thurn	TV movie
2007	Paris Lockdown	Hicham	Frédéric Schoendoerffer	
2007	Faits divers	Daniel	Bill Barluet	Short
2007	GSG 9 – Ihr Einsatz ist ihr Leben	Ishan Hamsa	Hans-Günther Bücking	TV series (1 episode)
2007	Tatort	Ali	Peter Fratzscher	TV series (1 episode)
2008	Mark of an Angel	The Policeman	Safy Nebbou	
2008	Body of Lies	Nizar	Ridley Scott	
2008	Secret Defense	Ahmed	Philippe Haïm	
2008	Ca$h	Vincent	Éric Besnard	
2008	Berlin Calling	Jamal the Junk	Hannes Stöhr	
2008	Les liens du sang	José Lazaga	Jacques Maillot	
2008	Long Shadows	Talat	Connie Walter	
2008	Spiral	Mustapha Larbi	Philippe Venault & Philippe Triboit	TV series (4 Episode)
2009	Magma	Paul Neville	Pierre Vinour	
2009	Le choix de Myriam	Kader	Malik Chibane	TV movie Luchon International Film Festival - Best Young Actor
2009	Douce France	Abdel Chaouche	Stéphane Giusti	TV movie
2010	Zeiten ändern dich		Uli Edel	
2010	8:28 AM	Alexander Frey	Christian Alvart	
2010	600 kilos d'or pur	Norris	Éric Besnard (2)	
2010	The Coming Days	Vincent	Lars Kraume	
2010	By Night	Martin	Juan Diaz Bohorquez.	Short
2010	Tatort	Hassan Adub	Jobst Oetzmann	TV series (1 episode)
2011	Forces spéciales	Amen	Stéphane Rybojad	
2011	Switch	Stéphane Defer	Frédéric Schoendoerffer (2)	
2011	Come trovare nel modo giusto l'uomo sbagliato	Bruno	Salvatore Allocca & Daniela Cursi Masella	
2011	Unter Verdacht	Hamid Sherzad	Andreas Herzog	TV series (1 episode)
2012	English Vinglish	Laurent	Gauri Shinde	Bollywood Movie
2012	Mince alors!	Doctor Hachemi	Charlotte de Turckheim	
2012	Die feinen Unterschiede	Herr Thalberg	Sylvie Michel	
2012	Die Besucher	Studienberater	Constanze Knoche (2)	
2012	Rue Mandar	Simon	Idit Cebula	
2012	Zappelphilipp	Sebastian Sander	Connie Walter (2)	TV movie
2012	Die Chefin	Cristian Farron	Michael Schneider	TV series (1 episode)
2013	11.6	Monaco	Philippe Godeau	
2013	Joséphine	Gilles	Agnès Obadia	
2013	Cookie	Mathieu	Léa Fazer	
2013	Back on Track	Gerome	Kilian Riedhof	
2013	Hasta mañana	David	Sébastien Maggiani & Olivier Vidal	
2013	Mein Mann, ein Mörder	Arie van Doorn	Lancelot von Naso	TV movie
2013	Vogue la vie		Claire de la Rochefoucauld	TV movie
2013	Inga Lindström	Paul Andersson	Udo Witte	TV series (1 episode)
2014	Vivre Berlin	Pierre	Nehra Stella	Short
2014	Witnesses	Eric	Hervé Hadmar	TV mini-series
2015	We Monsters	Paul	Sebastian Ko	
2015	Happy Hour	Nic	Franz Müller	
2015	Les heures souterraines	Thibault	Philippe Harel	TV movie
2015	Paare	Patient	Johann Buchholz	TV series short
2015	Le Bureau des Légendes	Cyclone	Éric Rochant & Laïla Marrakchi	TV series (3 episodes)
2015	Hard	Rémi Capelle	Laurent Dussaux & Melissa Drigeard	TV series (9 episodes)
2015	Homeland	Hussein	Alex Gansa & Gideon Raff & Howard Gordon	TV series (12 episodes)
2016	Joséphine s'arrondit	Gilles	Marilou Berry	
2016	Fixeur		Adrian Sitaru	
2017	Animals	Tarek		
2018	Mothers' Instinct	Simon Brunelle	Olivier Masset-Depasse	
2018	Deutschland 86	Jean-Luc		TV series (2 episodes)
2021	House of Gucci	Said	Ridley Scott	
2021	HPI	Adam Karadec	Stéphane Carrié & Alice Chegaray-Breugnot & Nicolas Jean	TV series (32 episodes)
2025	No Beast. So Fierce.	Imad York	Burhan Qurbani	Selected at the Berlinale, premiere in February 2025 and release in theaters on 8 May 2025.
