= Men of Deeds =

- Film poster
- Directed by: Paul Negoescu
- Written by: Radu Romaniuc; Oana Tudor
- Produced by: Anamaria Antoci
- Starring: Iulian Postelnicu; Vasile Muraru; Anghel Damian; Crina Semciuc; Daniel Busuioc; Oana Tudor; Vitalie Bichir
- Cinematography: Ana Draghici
- Edited by: Eugen Kelemen
- Music by: Marius Leftãrache
- Production companies: Tangaj Production; Papillon Film
- Release date: 14 August 2022 (Sarajevo Film Festival)
- Running time: 106 minutes
- Countries: Romania; Bulgaria
- Language: Romanian

Men of Deeds (Romanian: Oameni de treabă) is a 2022 Romanian-Bulgarian black comedy-drama film directed by Paul Negoescu, starring Iulian Postelnicu, Vasile Muraru, Anghel Damian, Crina Semciuc, Daniel Busuioc, Oana Tudor and Vitalie Bichir.

== Cast ==
- Iulian Postelnicu as Ilie
- Vasile Muraru as Mayor Constantin
- Anghel Damian as Vali
- Crina Semciuc as Cristina
- Daniel Busuioc as The Priest
- Oana Tudor as Mona
- Vitalie Bichir as Cornel

== Release ==
The film was premiered at the Sarajevo Film Festival on 14 August 2022.

== Reception ==
Guy Lodge of Variety wrote that "it’s largely thanks to Postelnicu’s tricky performance — equal parts pathetic and sympathetic, with a genuine, soulful sadness beneath the amusing tics of his wheezing vocal delivery and gurning body language — that Men of Deeds pulls off its odd, queasily tragicomic tonal shuffle as well as it does, building on the already unflattering boys-in-blue portrait painted by Two Lottery Tickets."

Neil Young of Screen Daily called the film's climax "effectively jarring".

At the 17th edition of The Gopo Awards, Romania’s most glamorous cinema celebration, the film took home six awards, including Best Film, Best Director and Best Performance by an actor for Iulian Postelnicu’s portrayal of a depressed village policeman. Men of Deeds was also recognized for Best Screenplay (Radu Romaniuc & Oana Tudor), Best Editing (Eugen Kelemen) and Best Actor in a Supporting Role (Vasile Muraru).
