= Domestic (film) =

- Film poster
- Directed by: Adrian Sitaru
- Starring: Adrian Titieni; Gheorghe Ifrim
- Release date: 21 November 2012 (MIFF)
- Running time: 82 minutes
- Country: Romania
- Language: Romanian

Domestic is a 2012 Romanian comedy film directed by Adrian Sitaru.

== Cast ==
- Adrian Titieni as Domnul Lazar
- Gheorghe Ifrim as Domnul Mihaes
- Ioana Flora as Ileana
- Clara Vodă as Doamna Lazar
