= Hooked (2008 film) =

- Promotional poster
- Directed by: Adrian Sitaru
- Written by: Adrian Sitaru
- Starring: Adrian Titieni, Ioana Flora, Maria Dinulescu, Alexandru Georgescu
- Edited by: Adrian Sitaru
- Music by: Cornel Ilie
- Production companies: Movie Partners in Motion Films, 4 Proof Film
- Distributed by: Rezofilms
- Release date: September 8, 2008 (Toronto International Film Festival)
- Running time: 84 minutes
- Country: Romania
- Language: Romanian

Hooked or Picnic is a 2008 film by Adrian Sitaru, set in Romania (original Romanian title: Pescuit sportiv).

== Premise ==
It is the story of a barbecue trip of a Romanian couple, which takes an unexpected turn when their car runs over a prostitute while driving through a forest near Bucharest. The incident throws a new light over the relationship of the two lovers, and shows how much change can come for human beings in a single day.

== Cast ==
- Adrian Titieni - Mihai
- Ioana Flora - Iubi
- Maria Dinulescu - Ana-Violeta
- Alexandru Georgescu - Van driver
- Sorin Vasilescu - Gamekeeper
- Nicodim Ungureanu - Ionut

== Release ==
The film premiered at Venice in 2008.

== Awards ==
The film received the Silver Alexander and the ex-acqueo Best Actress Award at the Thessaloniki Film Festival, and the New Voices/New Visions prize at the Palm Springs Film Festival.

== Reception ==
"The film is not only a portrait of a couple on the possible brink of a break-up, but also an exercise in style – the entire film is shot in POV, alternating fluidly between the perspectives of the various characters." commented CineEuropa. A mixed review stated, "While the provocative camera work counters the realist touch of the New Wave aesthetics, there are notable connections to Romanian reality as we know it from films of Radu Muntean & Co (Hooked, after all, is no less set in Romania than Tuesday after Christmas)." and that " And where the presence of the body in Knife in the Water sets discrete nuances – almost in need of reminding the audience of its presence -, Sitaru demonstratively exposes actress Maria Dinulescu’s breasts throughout the film to enforce sexual tension. An obvious attempt to induce an acuteness that the film never reaches." Another review concluded, "Couples will find lots to identify with in Sitaru’s examination of romance, especially as he plants the notion that Ana may not actually exist."

== See also ==
- Romanian New Wave
