= Maria Popistașu =

Romanian actress

Maria Popistașu (born 21 January 1980 in Bucharest) is a Romanian actress.

== Awards ==
- 2005 - Gemini Award for Best Supporting Actress in a Television Film or Miniseries - Sex Traffic
- 2007 - Shooting Stars Award

== Selected filmography ==
Film
Year	Title	Role	Notes
2006	Love Sick	Kiki	
2007	A Perfect Match	Alina	
2010	Tuesday, After Christmas	Raluca	
2015	One Floor Below	Laura	
2021	Întregalde	Maria	

TV
Year	Title	Role	Notes
2004	Sex Traffic	Vara Visinescu	
2004	Gunpowder, Treason & Plot	Lady Marie	
2008	Midnight Man	Kirsta	
