= Illegitimate (film) =

- Film poster
- Directed by: Adrian Sitaru
- Written by: Alina Grigore, Adrian Sitaru
- Produced by: Anamaria Antoci
- Starring: Adrian Titieni; Bogdan Albulescu; Alina Grigore
- Release date: 13 February 2016 (Berlin)
- Running time: 85 minutes
- Country: Romania
- Language: Romanian

Illegitimate (Romanian: Ilegitim) is a 2016 Romanian drama film directed by Adrian Sitaru. The film premiered at 2016 Berlin Film Festival, where it received C.I.C.A.E Award Also, the film won the Golden Arena for the Best Film (Pula, Croatia), Namur Award for the Best Screenplay and Best Actor (Adrian Titieni), and Prix Sauvage - Special Mention-Best Actress (Alina Grigore) at L’Europe autour de l’Europe, Paris. The film shows the story of two siblings, brother - Romeo Anghelescu (Robi Urs) and sister - Sasha Anghelescu (Alina Grigore), who have an incestuous love.

== Cast ==
- Adrian Titieni as Victor Anghelescu
- Bogdan Albulescu as Cosma Anghelescu
- Alina Grigore as Sasha Anghelescu
- Robi Urs as Romeo Anghelescu
- Cristina Olteanu as Gilda Anghelescu
- Miruna Dumitrescu Butache as Julie
- Liviu Vizitiu as Bogdan Dumitrescu
- Mihaela Perianu as Ema Nedela
- Adrian Iacov as Alex Barbu
- Anastasia Passerotti as Sânziana Casian
- Andrei Iordache as Daniel
- Gabriela Ursu as Doctor
- Liviu Florescu as Tudor
- Andreea Lascu
- Alexandra Dumitrescu
- Anamaria Antoci

== See also ==
- List of Romanian films of 2016
