= Police, Adjective =

2009 film

- Film poster
- Romanian: Polițist, Adjectiv
- Directed by: Corneliu Porumboiu
- Written by: Corneliu Porumboiu
- Produced by: Marcela Ursu
- Starring: Dragoș Bucur
- Edited by: Roxana Szel
- Release date: May 2009
- Running time: 115 minutes
- Country: Romania
- Language: Romanian

Police, Adjective (Romanian: Polițist, Adjectiv) is a 2009 Romanian drama film directed by Corneliu Porumboiu. The movie focuses on policeman Cristi, who is investigating a teenage boy who has been smoking hashish. Over time, Cristi begins to question the ethical ramifications of his task.

== Cast ==
- Dragoș Bucur as Cristi
- Vlad Ivanov as Captain Anghelache
- Ion Stoica as Nelu
- Irina Săulescu as Anca
- Cerasela Trandafir as Gina
- Marian Ghenea as Attorney
- Cosmin Seleși as Costi
- Șerban Georgevici as Sica
- George Remeș as Vali
- Adina Dulcu as Dana
- Dan Cogălniceanu as Gica
- Constantin Diță as officer on duty
- Alexandru Sabadac as Alex
- Anca Diaconu as Doina
- Radu Costin as Victor
- Viorel Nebunu as Alex's father
- Emanuela Țiglă as Alex's mother
- Daniel Birsan as Barman
- Bungeanu Mioara as magazine seller

== Reception ==
=== Critical reception ===
On review aggregator website Rotten Tomatoes, the film holds an approval rating of 78% based on 73 reviews, and an average rating of 7.1/10. On Metacritic, the film has a weighted average score of 81 out of 100, based on 23 critics, indicating "universal acclaim".

=== Awards ===
Police, Adjective won the Jury Prize in the Un Certain Regard section at the 2009 Cannes Film Festival.

The film was the official Romanian entry for the Academy Award for Best Foreign Language Film at the 82nd Academy Awards.

== See also ==
- Romanian New Wave
