= Boogie (2008 film) =

- Directed by: Radu Muntean
- Written by: Alexandru Baciu; Radu Muntean; Răzvan Rădulescu
- Starring: Dragoş Bucur; Anamaria Marinca; Mimi Brănescu
- Cinematography: Tudor Lucaciu
- Edited by: Andu Radu
- Music by: Electric Brother
- Production company: Multimedia Est
- Release date: 19 September 2008
- Running time: 102 minutes
- Country: Romania
- Language: Romanian

Boogie is a 2008 Romanian film written and directed by Radu Muntean.

== Plot ==
On his spring break at the seaside, with his wife and his four-year-old son, Bogdan Ciocăzanu (a.k.a. Boogie) runs into his best friends from high-school at the precise date and time that reminds all of them of their most glorious drinking trips and sexual escapades of their younger days. Frustrated that, between his job and his family, time is no longer his to manage and play with, Boogie now takes his shock dosage of freedom and spends a night to tick off all the items on the map of his youth (drinking, games, flirting, prostitutes). In the morning, after the disillusionment of the remake he experiences with his former friends, he returns to his wife.

== Cast ==
- Dragoş Bucur as Bogdan Ciocăzanu
- Anamaria Marinca as Smaranda Ciocăzanu
- Mimi Brănescu as Penescu
- Adrian Vancica as Iordache
- Vlad Muntean as Adrian Ciocăzanu
- Geanina Varga as Roxana
- Maria Alexandra Birleanu as Waitress
- Renee Harbek as Herself

== Release ==
The film premiered at the 2008 Cannes Film Festival and subsequently participated in the Karlovy Vary International Film Festival.

== See also ==
- Romanian New Wave
