= The Father Who Moves Mountains =

- Tata mută munții
- Directed by: Daniel Sandu
- Written by: Daniel Sandu
- Starring: Adrian Titieni; Elena Purea; Judith State
- Production companies: Film i Väst; Filmgate Films; Mindset Productions; Mobra Films
- Release date: September 17, 2021
- Running time: 108 minutes
- Country: Romania
- Language: Romanian

The Father Who Moves Mountains (Romanian: Tata mută munții) is a 2021 film written and directed by Daniel Sandu and starring Adrian Titieni, Elena Purea and Judith State.

== Cast ==
- Adrian Titieni as Mircea
- Elena Purea as Paula
- Judith State as Alina
- Valeriu Andriuta as Cristian Nistor
- Virgil Aioanei as Laurentiu
- Radu Botar as Doru
- Petronela Grigorescu as Valentina
- Tudor Smoleanu as Filip
- Bogdan Nechifor as Lupu
- Cristian Bota as Marian
- George Constantinescu as Operatorul Misiunii
- Natalia Calin as Mama turistei
- Marina Palii as Receptionera
- Constantin Florescu as Managerul Hotelului
- Lucian Iftime as Ofiterul de politie
