= Science Friction =

Science Friction may refer to

- Science Friction (album) by Tim Berne
- "Science Friction" (song), from the 1977 XTC album 3D EP
- Science Friction (record label), established by Roy Harper in 1993
- Science Friction (book) book by Michael Shermer
- "Science Friction!", a 1989 episode of The Raccoons
- Science Friction (1963 cartoon), 1963 cartoon starring Woody Woodpecker

== See also ==
- Science fiction (disambiguation)
