= Francesca (film) =

2009 film

- Directed by: Bobby Păunescu
- Starring: Monica Bîrlădeanu; Dorian Boguță
- Release date: 27 November 2009
- Running time: 94 minutes
- Country: Romania
- Language: Romanian

Francesca is a 2009 Romanian drama film directed by Bobby Păunescu and starring Monica Bîrlădeanu and Dorian Boguță.

== Cast ==
- Monica Bîrlădeanu - Francesca
- Dorian Boguță - Mita
- Luminița Gheorghiu - Ana
- Teodor Corban - Ion
- Dana Dogaru - Doamna Elena
- Doru Ana - Nasul
- Ion Sapdaru - Pandele
- Mihai Dorobantu - Remulus
- Gabriel Spahiu - Sofer autocar
- Dan Chiriac - Zana
