= Stuff and Dough =

2001 film by Cristi Puiu

- Original title: Marfa și banii
- Directed by: Cristi Puiu
- Starring: Alexandru Papadopol; Dragoș Bucur
- Release date: May 2001 (CFF)
- Running time: 1h 30min
- Country: Romania
- Language: Romanian

Stuff and Dough (Romanian: Marfa și banii) is a 2001 Romanian drama film directed by Cristi Puiu. The film was screened for the Directors' Fortnight at the 2001 Cannes Film Festival.

== Cast ==
- Alexandru Papadopol - Ovidiu
- Dragoș Bucur - Vali
- Ioana Flora - Bety
- Luminița Gheorghiu - Mama
- Răzvan Vasilescu - Marcel Ivanov
- Doru Ana - Doncea
- Constantin Drăgănescu - Tata
