= Dogs (2016 film) =

2016 film

- Film poster
- Romanian: Câini
- Directed by: Bogdan Mirică
- Written by: Bogdan Mirică
- Produced by: Marcela Ursu
- Starring: Dragoș Bucur
- Cinematography: Andrei Butică
- Edited by: Roxana Szel
- Music by: Codrin Lazar; Sorin Romanescu
- Production companies: 42 Km Film; EZ Films; Argo Film Ltd.
- Release date: 15 May 2016 (Cannes)
- Running time: 104 minutes
- Countries: Romania; France; Bulgaria; Qatar
- Language: Romanian

Dogs (Romanian: Câini) is a 2016 Romanian drama film directed by Bogdan Mirică. It was screened in the Un Certain Regard section at the 2016 Cannes Film Festival where it won the FIPRESCI Prize. It is Mirică's directorial debut.

The action takes place near Tulcea, in an area of the Danube sector of the Romania–Ukraine border, where groups of smugglers make the law. The city dweller Roman inherits 550 hectares (1,400 acres) of land from his recently deceased grandfather. His attempt at selling the property is disrupted by a group of thugs led by the smug, sinister Samir, throwing Roman into a violent arena with only a dilapidated shack as his fortress.

== Cast ==
- Dragoș Bucur as Roman
- Gheorghe Visu as Hogaș
- Vlad Ivanov as Samir
- Costel Cașcaval as Pila
- Constantin Cojocaru as Nea Epure
- Raluca Aprodu as Ilinca
- Cătălin Paraschiv as Agent Ana
- Emilian Oprea as Sebi Voicu
- Teodor Corban as the veterinarian
- Andrei Ciopec as Laie
- Ela Ionescu as Mara
- Marius Bardasan as Nea Toader
- Corneliu Cozmei as Nea Terente

== Awards ==
At the 2017 Gopo Awards, Dogs won for Best Lead Actor (Visu), Best Supporting Actor (Ivanov), Best Cinematography (Andrei Butică) (award shared ex aequo with Marius Panduru for Scarred Hearts), Best Sound (Sam Cohen, Sebastian Zselmye, Herve Buirett), Best Score (Codrin Lazăr, Sorin Romanescu), and Best First Feature (Bogdan Mirică).

== See also ==
- List of Romanian films of 2016
