= Doru Ana =

Romanian actor (1954–2022)

- Born: 28 February 1954; Bucharest, Romania
- Died: 11 October 2022 (aged 68); Bucharest, Romania
- Occupation: Actor
- Years active: 1980–2022

Doru Ana (28 February 1954 – 11 October 2022) was a Romanian actor. He appeared in more than forty films since 1980. Ana died in Bucharest on 11 October 2022, at the age of 68.

== Selected filmography ==
Year	Title	Role	Notes
1977	Egmont		TV adaptation
1979	The hope	Blind beggar	
1980	Foxhunting		
1980	Mountains on fire		
1983	Laugh like in life	Nedelcu	
1983	Dangerous turn	Gigi Oprea	
1985	Duckling spring		
1986	Out of too much love		
1987	Flames over treasures		
1990	The great defiance		
1990	Traveler in the Path of Wolves	member of Iron Guard	
1991	Somewhere in the East		
1993	Invisible: The Chronicles of Benjamin Knight		
1994	The stone cross	townfolk	
1994	Dark Angel: The Ascent		
1995	Huntress: Spirit of the Night		
1995	L'histoire du samedi		1 episode
1995	State of Affairs		
1996	Too late	mine foreman	
1996	Special hospital	Stancu	
1996	Personality transfer		
1996	State of things		
1997	Johnny Mysto: Boy Wizard		
1997	The Man of the Day		
1998	Next Stop Paradise	Gili	
2001	Stuff and Dough	Mister Doncea	
2005	The Death of Mr. Lazarescu	Sandu Sterian	
2008	Silent Wedding	Cârnu	
2009	Francesca	Nasul	
