= Forces spéciales =

Special Forces
- English theatrical release poster
- Directed by: Stéphane Rybojad
- Screenplay by: Michael Cooper; Stéphane Rybojad
- Produced by: Thierry Marro; Benoit Ponsaillé
- Starring: Diane Kruger; Djimon Hounsou; Denis Ménochet; Benoît Magimel; Raphaël Personnaz; Mehdi Nebbou; Tchéky Karyo
- Cinematography: David Jankowski
- Edited by: Erwan Pecher
- Music by: Xavier Berthelot
- Production company: Easy Company
- Distributed by: StudioCanal
- Release dates: 2 November 2011 (France); 12 March 2012 (UK)
- Running time: 110 minutes
- Country: France
- Language: French
- Budget: $11.2 million
- Box office: $3.4 million

Forces spéciales (English: Special Forces) is a 2011 French war adventure film directed by Stéphane Rybojad and starring Diane Kruger, Djimon Hounsou, Denis Ménochet, Benoît Magimel, Mehdi Nebbou, and Tchéky Karyo. Filmed on location in France, Djibouti, and Tajikistan, the film shows a group of elite French naval commandos on a desperate hostage rescue mission in the Afghanistan/Pakistan area.

== Plot summary ==
Kabul-based French journalist Elsa Casanova (Diane Kruger) writes an article about warlord Zaief (Raz Degan) and names him "the butcher of Kabul". Her informer Maina (Morjana Alaoui) warns her that Zaief is out for vengeance. Before Maina returns to Zaief, she bids farewell to Elsa, because she is convinced that she will die by an honour killing. Elsa tries to hold her back but fails. Her friend Amen (Mehdi Nebbou) urges Elsa to leave the country, but agrees to help her try and save Maina. Zaief ambushes and captures Elsa and Amen. Amen asks Elsa to show no fear in front of Zaief. Still, she breaks down when their friend Salemani (Greg Fromentin) is cruelly murdered in her presence.

Zaief publishes a video of Salemani's gruesome death, which eventually reaches the French government. A small French team, consisting of 4 Naval Commandos, 1 1st Marine Infantry Paratroopers Regiment and 1 Air Parachute Commando No. 10 (CPA10) members are entrusted with Elsa's rescue. They find Zaief's hideout in Pakistan and witness the execution of Maina. When they leave with Elsa and Amen, a bullet hits their wireless set. Without a means to contact their base, they cannot be found or picked up.

In lieu of another solution, they head for the Khyber Pass in order to reach their base in Afghanistan on foot. In the mountains, there is another firefight with Zaief's gunmen.

When the fugitives come across a village, Elsa asks for hospitality. Whilst resting with the locals, Marius (Alain Alivon) is shot dead by a sniper, who is then killed by the team's own marksman Elias (Raphaël Personnaz). Later on, Zaief's gunmen arrive, and Zaief himself kills Amen. When Victor is hit, they retreat into the mountains.

Elias is the second of the team to be killed while luring Zaief's soldiers away. Victor, Kovax, Tic-Tac, Lucas, and Elsa soon run into a snowstorm, but Victor subsequently goes into shock and dies. Once again Zaief attacks, and Lucas is killed, Tic-Tac is injured and Kovax kills Zaief after he takes Elsa hostage.

They still have a long way to go when they are surprised by an avalanche. Kovax saves Elsa and Tic-Tac but in the process breaks one of his legs. The two men persuade Elsa to leave them behind. Elsa, although severely exhausted, reaches a road where she is rescued. She refuses to return to Paris and is lifted out of her wheelchair by Admiral Guezennec (Tchéky Karyo) who carries her on his back to a helicopter. Together they find Kovax and Tic-Tac still alive.

== Cast ==
- Diane Kruger as Elsa Casanova
- Djimon Hounsou as Kovax
- Denis Menochet as Lucas
- Benoît Magimel as Tic-Tac
- Raphaël Personnaz as Elias
- Didier Flamand as Jacques Beauregard
- Mehdi Nebbou as Amen
- Morjana Alaoui as Maina
- Tchéky Karyo as Admiral Guezennec
- Alain Figlarz as Victor
- Alain Alivon as Marius
- Raz Degan as Zaief

== Soundtracks ==
- The opening song in the movie when the troops are seen flying in choppers is E=MC^{2} by Big Audio Dynamite.
- The song played at Kovax's birthday party is "Pick your God or Devil" by Robin Foster and Ndidi O.

== Production ==
While filming the action scenes, the actors were overseen and advised by French naval special forces according to the press folder available on the official site. Moreover, one of their former chief instructors (Alain Alivon) played his own role.

Filming took place in part at the Espagots military training camp in Caylus (Tarn-et-Garonne). The film was also shot in Djibouti as well as in civilian settings in Tajikistan and in the Pamir Mountains, which the director described as "extreme conditions" and "a tense atmosphere".

== Reception ==
On the review aggregator website Rotten Tomatoes, 15% of 13 critics' reviews are positive.

Robert Abele of Los Angeles Times concluded that "It's not only Americans who can make leaden, video game-style exercises in dumb war action. [...] Writer/producer/director Stephane Rybojad likes his Islamic fundamentalists childishly ruthless, his Afghani victims helpless and his first-person-shooter heroes full of spit, vinegar and martyr-laced bravado."

Virgin Media has a rating of 46%, judging that "With a strong cast featuring Diane Kruger and Djimon Hounsou, a powerful story and some sharp cinematography, this tense French action drama about the kidnapping of a journalist in Afghanistan is a nice change to your usual French cinema."

David Beckett of Film 365 judged that "As far as wartime action/adventure films go, Special Forces isn't a great movie, but I found it to be a remarkable cinematic achievement and one which is extremely involving"

Cinevue's Amy Wadsworth attested Forces spéciales to develop towards its end into "an engaging survival story of devotion and solidarity".

== See also ==
Similarly themed movies:

- The Wild Geese
- La Légion saute sur Kolwezi
- Ashanti (1979 film)
- Let's Get Harry
- Tears of the Sun
- Act of Valor
- The Sea Wolves
