= Jan Henrik Stahlberg =

German actor and film director (born 1970)

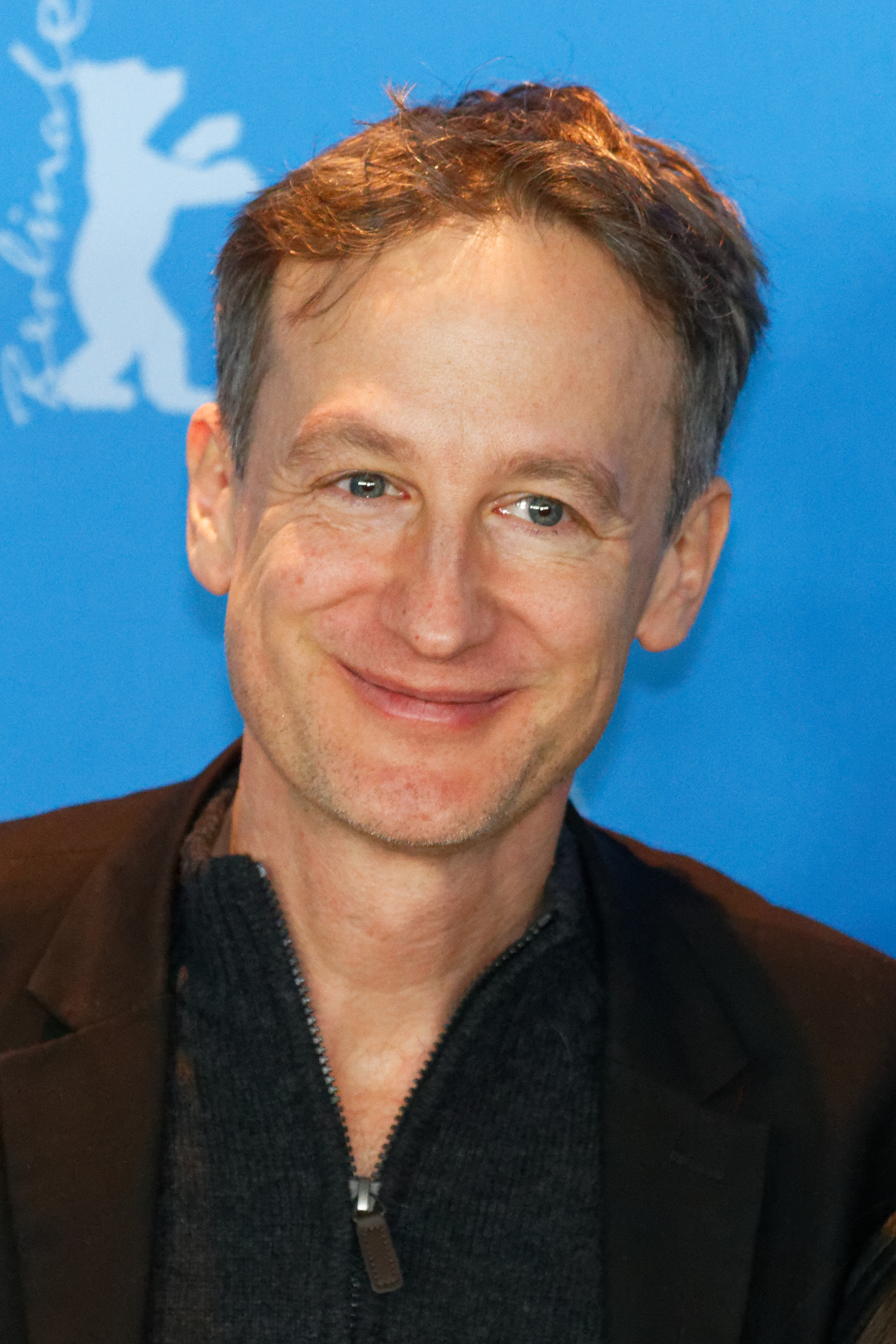
- Born: 30 December 1970 (age 55); Neuwied, West Germany
- Occupation: Actor
- Years active: 2000-present

Jan Henrik Stahlberg (born 30 December 1970) is a German actor and film director. He appeared in more than sixty films since 2000.

== Selected filmography ==
Year	Title	Role	Notes
2003	Science Fiction	Marius	
2004	Muxmäuschenstill	Mux	
2006	Tough Enough	Dr. Klaus Peters	
2008	Melodies of Spring	Thilo Kranz	
2012	Die Männer der Emden	Friedrich von Schulau	
2012	Body Complete	Phillip	
2019	The Goldfish	Michael ‘Michi’ Wolter	
