= Ioana Flora =

Romanian actress

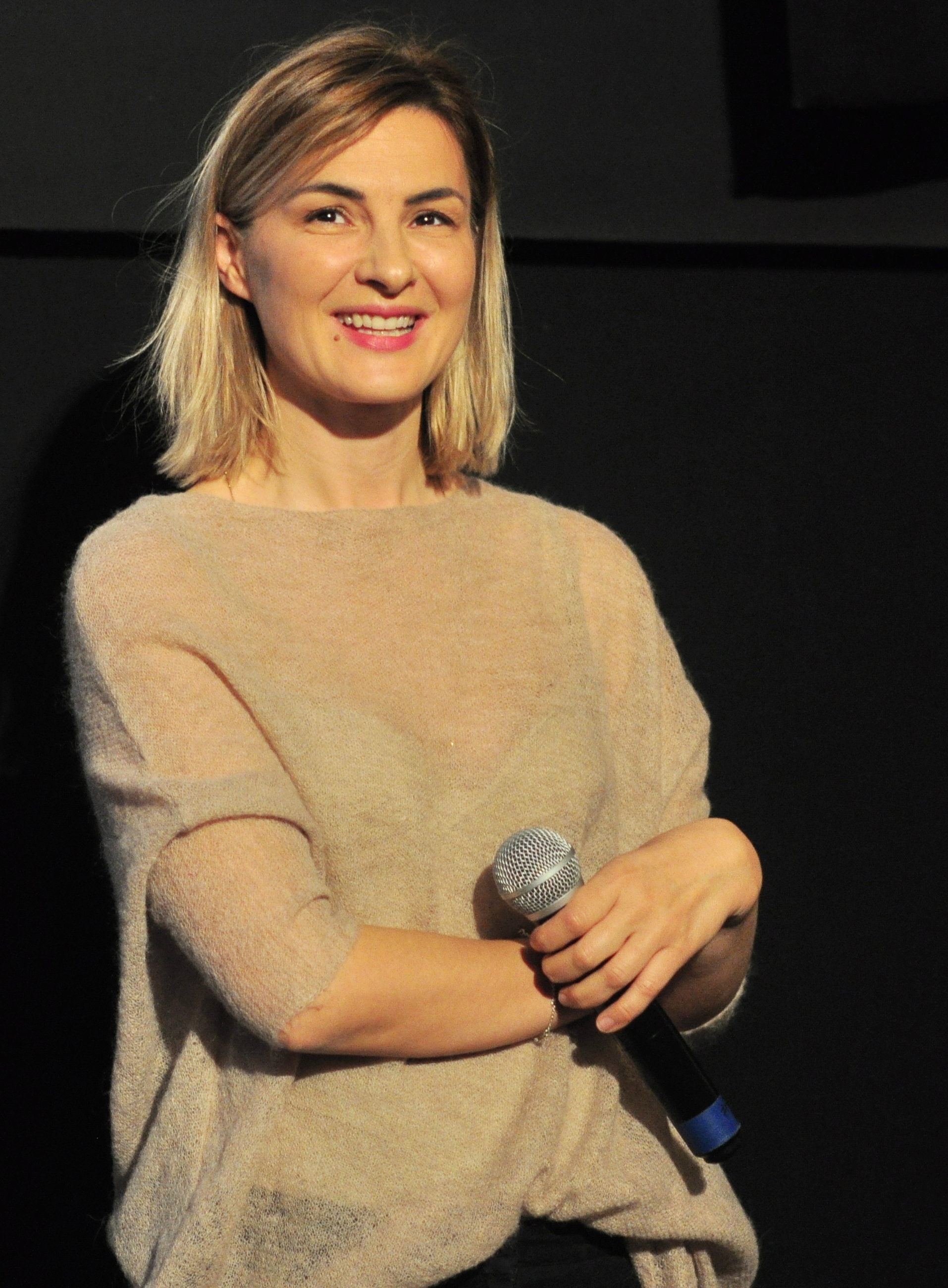
- Flora in 2017
- Born: 22 March 1975 (age 51); Pančevo, SR Serbia, SFR Yugoslavia (now Serbia)
- Occupation: Actress
- Years active: 2001–present

Ioana Flora (born 22 March 1975) is a Romanian actress. She appeared in more than twenty films since 2001.

She was born in Pančevo, Yugoslavia (now in Serbia); her father, Ioan Flora was a noted writer and journalist. After the Romanian Revolution of 1989, she moved with her family to Bucharest, where she studied from 1993 to 1997 at the Academy of Theatre and Film.

== Selected filmography ==
Year	Title	Role	Notes
2001	Stuff and Dough	Bety	
2002	Turnul din Pisa	Ioana	
2003	Tancul	Coca	
2006	Offset	Nurse	
2008	Hooked	Lubi	
2009	Pescuit sportiv	Lavinia	
2011	Outbound	Iubi	
2012	Domestic	Ileana	
2013	Déjà vu	Tania	
2015	One Floor Below	Claudia Dima	
2016	Chosen	Mrs. Feinstein	
2017	Ana, mon amour	Irina	
2019	Zavera	Roxana	
2024	The New Year That Never Came	Mariana	
