= Happy Hour (2015 German film) =

2015 film directed by Franz Müller

- German: Happy Hour
- Directed by: Franz Müller
- Written by: Franz Müller
- Produced by: Sonja Ewers, Steve Hudson
- Starring: Simon Licht, Mehdi Nebbou, Alexander Hörbe
- Cinematography: Bernhard Keller
- Edited by: Gesa Jäger
- Music by: Cherilyn MacNeil
- Release dates: 29 June 2015 (Munich Film Festival); 12 June 2016 (Germany)
- Running time: 95 minutes
- Countries: Germany, Ireland
- Languages: German, English

Happy Hour is a 2015 German comedy film by director Franz Müller. The film premiered at the Munich Film Festival on 29 June 2015 and was released in German cinemas on 12 May 2016. The main roles are played by Simon Licht, Mehdi Nebbou and Alexander Hörbe.

== Synopsis ==
The introverted man in his mid-forties, Hans-Christian, who everyone calls H.C., is in a very bad way. He is going through a kind of midlife crisis. For years, his wife cheated on him every day with a lover under the text message codeword "Happy Hour" and then left him. This is extremely hard on Hans-Christian. In order to rebuild the emotionally battered man, his two childhood friends, the stuffy and macho Wolfgang and the cynical know-it-all Nic, come up with the idea of taking him on a two-week trip to Ireland. Wolfgang owns a small, picturesque cottage there and they want to take Hans-Christian's mind off things.

So the three mid-forties travel to the rainy Irish province to relive their youthful years with fishing trips, lots of Guinness and whiskey, undressed wood chopping and wild party nights in the pub and to make Hans-Christian feel that there is still life after the break-up. After a carefree start on the island, over time each of the three friends, soon approaching 50, has to ask themselves whether they have achieved all their goals and wishes in life. Increasingly, the exuberant joy and relaxation among the three friends give way to arguments and squabbles. The question arises as to whether the friendship that bound them together in their youth still exists. Which is also put to a tough and unforeseen test by a group of Irish women. At the end of their short vacation, Nic and Hans-Christian fly back home.Only Wolfgang stays behind in his vacation home, trying to decide whether he wants to return to his family or to the self-confident Irish woman Kat, whom he met during his stay in Ireland.

== Cast ==
- Simon Licht as Wolfgang
- Mehdi Nebbou as Nic
- Alexander Hörbe as HC
- Susan Swanton as Kat
- Christine Deady as Fiona
- Tanya Flynn as Beckie
- Barbara Schwarz as Britta
- Derin Akyaman as Luca
- Loïc Lopes as Ruben
- Carla Voigt as Leonie
- Daniela Lebang as Amelie (uncredited)

== Production ==
Happy Hour was made with financial support from the Filmförderungsanstalt (FFA), the Film- und Medienstiftung NRW, the Kuratorium junger deutscher Film and in cooperation with WDR and Arte Deutschland. The film was shot from 15 October 2013 to 27 November 2013 in Skibbereen, County Cork, and in North Rhine-Westphalia, Germany.

== Accolades (Selection) ==
- 2015: Tallinn Black Nights Film Festival - Grand Prize - Nomination for Franz Müller
- 2015: Filmfest München - Young German Cinema Award in the category Best Production for Sonja Ewers and Steve Hudson
