= Stephen DeRosa =

American actor

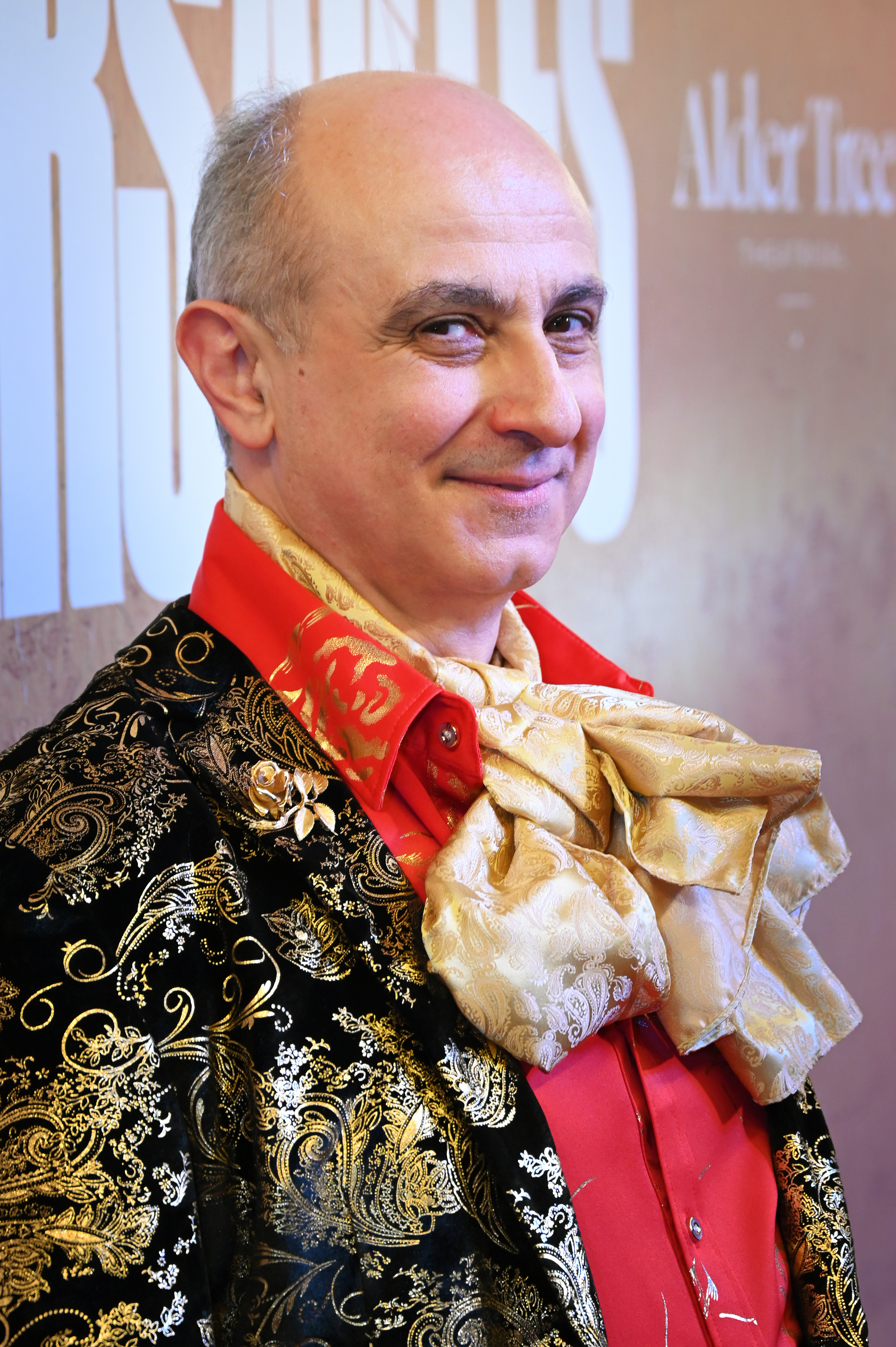
- DeRosa in 2025
- Born: June 10, 1968 (age 58); New York City, New York, U.S.
- Education: Georgetown University (BA); Yale University (MFA)
- Occupation: Actor
- Years active: 1993–present
- Website: stephenderosa.com

Stephen DeRosa (born June 10, 1968) is an American actor. He is best known for his theatre credits and portraying Eddie Cantor in the television series Boardwalk Empire (2010–2013).

== Education ==
He attended Georgetown University in Washington, D.C., as an undergraduate, and graduated from the Yale School of Drama in New Haven, Connecticut, with a Master of Fine Arts in 1995.

== Career ==
Although DeRosa's career has primarily been in the theatre, he has also made several television appearances. These include the television film The Man Who Came to Dinner (2000), guest appearances on the television series Law & Order, Third Watch, and Ugly Betty, a recurring role as Eddie Cantor on Boardwalk Empire, and his appearance in the miniseries Wormwood (2017).

He appeared at a staged reading of You Can't Take It with You for The Acting Company at Playwrights Horizons, with F. Murray Abraham.

== Theatre credits ==
Year	Production	Role	Venue	Ref.
1993	Measure for Measure	Ensemble	The Public Theater, the Delacorte Theater	
1995	Twelfth Night	Feste	Yale Repertory Theatre	
1995	Falsettos	Dr. Mendel	Arden Theatre Company, Philadelphia	
1998–1999	Love's Fire: Fresh Numbers by Seven American Playwrights	Various	The Acting Company, Off-Broadway	
1998–1999	Do Re Mi	Skin Demopolous	New York City Center Encores!	
1998–1999	The Mystery of Irma Vep	Lord Edgar Hillcrest; Jane Twisden	Westside Theatre, Off-Broadway	
2000	Wonderful Town	Speedy Valenti	New York City Center Encores!	
2000	The Man Who Came to Dinner	Professor Metz	American Airlines Theatre, Broadway	
2001	Newyorkers	Stephen	Manhattan Theatre Club, Off-Broadway	
2001	The It Girl	Monty	York Theatre, Off-Broadway	
2001	Street Scene	Dick McGann	Williamstown Theatre Festival	
2002	Into the Woods	The Baker	Ahmanson Theatre, Los Angeles, and Broadhurst Theatre, Broadway	
2003	Henry IV	Bardolph; Shallow understudy; Silence understudy	Lincoln Center Theater, Broadway	
2004	Twentieth Century	Beard; Max Jacobs	American Airlines Theatre, Broadway	
2004–2007	Hairspray	Wilbur Turnblad	First national tour (2004–2005) Neil Simon Theatre, Broadway (2005–2007)	
2007	Walmartopia	Dr. Normal and Otis	Minetta Lane Theatre, Off-Broadway	
2008	Peter Pan	Captain Hook	Stephen Sondheim Center for the Performing Arts, Fairfield, IA	
2010–2012	West Side Story	Gladhand; Krupke understudy; Doc understudy	National tour	
2013	The Nance	Chauncey Miles understudy	Lyceum Theatre, Broadway	
2014–2015	On the Town	Ensemble; Judge understudy	Lyric Theatre, Broadway	
2016	These Paper Bullets!	Leo Messina	Atlantic Theater Company	
2017	Assassins	Charles Guiteau	Yale Repertory Theatre	
2017	The Government Inspector	The Hospital Director	Red Bull Theater, Off-Broadway	
2018	Anything Goes	Moonface Martin	Arena Stage	
2019	Gary: A Sequel to Titus Andronicus	Gary standby	Booth Theatre, Broadway	
2019	Chasing Rainbows: The Road to Oz	Louis B. Mayer	Paper Mill Playhouse	
2021	The Alchemist	Ananias	Red Bull Theater, Off-Broadway	
2022	Mr. Saturday Night	Bobby understudy and others	Nederlander Theatre, Broadway	
2022	Joy	Rudy	George Street Playhouse	
2023–2024	Little Shop of Horrors	Mr. Mushnik	Westside Theatre, Off-Broadway	
2023–2024	Boop! The Musical	Grampy	CIBC Theatre, Chicago	
2024	The Queen of Versailles	John Mallery	Colonial Theatre, Boston	
2024–2025	Boop! The Musical	Grampy	Broadhurst Theatre, Broadway	
2024–2025	The Queen of Versailles	John Mallery	St. James Theatre, Broadway	
2025	The Boys from Syracuse	Merchant of Ephesus	Red Bull Theater benefit concert	
2026	City of Angels (musical)	Buddy/Irwin	Ogunquit Playhouse	
