= Eva-Maria Weerts =

German film producer

- Other name: Eva Weerts
- Occupation: Film producer

Eva-Maria Weerts is a German film producer.

== Life and work ==
Weerts studied film production at the Deutsche Film- und Fernsehakademie Berlin (DFFB) from 1999 to 2004. The graduation film she produced, God's Ways (Gottes Wege) by Eva Neymann won the German First Steps Award for best documentary film in 2007.

Weerts shot her own documentary titled Wir woll'n die Ärzte sehn, about three friends and fans of the German band Die Ärzte, which was released on DVD in 2003 and broadcast on German television channel BR alpha on May 18, 2007.

Since 2005, Weerts has been working as a film producer. In 2016, she co-founded the Berlin-based film production company Mizzi Stock Entertainment with Franz Müller. With the company, Weerts produced films including Notturno and Die Tagebücher von Adam und Eva (The Diaries of Adam and Eve).

Weerts is a member of the German professional association Arbeitsgemeinschaft Dokumentarfilm (short form: AG DOK) and the Austrian Film Academy (Österreichische Filmakademie).

== Selected filmography ==
=== Producer ===
- 2005: Fremde Kinder – Das Meer sehen (TV documentary series)
- 2006: God's Eyes (Wege Gottes) (documentary)
- 2010: Mädchengeschichten – Orchideen in Pankow (TV documentary series)
- 2020: Notturno (co-producer)
- 2022: Alice Schwarzer (documentary)
- 2023: The Diaries of Adam and Eve (Die Tagebücher von Adam und Eva), (feature film)
- 2025: All That's Due (Das Glück der Tüchtigen), (feature film)

=== Other ===
- 2001: Ayla und die Strumpfhose (short film), (cinematographer)
- 2003: Wir woll'n die Ärzte sehn (documentary), (director)
- 2007: Der blinde Fleck (feature film), (actress)
- 2011: ¡Vivan las antípodas! (documentary), (executive producer)
- 2013: Cold Rehearsal (Kalte Probe) (feature film), (production supervisor)
- 2023: The Diaries of Adam and Eve (Die Tagebücher von Adam und Eva), (feature film), (executive producer)

== Selected awards ==
- 2020: British Independent Film Awards – Nominated for Best International Independent Film for Notturno
- 2021: Cinema Eye Honors – Nominated for Outstanding Achievement in Production for Notturno
- 2023: Austrian Film Award – Nominated for Best Documentary for Alice Schwarzer
- 2023: Filmfest München – Nominated for German Cinema New Talent Award for Production for The Diaries of Adam and Eve
- 2025: Filmfest München – Nominated for German Cinema New Talent Award for Production for All That's Due
