= Quod Erat Demonstrandum (film) =

- Film poster
- Directed by: Andrei Gruzsniczki
- Written by: Andrei Grusznicki
- Produced by: Velvet Moraru
- Starring: Sorin Leoveanu; Ofelia Popii
- Cinematography: Vivi Drăgan Vasile
- Edited by: Dana Bunescu
- Music by: Pedro Negrescu
- Production company: Icon production
- Release dates: 12 November 2013 (Rome); 10 October 2014
- Running time: 107 minutes
- Country: Romania
- Language: Romanian

Quod Erat Demonstrandum is a 2013 Romanian drama film directed by Andrei Gruzsniczki, starring Sorin Leoveanu and Ofelia Popii. It tells the story of two Romanian academics who are persecuted by Securitate, the secret police, in 1984. The title is a Latin phrase with the meaning "which had to be proven". The film is in black and white. It had a budget corresponding to 700,000 euro, of which 1.59 million Romanian leu came from the National Center for Cinema.

The film premiered at the Rome Film Festival where it won the Jury Special Prize. It won several other awards and was hailed as the best Romanian film of 2014 by several critics, but had fewer than 5000 admissions in its home country, which was seen as a disappointment.

== Cast ==
- Sorin Leoveanu as Sorin Pârvu
- Ofelia Popii as Elena Buciuman
- Florin Piersic Jr. as Alexandru Voican
- Virgil Ogăşanu as Martin Scăunaşu
- Marc Titieni as David Buciuman
- Dorian Boguță as Lucian Amohnoaiei
- Alina Berzunţeanu as Valeria Amohnoaiei
- Lucian Ifrim as officer Marinescu
- Dan Tudor as colonel Deleanu
- Mihai Călin as professor Dima
- Adina Cristescu as David's supervisor

== Reception ==
Jay Weissberg of Variety wrote: "Leoveanu and Popii are known for their stage rather than cinematic work, yet they're ideally cast and exhibit zero theatricality. ... Black-and-white visuals have a suitable matte range, allowing for gradations in shadow and tone that wouldn't have been possible on digital or color stock. Cristian Niculescu's production design is uncanny, and Gruzsniczki does a commendable job integrating thesps with their surroundings in a way that feels completely natural."
