= Bucharest Non Stop =

- Directed by: Dan Chișu
- Starring: Gheorghe Ifrim; Ion Besoiu
- Release date: 4 June 2015 (Transilvania International Film Festival)
- Running time: 86 minutes
- Country: Romania
- Language: Romanian

Bucharest Non Stop (Romanian: București NonStop) is a 2015 Romanian comedy-drama film directed by the Romanian actor, director and film producer Dan Chișu.

== Cast ==
- Gheorghe Ifrim - Achim
- Ion Besoiu - Bătrânul (The Old Man)
- Dorina Lazăr - Bătrâna (The Old Woman)
- Adrian Titieni - Giani
- Olimpia Melinte - Jeny
- Alexandru Papadopol - Gelu
- Maria Obretin - Dora
- Dorian Boguță - Bodo
