= Zavera =

2019 Romanian drama film

- Theatrical release poster
- Directed by: Andrei Gruzsniczki
- Screenplay by: Andrei Gruzsniczki; Mircea Staiculescu
- Produced by: Georgiana Constantin; Alexandru Teodorescu
- Starring: Dorian Boguță; Șerban Pavlu; Ioana Flora
- Cinematography: Tudor Vladimir Panduru
- Edited by: Dana Bunescu
- Music by: Cristian Lolea
- Production company: Saga Film
- Release dates: 23 November 2019 (Cairo International Film Festival); 29 November 2019 (Romania)
- Running time: 96 minutes
- Country: Romania
- Language: Romanian
- Box office: $1,670

Zavera (English: "Turmoil") is a 2019 Romanian drama film directed by Andrei Gruzsniczki, written by Gruzsniczki and Mircea Staiculescu, and produced by Saga Film. The plot follows Ștefan (played by Dorian Boguță), a construction engineer, who enters an existential crisis after his best friend and business partner Nic (played by Șerban Pavlu) dies in a bicycle accident. The film is subtitled "eight Gymnopédies" and is structured in eight days in the life of Ștefan after Nic's death.

The writing of Zavera started in 2014 with a script development workshop organized by Sources 2 in Norway. During the next three years, Gruzsniczki struggled to find producers for the film. The production started in 2018. The initial idea for the film was to follow eight characters, but because of financial constraints it was reduced to only one. The score contains two of Erik Satie's Gnossiennes, performed by the original music composer Cristian Lolea.

The film premiered on November 23, 2019 at the Cairo International Film Festival and was theatrically released in Romania on November 29, 2019. It received two nominations at the 2020 Gopo Awards, Coca Bloos for Best Actress in a Supporting Role and Lolea for Best Original Music, but neither of them won.

== Cast ==
- Medeea Marinescu – Nona
- Ioan Isaiu – directorul de bancă
- Șerban Pavlu – Nic
- Ioana Flora – Roxana
- Dorian Boguță – Ștefan
- Coca Bloos – mama Tia
- Ioana Abur – Dora
- Richard Bovnoczki – soțul Dorei
- Ilie Gâlea – șef șantier 2
- Silvia Năstase – vecina amabilă
- Ioana Ana Macaria – Magda
- Dan Tudor – Marius
- Florinela Grapini – soția lui Marius
- Florentina Năstase – Ani
- Ioana Chițu – fata care vinde flori
- Liana Mărgineanu – Venera
- Irina-Halina Cornișteanu – doctorița
- Ioana Talașman – Ioana
- Maria Talașman – Maria
- Ciprian-Valentin Lighean – șef șantier 1
- Viorel Iosif – părintele
