= A Month in Thailand =

- Directed by: Paul Negoescu
- Screenplay by: Paul Negoescu; Vlad Trandafir
- Starring: Sînziana Nicola; Ștefan Munteanu; Ioana Anastasia Anton; Tudor Istodor
- Cinematography: Andrei Butică
- Edited by: Alexandru Radu
- Music by: Codrin Lazar
- Release date: 2012
- Language: Romanian

A Month in Thailand (Romanian: O lună în Thailanda) is a 2012 Romanian romantic comedy film co-written and directed by Paul Negoescu, in his feature directorial debut. It premiered at the 69th Venice International Film Festival, in the Venice International Film Critics' Week sidebar.

== Cast ==
- Sînziana Nicola as Nadia
- Ștefan Munteanu as Kiri
- Ioana Anastasia Anton as Adina
- Tudor Istodor as Alex
- Sabina Posea as Bianca
- Simona Ghiță as Mona
- Andrei Mateiu as Radu
- Raluca Aprodu as Raluca
- Ionuț Grama as Toma
- Bogdan Cotleț as Ducu
- Maria Ploae as Elena
- Victoria Răileanu as Emilia
