= Întregalde (film) =

2021 Romanian film

- Directed by: Radu Muntean
- Written by: Alexandru Baciu; Radu Muntean; Răzvan Rădulescu
- Produced by: Dragos Vilcu
- Starring: Maria Popistașu; Luca Sabin; Ilona Brezoianu; Alex Bogdan
- Cinematography: Tudor Vladimir Panduru
- Edited by: Andu Radu
- Production companies: Multimedia Est; The East Company Productions
- Release date: July 11, 2021 (Cannes)
- Running time: 104 minutes
- Country: Romania
- Language: Romanian

Întregalde is a 2021 Romanian drama thriller film co-written and directed by Radu Muntean. The film centres on a group of humanitarian aid workers in Romania who bring supplies to poverty-stricken areas in the Transylvania region, whose trip to the village of Întregalde is derailed after they pick up a disoriented old man (Luca Sabin) who needs a ride.

The film's cast includes Maria Popistașu, Ilona Brezoianu, Alex Bogdan, Toma Cuzin and Gabor Bondi. It was shot in 2020 in the Apuseni Mountains region. Muntean has described the film as inspired by real volunteer expeditions to deliver supplies to remote Romanian towns; after directly participating in two such trips, he was motivated to think about how much the effort actually helped the villagers as opposed to simply being a way for wealthy urbanites to congratulate themselves for their generosity.

The film premiered in the Directors' Fortnight program at the 2021 Cannes Film Festival. It had its North American premiere at the 2021 Toronto International Film Festival, and is to be followed by a screening at the 2021 New York Film Festival.
