= Notturno (film) =

2020 documentary film

- Italian theatrical release poster
- Directed by: Gianfranco Rosi
- Story by: Gianfranco Rosi
- Produced by: Donatella Palermo; Paolo Del Brocco; Gianfranco Rosi; Serge Lalou; Camille Laemlé; Orwa Nyrabia; Franz Müller (co-producer); Eva-Maria Weerts (co-producer)
- Cinematography: Gianfranco Rosi
- Edited by: Jacopo Quadri
- Production companies: 21 Unofilm; Stemal Entertainment; Rai Cinema; Les Films d'Ici; Arte France Cinéma; No Nation Films; Mizzi Stock Entertainment
- Distributed by: 01 Distribution (Italy); Météore Films (France)
- Release dates: 8 September 2020 (Venice); 9 September 2020 (Italy); 7 April 2021 (France)
- Running time: 100 minutes
- Countries: Italy; France; Germany
- Languages: Arabic; Kurdish
- Box office: $119,354

Notturno is a 2020 documentary film written and directed by Gianfranco Rosi. Shot during three years (2017-2019), it follows the Middle East population who live in war zones.

The film had its world premiere in the main competition of the 77th Venice International Film Festival on 8 September 2020. It was theatrically released in Italy on 9 September 2020 by 01 Distribution. It was selected as the Italian entry for the Best International Feature Film at the 93rd Academy Awards, but it was not nominated.

== Synopsis ==
Shot over the course of three years between Syria, Iraq, Kurdistan, and Lebanon, Notturno follows different people from areas near war zones in the Middle East who are trying to start over again with their everyday lives. A group of female soldiers is shown standing guard, clearing empty buildings and relaxing in their barracks. A man in a small boat hunts for water fowl at night with the sound of machine gun fire in the distance. At a psychiatric hospital, a group of patients are given scripts to memorize for a play about the current state of their homeland and are shown rehearsing their parts. A boy, Ali, is paid five dollars a day to help a duck hunter. A couple admire the beauty of the night sky; the man then puts on his thob, picks up his drum, and walks the streets of the town playing the instrument and singing a song in praise of the prophet. At a school, as a form of therapy, children draw graphic pictures of the war atrocities they witnessed and describe their experiences to their teacher. One of the most cruel scenes is the one which shows a veiled Kurdish mother in the jail cell where her son had been tortured and killed. Another scene concerns a mother listening to phone messages from her daughter who has been kidnapped by ISIS terrorists who are demanding a ransom.

== Production ==
In January 2018, it was announced Gianfranco Rosi would direct the film, with Météore Films distributing the film in France.

== Release ==
The film had its world premiere at the 77th Venice International Film Festival on 8 September 2020. It also screened at the Toronto International Film Festival on 15 September 2020 and at the New York Film Festival on 6 October 2020. It was also selected to screen at the Telluride Film Festival in September 2020, prior to its cancellation due to the COVID-19 pandemic. In December 2020, Super LTD acquired U.S. distribution rights to the film.

It was released in Italy on 9 September 2020 by 01 Distribution. It is scheduled to be released in the United States through virtual cinema on 22 January 2021, followed by video on demand on 29 January 2021. It is scheduled to be released in France on 7 April 2021, and it was screened in Norway in October 2022 at the Mirage Film Festival.

== Reception ==
=== Critical reception ===
Notturno holds an 82% approval rating on review aggregator website Rotten Tomatoes, based on 66 reviews, with an average of 7.3/10. The site's critical consensus reads, "Notturno contemplates the cost of war in starkly human terms by surveying the lives of people living under the threat of destruction." On Metacritic, the film holds a rating of 75 out of 100, based on 21 critics, indicating "generally favorable reviews".

== See also ==
- List of submissions to the 93rd Academy Awards for Best International Feature Film
- List of Italian submissions for the Academy Award for Best International Feature Film
