= Wallace Line (film) =

2009 film directed by Franz Müller

- Film poster
- German: Die Liebe der Kinder
- Directed by: Franz Müller
- Written by: Franz Müller
- Produced by: Harry Flöter, Jörg Siepmann
- Starring: Marie-Lou Sellem, Alex Brendemühl
- Cinematography: Christine A. Maier
- Edited by: Stefan Stabenow
- Music by: Tobias Ellenberg, Daniel Backes
- Release dates: June 27, 2009 (Munich Film Festival); August 26, 2010 (Germany)
- Running time: 84 minutes
- Country: Germany
- Language: German

Wallace Line (German: Die Liebe der Kinder) is a German relationship drama by director Franz Müller from 2009, which tells the story of two single parents, who start a patchwork family together, in which the two children also fall in love with each other. The film was released in German cinemas on August 26, 2010.

== Synopsis ==
Librarian Maren and tree trimmer Robert, both single parents, meet after an internet date at a highway service station somewhere in Germany.

The unlikely couple start a patchwork family together. Everything seems perfect until Maren catches her daughter Mira in bed with Robert's son Daniel. While the parents' love increasingly collapses, the children's love grows stronger and stronger.

The movie reaches its climax when the children tell their parents that they want to get married and emigrate. The parents' love breaks down completely and the younger couple also separate after a short time. While Mira moves into a shared apartment with her friends and Daniel emigrates, the parents Robert and Maren dare to make a new start together long after their separation.

== Cast ==
- Marie-Lou Sellem as Maren
- Alex Brendemühl as Robert
- Katharina Derr as Mira
- Tim Hoffmann as Daniel
- Michael Sideris as Stefan
- Katharina Linder as Simone
- Jürgen Rißmann as Jürgen
- Nicole Heesters as Maren's mother
- Klaus Manchen as Robert's father
- Norma Raimondi as Robert's mother
- Ingrid Kaltenegger as Yvonne
- Sybille J. Schedwill as Inga
- Alexander Simon as Jan
- Leila Abdullah as Helen
- Klaus Bellinger as Marc
- Steffi Niederzoll as Marie

== Reception ==
=== Critical Response ===
In addition to the German reviews on its German theatrical release, the film was also reviewed at its international festival presentations.

Eleonora Mignoli reviewing for FilmDoo praises the "succinct storytelling", because she believes, that there "are stories that excite us for the duration of its run time, that let us walk out of the movie theatre moved and galvanized but that are soon forgotten; then there are the ones that stay with us longer, that pop into our minds weeks or even months later in the least expected circumstances. Wallace Line is part of the second group." Another interesting aspect for the critic "is the depiction of each gender’s relationship with love. Neither Maren nor Robert are victims of their roles as man and woman, father and mother, husband and wife. While both partly fulfil their gender expectations (he’s a self-made landscape designer, she’s a refined librarian) they are not entrapped by the stereotype." This would also correspond to the children in the movie, who would not conform to gender stereotypes. Mignoli criticizes the fact that the happy ending, in which "Maren and Robert meet again after a long breakup, forces the hand of what was an otherwise perfectly life-like depiction of a love story." At the end of her critique, Mignoli concludes that the international title could refer to Maren's work on Alfred Russel Wallace. She goes on to write, “This second interpretation seems to present a colder view, in which the mistakes of the parents condemn the happiness of the children. The truth is in the eye of the beholder.”

In his review for Cineuropa, Theodore Schwinke writes that Franz Müller's Wallace Line "combines elements of unadorned, realist drama and traditional love story in a believable and moving meditation of the various natures of love." Schwinke continues: “As the separate romances dissolve, it becomes clear that the love of children in the original title, Die Liebe der Kinder, is quite alien to that of adults.” The story would also suggest, "that love must evolve if it is to survive.” He concludes by noting that "Müller's script is efficient enough to keep the plot brisk — and gives cinematographer Christine A. Maier opportunity to create interstices of nature photography between chapters. The writing is far from spare, however, and the audience can see the debt he owes (and acknowledges) to Tolstoy."

=== Accolades (Selection) ===
- 2009: Oldenburg International Film Festival - Nomination for the German Independence Award - Best German Film for Franz Müller
- 2009: Oldenburg International Film Festival - Nomination for the German Independence Award - Audience Award for Franz Müller
- 2010: Crossing Europe - Nomination for the Crossing Europe Award – Best Fiction Film for Franz Müller
- 2010: Schwerin Art of Film Festival - Prize Flying Ox in the category Best feature for Franz Müller
- 2011: German Film Critics Association Awards - Nomination for the German Film Critics Association Award in the category Best Music for Tobias Ellenberg, Daniel Backes and Jennifer Jones

== Sequel ==
Wallace Line is supposed to be the first part of a “long-term trilogy”. The sequel is to be called “Das Glück der Tüchtigen” (“The luck of the brave”), in which the teenager Mira now plays the leading role as an adult and has to fight for her marriage and existence. Other actors from “Wallace Line” will also be involved.
