= Tuesday, After Christmas =

- Directed by: Radu Muntean
- Written by: Alexandru Baciu; Radu Muntean; Răzvan Rădulescu
- Starring: Dragoș Bucur; Maria Popistașu; Victor Rebengiuc; Mimi Brănescu
- Cinematography: Tudor Lucaciu
- Edited by: Andu Radu
- Production company: Multimedia Est
- Release date: 13 May 2010 (Cannes Film Festival)
- Running time: 99 minutes
- Country: Romania
- Language: Romanian

Tuesday, After Christmas (Romanian: Marți, după Crăciun) is a 2010 Romanian film written and directed by Radu Muntean. The film was selected for the Un Certain Regard section of 2010 Cannes Film Festival.

== Plot ==
Paul, a banker in Bucharest, has been married for ten years to Adriana and they have an adored daughter Mara. The child has tooth problems which are being tended by Raluca, an attractive young orthodontist. Since first seeing her in the summer, Paul has been having a secret affair with Raluca. But, as Christmas approaches, tensions mount. While Paul loves both women, Raluca tells him what he already knows: that he must choose. When he says to his wife that he is in love with Raluca, she orders him to move out and to say nothing to Mara. The round of Christmas festivities then begins, with the couple pretending outwardly that nothing is wrong. Action is postponed until the Tuesday after Christmas.

== Cast ==
- Maria Popistașu as Raluca
- Mimi Brănescu as Paul Hanganu
- Mirela Oprișor as Adriana Hanganu
- Dragoș Bucur as Cristi
- Victor Rebengiuc as Nucu

== Reception ==
=== Awards and nominations ===
Leeds International Film Festival

- Won: Golden Owl Award

== See also ==
- Romanian New Wave
