= The Fixer (2016 film) =

2016 film

- Theatrical release poster
- Directed by: Adrian Sitaru
- Written by: Adrian Silisteanu; Claudia Silisteanu
- Produced by: Anamaria Antoci; Adrian Silisteanu
- Starring: Sorin Cocis
- Cinematography: Adrian Silisteanu
- Edited by: Mircea Olteanu
- Release dates: 16 April 2016 (Tribeca); 27 January 2017 (Romania)
- Running time: 100 minutes
- Countries: Romania; France
- Language: Romanian
- Box office: $9,669

The Fixer (Romanian: Fixeur) is a 2016 Romanian-French drama film directed by Adrian Sitaru. It was screened in the Contemporary World Cinema section at the 2016 Toronto International Film Festival. It was selected as the Romanian entry for the Best Foreign Language Film at the 90th Academy Awards, but it was not nominated.

== Plot ==
A young reporter pursues the story of an underage prostitute under shock who is back from Paris in Transylvania. Though first driven by his ambition, he begins to question the moral boundaries of journalism.

== Cast ==
- Sorin Cocis
- Tudor Istodor as Radu- Fixeur
- Mehdi Nebbou as Axel
- Diana Spatarescu as Anca
- Adrian Titieni
- Andreea Vasile
- Nicolas Wanczycki as Serge

== See also ==
- List of submissions to the 90th Academy Awards for Best Foreign Language Film
- List of Romanian submissions for the Academy Award for Best Foreign Language Film
