= Tudor Istodor =

Romanian actor

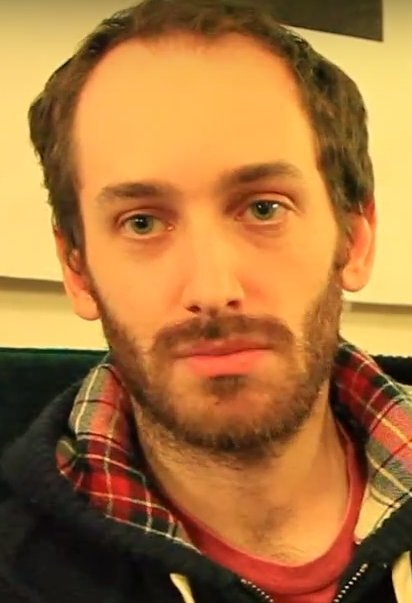
- Istodor in 2013
- Born: Tudor Aaron Istodor; 24 May 1984 (age 42); București, România
- Occupation: Actor
- Parents: Claudiu Istodor (father); Maia Morgenstern (mother)

Tudor Aaron Istodor (born 24 May 1984) is a Romanian actor. He played Dinu Caragea in the Romanian police drama Băieți buni.

Istodor is the son of Romanian actors Claudiu Istodor and Maia Morgenstern. He mostly focuses his career by performing theatre.

== Filmography ==
Tudor Istodor starred different characters in movies, short films or TV series.

- The Site (2025)
- The Fixer (2016)
- Cadences obstinées (2014)
- Miss Christina (2013)
- A Month in Thailand (2012)

Luna verde – 2010
Cendres et sang / Cenuşă şi sânge – 2009

- Weekend with my Mother – 2009

Târziu – 2008 (short)
Blood and Chocolate / Pasiune şi destin (2007)
Bricostory – 2007 (short)
Interior. Scară de bloc (2007)
Radu+Ana – 2007 (short)
Sinopsis docu-dramă – 2007 (short)
Tarziu – 2007 (short)
Cu inima indoita – 2006 (TV movie)
Examen – 2006 (short)

- The Paper Will Be Blue – 2006

Lombarzilor 8 -2006 (TV series)
Tertium non datur – 2006 (short)
Băieți buni – 2005 (TV series)
