= Florin Bogardo =

Romanian composer and singer (1942–2009)

- Born: 16 August 1942; Bucharest, Romania
- Died: 15 August 2009 (aged 66); Bucharest, Romania
- Occupations: Composer and singer
- Spouse: Stela Enache (m. 1971–2009)

Florin Amedeo Bogardo (Romanian pronunciation: [floˈrin ameˈdeo boˈɡardo]; 16 August 1942 – 15 August 2009) was a Romanian composer and singer. He died after a long illness at the age of 67. Bogardo was the husband of Stela Enache, also a singer.

== Creations ==
- Tu, aprinsă stea
- Iarna
- Cîndva o luntre albă
- Ani de liceu
- Definiþie
- Apari, iubire
- Taci!
- Despre lucruri
- N-ai să mă poți uita
- Balada pescăruşilor albaștri
- Rugăciune
- Ora cântecului
- De n-ar fi cărările
- E o poveste de amor
- Cândva arborii aveau ochi
- De câte ori ești lângă mine
- Cum e oare?
- Mă uit la tine, toamnă
- Plop înfrînt
- Iubirea cea mare
- Ce simți când ești îndrăgostit
- Ceramica
- Vorbe banale
- Variațiuni pe o romanță veche
- Izvorul nopții
- Să nu uităm trandafirii
- Întrebare
- Un vis romantic
- Apa vieții
- Într-o zi cînd m-am născut
- Tu ești primăvara mea
- Luna pămînteană
- Absența
- Apleacă-te lin
- Adevărul despre alchimie
- Un fluture și o pasăre
- Iertarea
- Dacă iubeşti fără să speri
- Dintre sute de catarge
- Tablouri
- Un acoperiș
- La steaua
- Vino-n codru la izvor
- Un om, o viaţă
- Orice om
- Strofe de-a lungul anilor
- O floare albă
- Obstacolul invizibil
- Să pot
- Eminescu, ţie!
- Trandafirul
- În numele iubirii
- Ca un tren ne pare viața
- Frumoaso cu ochi limpezi
- Cum plouă azi peste iubirea noastră
- Primul vals
- Dorul, flacără nebună
- Dimineţile mele
- Nicăieri
- (Tema din filmul) Raliul
- Un cîntec pentru ţara mea
- Iubirea mea, pămîntul stramoșesc
- Onor soarelui
- O, te-am iubit!
- Ca tine nu e nimeni
- Flori de cîmp
- Ca o chemare
- Miracolul iubirii
- Vraja sărutului
- Să compun o balada
- Cînd amintirile..
- Ochiul tău iubit
- Ceas de taină
- E primăvara profesor
- Fără lună, fără stele
