= Mircea Stănescu =

Romanian politician (1969–2009)

Mircea Stănescu (July 17, 1969 – January 5, 2009) was a Romanian Member of Parliament (2004–2008).

Born in Bucharest, he was the son of Romanian journalist Sorin Roșca Stănescu. On December 27, 2008, he committed a car accident which resulted in the death of a pedestrian who was lawfully crossing Alexandru Șerbănescu Street in Bucharest.

On January 5, 2009 Stănescu was found dead at his home in Bucharest, after an apparent suicide by gunshot.
