= Adrian Titieni =

Romanian actor

Adrian Titieni Medal for Education in Romania
- Born: 6 June 1963 (age 63); Bistrița, Romania
- Occupation: Actor
- Years active: 1985–present

Adrian Titieni (Romanian pronunciation: [adriˈan titiˈeni]; born 6 June 1963) is a Romanian actor. He has appeared in more than fifty films since 1985.

== Selected filmography ==
| Year | Title | Role | Notes |
|---|---|---|---|
| 2008 | Hooked | | |
| 2012 | Domestic | | |
| 2012 | Chasing Rainbows | | |
| 2013 | Child's Pose | | |
| 2015 | Bucharest Non Stop | | |
| 2016 | Graduation | | |
| 2016 | The Fixer | | |
| 2016 | Illegitimate | | |
| 2021 | The Father Who Moves Mountains | Mircea | |
