= Science Fiction (2003 film) =

2003 film directed by Franz Müller

- Film poster
- German: Science Fiction
- Directed by: Franz Müller
- Written by: Franz Müller
- Produced by: Franz Müller
- Starring: Arved Birnbaum, Jan Henrik Stahlberg
- Cinematography: Frederik Walker
- Edited by: Franz Müller, Dirk Oetelshoven, Sean Coffey and Barbara Hoffmann
- Music by: Tobias Ellenberg
- Release dates: February 10, 2003 (Berlin International Film Festival); March 4, 2004 (Germany)
- Running time: 112 minutes
- Country: Germany
- Language: German

Science Fiction (German: Kein Science Fiction or Science Fiction) is a 2003 German feature film directed by Franz Müller and starring Arved Birnbaum, Jan Henrik Stahlberg and Nicole Marischka. On February 10, 2003, the film premiered at the 53rd Berlin International Film Festival in the Perspektive Deutsches Kino section. Science Fiction was released in German cinemas on March 4, 2004.

== Synopsis ==
The motivational trainer Marius leads a management course in Cologne. Jörg, a shy man from Brandenburg, is also part of the small group of participants. He hopes to use the knowledge he has acquired to save his ailing company. The course content also includes job application training. Marius wants to show Jörg in the corridor of the seminar building how to enter a room confidently in an application situation. When he opens the door to the seminar room, there is suddenly another group of participants behind it, who are drawing a nude.

Marius and Jörg realize that they are in a kind of parallel world. They are still in Cologne, but all the people they knew have disappeared. A completely different family lives in Jörg's house. And there is another peculiarity: Marius and Jörg can communicate with other people as usual, but when a door closes behind them, no one can remember them.

At first, the two try to make the best of the situation: Marius even takes advantage of the situation and dresses himself and Jörg in new clothes in a posh clothing store. When they pretend to want to look at the fabric in daylight, the sales clerk can no longer remember them and they leave the store without paying. The two of them put up in a hotel and can stay there free of charge in their parallel world: The next day, no one knows that they have stayed there and they check in again. But over time, they realize that life in the parallel world also has considerable disadvantages. If they have met a woman and she only goes to the toilet once in a bar, for example, she will not recognize them when they return. The same applies to the receptionist Anja, who works in the hotel where the two of them are staying. Both men fall in love with the young woman and get to know her better and better over the next few days. They take advantage of the fact that Anja has forgotten everything the next day and gets to know them anew every day when they arrive at the hotel. Marius has a better chance of getting to know Anja because of his open nature, but he also fails because of the effects of the parallel world.

One day, all three of them are celebrating in a bar. They spontaneously decide to drive to the seaside. Marius makes his car available and they spend an exuberant night there. The next day, they realize that the "spell" has been broken and that third parties remember Jörg and Marius, even though a door closes behind them. However, Jörg also has to realize that Anja has chosen Marius. He therefore decides to return to his home in Forst in Lusatia, Germany.

== Cast ==
- Arved Birnbaum as Jörg
- Jan Henrik Stahlberg as Marius
- Nicole Marischka as Anja
- Heidi Ecks as Anja's sister Barbara
- Thomas Wittmann as Hotelier
- Sarah Meyer as Woman in the university #1
- Angela Menzel as Woman in the university #2
- Siegfried Antonio Effenberger as Man in advertising agency
- Nadja Becker as Receptionist advertising agency
- Christoph Kottenkamp as Guest in pub
- Bettina von Kolbeck as Woman in snack bar
- Kali Zmugg as Man in restaurant
- Mark Weigel as Fashion sales clerk
- Sybille Schedwill as Saleswoman in the music store
- Jost Meyer as Salesman in the music store
- Christiane Olivier as Waitress in pub
- Rainer Knepperges as Man in the terraced house
- Katrin Leuthe as Woman in the terraced house
- Silke Natho as Seminar participant
- Claudia Mischke as Seminar participant
- Klaus Ebert as the Seminar participant
- Edith Höltenschmidt as Toilet attendant
- Ingrid Kaltenegger as Policewoman
- Henning Grübl as Car salesman
- Dean Baykan as Roman from the pizzeria

== Production and background ==
The film was shot from 19. August to 18 September 2001. Filming took place in Cologne and on the beach at Westkapelle, Netherlands. Science Fiction was funded by the German Film- und Medienstiftung NRW and is also Müller's diploma project at the Academy of Media Arts Cologne. The dialog in the film is improvised and the story was largely developed together with the actors.

Müller's feature film was released in German cinemas on March 4, 2004, under the title Kein Science Fiction. The film had previously been shown at film festivals under the title Science Fiction. However, the producer of a children's film of the same name is said to have threatened Munich-based distributor Bernd Brehmer with a title dispute three days before the film was released and filed a lawsuit.

== Reception ==
=== Critical response ===
In addition to the German reviews, that the film received on its German theatrical release, Science Fiction was also reviewed by Ken Eisner of Variety. Eisner writes, that it is hard to believe "this original and sharply observed comedy was a student project, but 'Science Fiction' is the graduating effort from Franz Muller, of Cologne's Academy of Media Arts, and it shows him more than ready for the real world." Furthermore, he praises in his critique: "A satire of human relations — with the title mostly tongue-in-cheek, pic carries both teeth and heart. Three-hander, which won a Babelsburg Media Award, is a perfectly acted treat that will fit any fest format, and some commercial life is not beyond belief. A remake seems possible, but it's hard to imagine Hollywood having such a light touch."

=== Accolades (selection) ===
- 2003: FILMZ – Festival des deutschen Kino - Special Prize for Franz Müller
