= Chasing Rainbows: The Road to Oz =

- Book: Marc Acito
- Premiere: December 2, 2015: Flat Rock Playhouse, Flat Rock, Henderson County, North Carolina
- Productions: 2019 Paper Mill Playhouse

Chasing Rainbows: The Road to Oz is a musical with a book by Marc Acito, based on the life of Judy Garland.

== Premise ==
Conceived by Tina Marie Casamento, with musical adaption and arrangements by David Libby the musical follows Judy Garland's early career from vaudeville baby to MGM teen star.

== Productions ==
The musical premiered at the Flat Rock Playhouse on December 2, 2015 and ran for a limited time through December 19, 2015.

Following a series of workshops and industry labs, it was announced in March 2019 that the show would have its world premiere at the Paper Mill Playhouse. Previews for Chasing Rainbows began on September 26, 2019 at the Paper Mill Playhouse. The world premiere of Chasing Rainbows opened the following month on October 6. The limited run closed on October 27, 2019. Following the Paper Mill Playhouse production, the producers planned to continue workshopping the musical.

== Musical numbers ==
Paper Mill Playhouse

Act 1

- "Shooting High" – Gumm Family
- "Going Hollywood" – Gumm Family & Ensemble
- "Always/Remember" – Frank, Baby & Frances
- "Morning Comes" – Frances
- "This Is a Happy Little Ditty" – Shirley & Students
- "All Ma’s Children" – Joe, Harold, Shirley, Frances, Students & Ma Lawlor
- "Beautiful Girls" – Ethel, Mary Jane, Virginia & Frances
- "Bill" – Frances & Ethel
- "You Made Me Love You" – Ethel & Frank
- "Shooting High (Reprise) " – Joe
- "When You’re Smiling" – Frank & Baby
- "The Business We Call Show" – Virginia, Mary Jane, Frances & Ethel
- "Judy" – George Jessel & Judy
- "I’m Always Chasing Rainbows" – Judy & Frank
- "Hollywood Party/Should I” – Mickey, Judy, Ethel, Frank & Ensemble
- "Il Bacio" – Edna Mae
- "Zing! Went the Strings of My Heart" – Judy
- "Beautiful Girls” (Reprise)" – Mayer, Roger & Kay
- "Everybody Sing" – Judy, Gumm Family & Company

Act 2

- "Optimistic Voices" – Judy & Ensemble
- "Meet the Beat of My Heart/Broadway Rhythm" – Judy, Kay, Buddy & Ensemble
- "Roger’s Coaching" – Roger & Judy
- "I Can’t Give You Anything but Love/Teenage Patter" – Judy & Frank
- "Zing! Went the Strings of My Heart (Reprise)" – Judy
- "Always/Remember (Reprise)" – Ethel, Mary Jane, Virginia & Judy
- "In-Between" – Judy & Roger
- "Swing, Mister Mendelssohn" – Edna Mae, Mickey & Judy
- "Dear Mister Gable/You Made Me Love You" – Judy, Mayer & Kay
- "If/Only" – Kay
- "I’m Always Chasing Rainbows (Reprise)" – Judy & Frank
- "Got a Pair of New Shoes" – Kay, Roger, Mickey, Judy & Ensemble
- "Oz Montage" – Company
- "Over the Rainbow" – Judy

== Cast and characters ==
Character	Flat Rock Playhouse (2015)	Goodspeed Musicals (2016)	Industry Reading (2017)	Industry Workshop (2019)	Paper Mill Playhouse (2019)
Frances Gumm / Judy Garland	Ruby Rakos	Ruby Rakos	Ruby Rakos	Ruby Rakos	Ruby Rakos
Joe Yule / Mickey Rooney	Michael Wartella	Michael Wartella	Michael Wartella	Andrew Keenan-Bolger	Michael Wartella
Frank Gumm	Ben Crawford	Kevin Earley	Max von Essen	Daniel Reichard	Max von Essen
Louis B. Mayer	Kevin B. McGlynn	Michael McCormick	Michael McCormick	Michael McCormick	Stephen DeRosa
Roger Edens	Michael McCorry Rose	Gary Milner	Jason Danieley	Colin Hanlon	Colin Hanlon
Ethel Gumm	Wendy Bergamini	Sally Wilfert	Sally Wilfert	Sally Wilfert	Lesli Margherita
Ma Lawlor / Kay Koverman	Janet Dickinson	Karen Mason	Karen Mason	Karen Mason	Karen Mason
Baby Frances Gumm	Kyra Hewitt	Ella Briggs	Sophie Knapp	Sophie Knapp	Sophie Knapp
Shirley Temple	Nicole Johanson	Lea Mancarella	Violet Tinnirello	Violet Tinnirello	Violet Tinnirello
George Jessel	Michael McCorry Rose	Gary Milner	Kevin B. McGlynn	Kevin B. McGlynn	Kevin B. McGlynn
Mary Jane Gumm	Katie Drinkard	Lucy Horton	Samantha Joy Pearlman	Samantha Joy Pearlman	Samantha Joy Pearlman
Young Mary Jane Gumm	Katie LaMark	—	—	—	Alluson O’Malley
Virginia Gumm	Andrea Laxton	Andrea Laxton	Tessa Grady	—	Tessa Grady
Young Virginia Gumm	—	Piper Birney	Lea Mancarella	—	Molly Lyons
Deanna Durbin	Clare Griffin	Clare Griffin	Christina Maxwell	Christina Maxwell	Christina Maxwell
Clark Gable	Zachary Berger	—	—	John Battagliese	Sean Thompson
Lana Turner	Maddy Kinsella	Berklea Going	—	—	Clara Cox
Jean Harlow	Alexandria Van Paris	—	—	—	Kimberly Immanuel
Buddy Ebsen	Davis Wayne	—	—	—	Drew Redington
Gale Sondergaard	—	—	Mackenzie Bell	Mackenzie Bell	Mackenzie Bell
Bill Gilmore	Scott Treadway	Jesse Sharp	—	Jesse Sharp	Joe Cassidy
