= Ovidiu Mușetescu =

Romanian politician

Ovidiu Muşetescu (born Bucharest, September 15, 1955 - died there, October 18, 2009) was a Romanian politician. He was a member of the Social Democratic Party and died of cancer.
