= Paul Negoescu =

Romanian film director (born 1984)

- Negoescu in 2017
- Born: 1984 (age 41–42); Bucharest, Romania
- Occupation: Film director
- Children: 1

Paul Negoescu (born 1984) is a Romanian filmmaker best known for the comedy films A Month in Thailand and Two Lottery Tickets.

== Career ==
Negoescu studied film directing at I. L. Caragiale National University of Theatre and Film, graduating in 2007. He released a string of short films throughout the late 2000s and early 2010s. His 2012 feature film debut, A Month in Thailand, premiered at in the International Critics' Week section of that year's Venice International Film Festival.

Negoescu's comedy film Two Lottery Tickets, based on a Ion Luca Caragiale short story, debuted at the 2016 Transylvania International Film Festival. The film went on to be the highest-grossing Romanian film of that year. His 2018 romantic comedy The Story of a Summer Lover also premiered in Transylvania, and his 2018 dark comedy Men of Deeds debuted at the Sarajevo Film Festival.

Another Lottery Ticket, the sequel to Two Lottery Tickets, was released in 2023. Negoescu's family comedy Atlas of the Universe premiered at the Berlin International Film Festival in 2026.

== Personal life ==
Negoescu has one daughter, who appeared in a small role in Atlas of the Universe.

== Filmography ==
Year	English Title	Original Title	Notes	Ref.
2006	Examen		Short film	
2007	Home	Acasa	Short film	
2007	Radu + Ana		Short film	
2008	Late	Târziu	Short film	
2008	A Short Ride	Scurta plimbare cu masina	Short film	
2009	Renovation	Renovare	Short film	
2010	Derby		Short film	
2012	Horizon	Orizont	Short film	
2012	A Month in Thailand	O luna in Thailanda		
2016	Two Lottery Tickets	Doua lozuri		
2018	The Story of a Summer Lover	Povestea unui pierde-vara		
2022	Men of Deeds	Oameni de treaba		
2023	Another Lottery Ticket	Inca doua lozuri		
2026	Atlas of the Universe	Atlasul Universului		
