= Dragoș Bucur =

Romanian actor

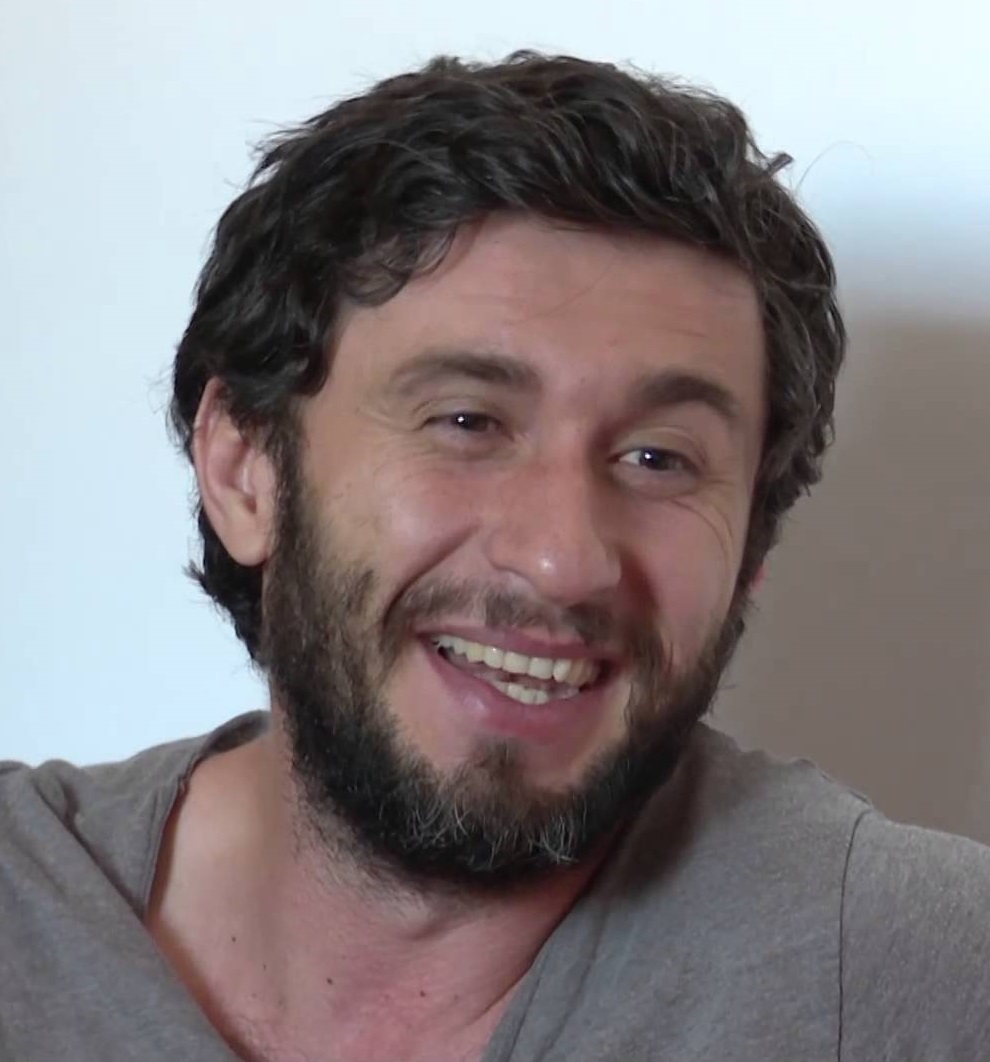
- Born: 13 June 1977 (age 49); Bucharest, Romania
- Occupations: Actor, TV personality
- Writing career
- Years active: 1998–present

Dragoș Bucur (Romanian pronunciation: [ˈdraɡoʃ ˈbukur]; born 13 June 1977) is a Romanian actor, ambassador for the program Youth of the Move involved by the European Commission, and TV presenter for the show Visuri la cheie broadcast on Pro TV.

Dragoș Bucur received the Shooting Stars Award, the annual acting award for up-and-coming actors by European Film Promotion, at the Berlin International Film Festival 2010.

He holds an acting degree from Caragiale Academy of Theatrical Arts and Cinematography in Bucharest, Romania. He became known through his roles in Police, Adjective (praised by The Washington Post); The Way Back, and Boogie. Of the latter, The Guardian notes about Dragoș character: "Dragoș plays Bogdan or 'Boogie', a hardworking guy who has been prevailed upon to take his partner Smaranda (Anamaria Marinca) and their child to the seaside." Also he stars in The Paper Will Be Blue and many more productions.

Apart from being an actor he has also hosted several Romanian TV shows like Jurnal de călătorie, Visuri la cheie, Faci Pariu?, Marfă, Câștigi fără să știi, etc.

== Awards and honours ==
For his acting talent he has received many awards in the recent years. In 2002 and 2009 he won the UCIN award for Best Actor for the films The Rage and Boogie, while in 2009 and 2010 he won the GOPO award for Best Actor again for Boogie and Police, he also received the Actor Award at Buenos Aires Intl. Festival of Independent Film (BAFICI) writes Variety.

He currently resides in Bucharest, Romania, together with his wife, Romanian singer Dana Nălbaru and their daughter Sofia, who was born in 2007. In March 2010, Dragos Bucur, Dorian Boguţă and Alexandru Papadopol founded Actoriedefilm.ro - acting school and production company.

== Filmography ==
=== Film ===
Year	Title	Role	Notes
1998	Next Stop Paradise		Original title: Terminus paradis
2001	Stuff and Dough	Vali	Original title: Marfa și banii
2001	Popcorn Story		Short film
2002	The Rage	Luca	Original title: Furia
2002	Telephone Number Temporarily Suspended		Short film; Original title: Post Telefonic Suspendat Temporar
2003	The Tank	The Defender Policeman	Original title: Tancul
2004	My Name Is Modesty	Janos	
2004	Liviu's Dream		Short film; Original title: Visul lui Liviu
2004	Out of Season	Clown	
2005	Crash Test Dummies	Romanian Man	
2005	The Death of Mr. Lazarescu	Mișu	Original title: Moartea domnului Lăzărescu
2006	The Paper Will Be Blue	Dragoş	Original title: Hârtia va fi albastră
2007	Water	Lieutenant Iordan	Short film; Original title: Apă
2007	After It	Stefan	Original title: După ea
2007	Youth Without Youth	Bartender	
2008	Boogie	Bogdan Ciocăzanu	
2008	Con Time	Călin Boboc	TV film; Original title: Contra timp
2009	Police, Adjective	Cristi	Original title: Polițist, Adjectiv
2009	The Other Irene		Original title: Cealaltă Irina
2009	Con Time 2: No Escape	Călin Boboc	TV film; Original title: Contra timp 2
2010	WebSiteStory	Seller at Non-Stop	
2010	Tuesday, After Christmas	Cristi	Original title: Marți, după Crăciun
2010	The Way Back	Zoran	
2011	The Godmother	Radu Prodan	Original title: Nașa
2012	Süskind	German Guard	
2012	The Fourth State	Shamil	Original title: Die vierte Macht
2012	Chasing Rainbows	Computer Instructor	Original title: Și caii sunt verzi pe pereți
2012	Therapeutic Dialogues	Cristi	Short film; Original title: Dialoguri terapeutice
2012	Ho Ho Ho 2: A Family Lottery	Vlad	Original title: Ho Ho Ho 2: O loterie de familie
2013	Love Building	Silviu Soare	
2013	Luminiţa	Gabriel	Short film
2013	Dreamland	Cousin	Original title: Traumland
2014	Ride Along	Marko	
2014	Mirage	Kokas	Original title: Délibáb
2014	The Nostalgic Mechanics of Events	Agency Director	Short film; Original title: Mecanica nostalgicã a întâmplãrilor
2014	Alt Love Building	Silviu Soare	
2014	Monica is Back		Short film; Original title: Monica se întoarce
2015	Love Is a Story	Sebastien	
2016	Dogs	Roman	Original title: Câini
2016	Two Lottery Tickets	Vasile Gramada	Original title: Două lozuri
2016	Manhunt: Escape to the Carpathians	Liviu Caramitru	TV film; Original title: Zielfahnder: Flucht in die Karpaten
2017	Hawaii	Andrei Florescu	
2018	Doing Money	Ionut Ilie	TV film
2019	Bloody Marie	Dragomir	
2019	Legacy	Radu	Original title: Urma
2025	Fuze	Ludo	

=== Television ===
Year	Title	Role	Notes
2005	Good Guys	Inspector Călin Boboc	Series regular; Original title: Băieți buni
2012	Titanic	Peter Lubov	TV mini-series; 4 episodes
2012	Wallander	Sergei Upitis	Episode: "The Dogs of Riga"
2012	The Fear	Marin	TV mini-series; 4 episodes
2014	The Missing	Martin	Episode: "Molly"
2016	Stan Lee's Lucky Man	Viktor Mirchev	Episode: "Win Some, Lose Some"
2022–2025	Românii au talent	Himself (Judge)	
