= Thea Segall =

Romanian-Venezuelan photographer (1929–2009)

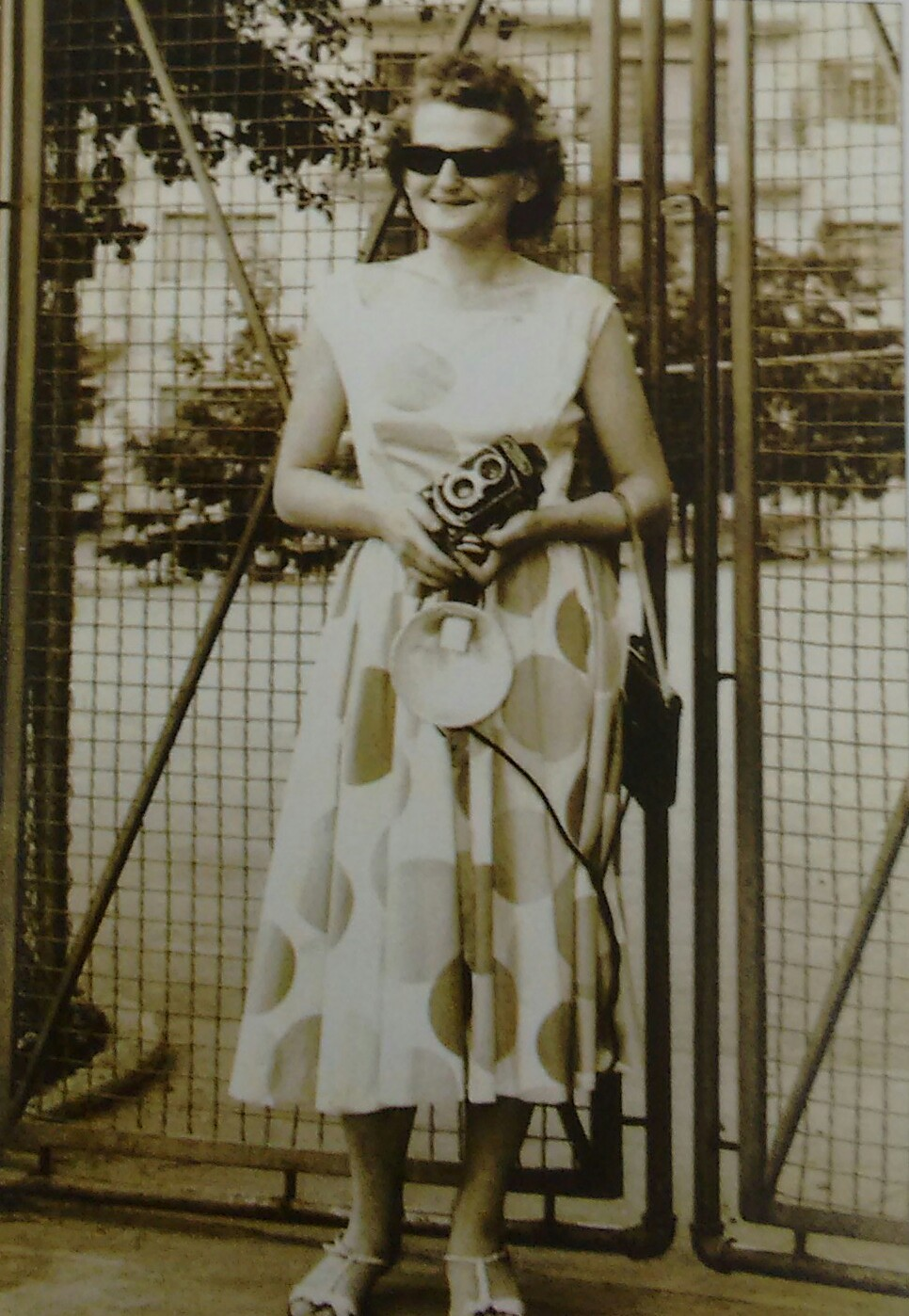
- Thea Segall, ca 1956 (in Romania)
- Born: 13 May 1929; Burdujeni, Suceava County, Romania
- Died: 25 October 2009 (aged 80); Caracas, Venezuela
- Citizenship: Venezuelan
- Occupation: Photographer
- Awards: National Photography Award of Venezuela (2003)

Thea Segall Rubin (13 May 1929 – 25 October 2009) was a Romanian-born photographer of Jewish descent who lived in Venezuela from 1958 until her death. She was the winner of the 2003 National Photography Award of Venezuela, editor of numerous publications and manager of her own photographic studio. Through her photographic work she covered aspects such as ethnographic registry, rural culture, religious architecture, portraits and institutional photography.

== Education ==
Segall had two sisters, Mioara and Natașa. Her parents were Andrés Segall and Golda Rubin. From 1936 and 1947 she received her primary education, entering the Notre Dame de Sion school of nuns at the age of ten and then moving to a private French school where she ended her education. She lived through difficult moments during World War II, and her life was restricted between Burdujeni and Bucharest. At the end of this stage she aspired to study architecture, but at that time the students had to wait for a long time to enter university. When she was finally admitted for the School of Architecture she was already a photographer. In 1947 Segall started self-education in photographic theory to teach and take a course at the Photography Center of the School of Journalism with Austrian photographer and teacher Otto Grossar (he had arrived in Bucharest in 1939, where he opened a successful studio), with whom she later worked as his assistant.

== Career ==
=== Romania ===
The same year her parents migrated to Israel with her younger sister Natașa. Between 1948 and 1957, she served as a photojournalist for the Romanian International News Agency Agerpres, founded by Grossar, in Bucharest.

=== Emigration ===
In 1957 she abandoned Bucharest with her sister Mioara due to the situation of the communist regime, traveling without passport with health problems to Denmark and later to Paris.

In 1958 she arrived in Venezuela with a passport of the Red Cross during the government junta presided over by Wolfgang Larrazábal, shortly after the dictatorship of Marcos Pérez Jiménez. From 1958 to 1960 she worked for the Creole Petroleum Corporation and published her pictures in El Farol magazine. She understood authorial and research work, both social and photographic, in fishing areas of the Anzoátegui State coasts. In 1959 she opened the Thea Photographic Studio in Sabana Grande, Caracas, which operated until 1994. In 1964 she was naturalised as Venezuelan with the help of General Briceño. In 1974 she participated as a Venezuelan delegate at the first Ibero-American Congress of Scientific Journalism in Caracas, and in 1977 she participated as Venezuelan delegate in the second Ibero-American Congress of Scientific Journalism.
