= Two Lottery Tickets =

- Două lozuri
- Directed by: Paul Negoescu
- Screenplay by: Paul Negoescu
- Based on: Două loturi by Ion Luca Caragiale
- Produced by: Dragoș Bucur Dorian Boguță Alexandru Papadopol
- Starring: Dragoș Bucur; Dorian Boguță; Alexandru Papadopol
- Edited by: Alexandru Radu
- Music by: Flora Pop
- Distributed by: RoImage 2000
- Release date: 7 October 2016
- Running time: 86 minutes
- Country: Romania
- Language: Romanian
- Budget: €50,000

Two Lottery Tickets (Romanian: Două lozuri) is a 2016 Romanian comedy film directed by Paul Negoescu and loosely based on Waking Ned. It is a story of a working man losing his lottery ticket that was for a huge prize goes through bizarre events and takes another ticket and wins it. The name of the film is based on Ion Luca Caragiale's short story Două loturi.

== Plot ==
Dinel is an auto-mechanic who is struggling and has marital problems. Sile is a carpenter and a gambler, habitually betting anything. Pompiliu is a government employee and a conspiracy theorist. The trio are friends and hearing Dinel's troubles they decide to try their luck at the lottery. They win the lottery, but Dinel, who kept the ticket, realizes he lost it when he was robbed by two thugs in front of his apartment. Pompiliu claims this is the Secret Service's doing, saying they give high price tickets to people as a retirement option that is without taxes. Sile doesn't believe it and urges Dinel to report the loss to the police. After having his palm read, Dinel comes to believe his wife is in a dire situation and requires his help—and for that he needs the money. Together, they start searching for the stolen golden ticket.

== Cast ==
- Dragoș Bucur as Sile
- Dorian Boguță as Dinel
- Alexandru Papadopol as Pompiliu

== Reception ==
The Hollywood Reporter said of the film, "Though Two Lottery Tickets’ budget must have been modest, there is no sense that compromises had to be made to tell the story currently onscreen. The standout technical credit, beyond the cinematography, is the guitar-driven score, which at times infuses the film with something of a country vibe."
