= Dorian Boguță =

Moldovan actor

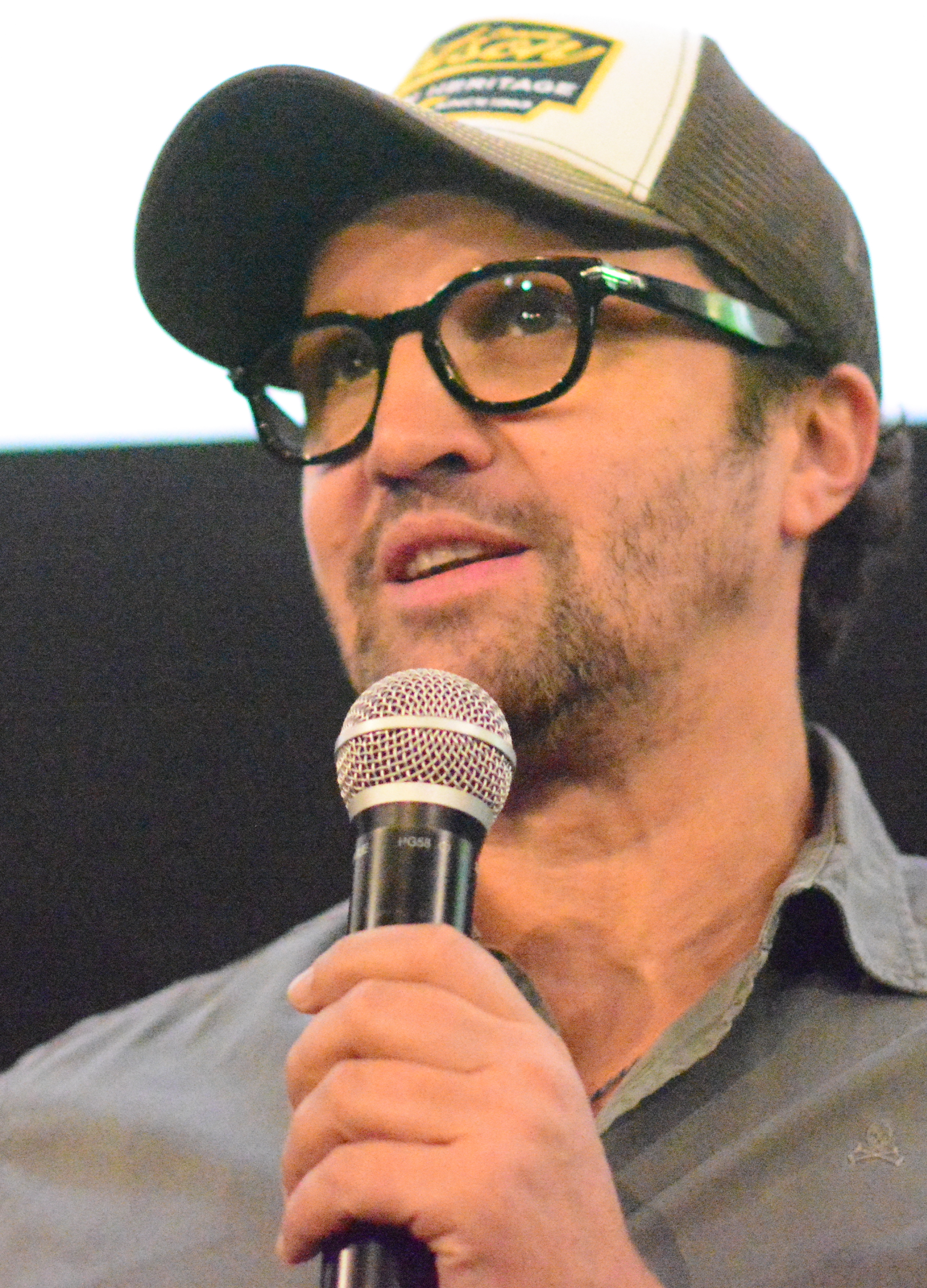
- Dorian Boguță, 2024
- Born: 24 April 1971 (age 55); Chișinău, Moldova
- Occupation: Actor
- Years active: 1984-present

Dorian Boguță (born 24 April 1971) is a Moldovan-born Romanian actor. He appeared in more than thirty films since 1984. In 2009, he made his directorial debut with the short film "10", marking the beginning of a series of successful short films, "De acum încolo" (2012), which won several awards including Best Romanian Short Film.

== Selected filmography ==
Year	Title	Role	Notes
2009	Francesca	Mita	
2013	Quod Erat Demonstrandum	Lucian Amohnoaiei	
2015	Bucharest Non Stop	Bodo	
2016	Two Lottery Tickets	Dinei	
2019	Zavera	Ștefan	
