= Chasing Rainbows (2012 film) =

2012 film

- Film poster
- Romanian: Si caii sunt verzi pe pereti
- Directed by: Dan Chisu
- Starring: Adrian Titieni; Ionut Visan
- Release date: 2 November 2012
- Running time: 104 minutes
- Country: Romania
- Language: Romanian

Chasing Rainbows (Romanian: Și caii sunt verzi pe pereți) is a 2012 Romanian comedy film directed by Dan Chisu.
