= Franz Müller (film director) =

German film director, screenwriter and producer (born 1965)

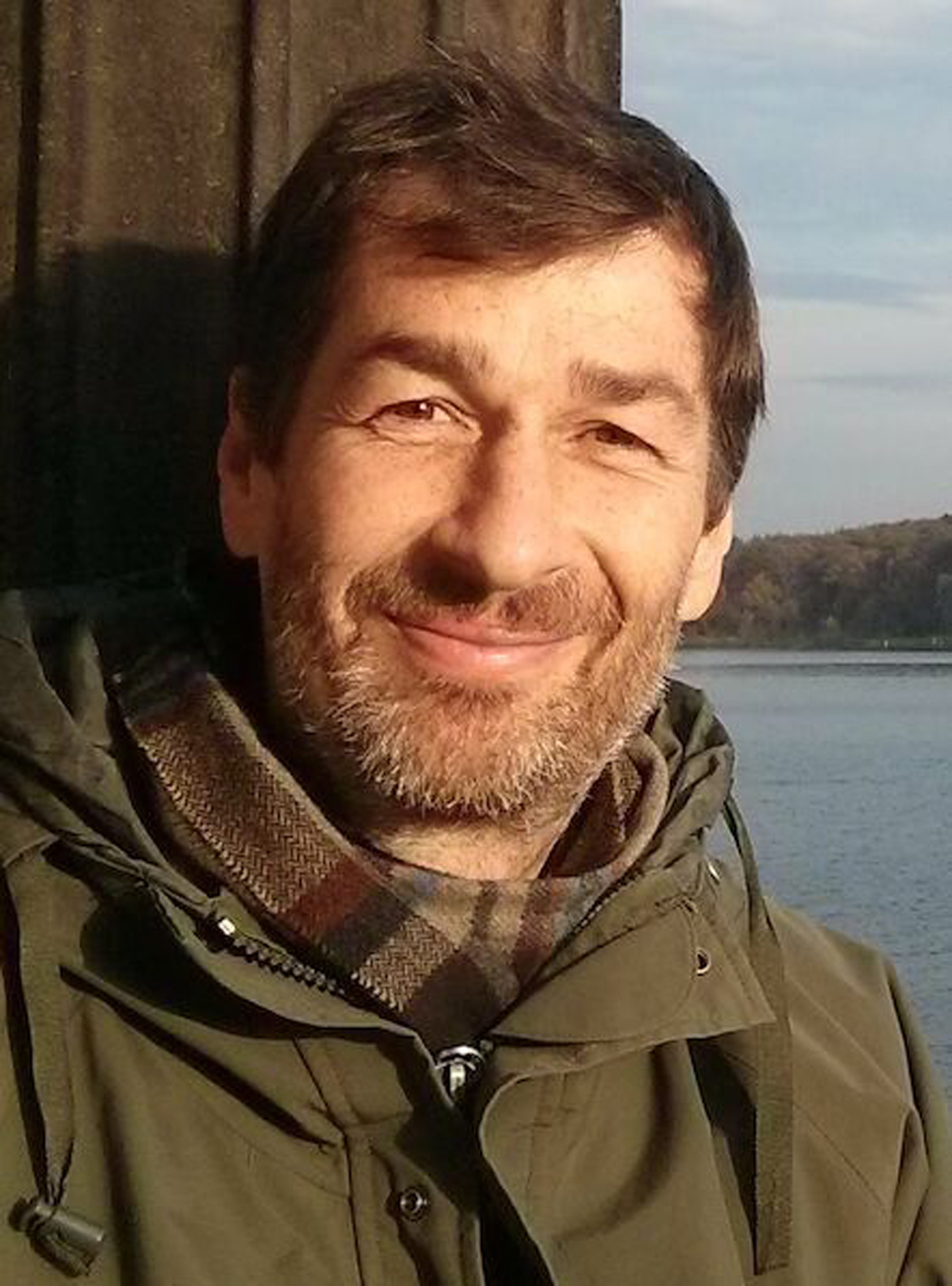
- Born: 20 October 1965 (age 60); Mosbach, Germany
- Occupations: Film director, screenwriter and producer

Franz Müller (born 20 October 1965 in Mosbach) is a German film director, screenwriter and producer.

== Life and work ==
Müller first studied early history and prehistory, then fine arts under Gerhard Richter and cybernetics at the Düsseldorf Art Academy until 1995. From 1999 Müller completed a post-graduate course at the Academy of Media Arts Cologne under Michael Lentz and Wolfgang Becker.

After his first realized short films in the 1990s, Müller directed the episode "Vater und Sohn" for the anthology film Freitagnacht (2001), which received the Gold award in the German competition at the Filmschoolfest Munich in 2002. He completed his studies at the Academy of Media Arts Cologne with his first feature film, the satirical Science Fiction (later titled Kein Science Fiction), for which he was awarded the prize for the best graduate film at the Babelsberg Media Awards in Potsdam in 2002. Science Fiction celebrated its world premiere in 2003 at the Berlin International Film Festival.

Müller's second feature film Wallace Line (Die Liebe der Kinder) (2009) was released in German cinemas in 2010. The story about a seemingly perfect patchwork family that gets out of balance won awards at the Schwerin Art of Film Festival and Biberach Film Festival (Biberacher Filmtage).

His next feature film Worst Case Scenario premiered at the 2014 Munich International Film Festival. It tells the story of a former couple whose attempt to shoot a comedy about the European Football Championship in Poland threatens to descend into chaos. In 2015 Müller's feature film Happy Hour also celebrated its premiere at the Munich International Film Festival. The comedy about three old school friends whose vacation together in Ireland does not go as smoothly as planned was awarded a New German Cinema Award in the Production category at the Munich International Film Festival. Happy Hour was released in German cinemas in spring 2016. In the same year, Müller founded the film production company Mizzi Stock Entertainment in Berlin together with Eva-Maria Weerts and has been working as a film producer ever since. His company co-produced the documentaries Notturno and Alice Schwarzer, among others.

In 2023, the movie adaptation of The Diaries of Adam and Eve (Die Tagebücher von Adam und Eva), based on the Mark Twain book of the same name, premiered at the Munich International Film Festival under Müller's direction.

In addition to his work as a director, screenwriter and producer, Müller has been involved in cinema programming at Filmclub 813 in Cologne since 1999. At the movie theater Kino 813 in der BRÜCKE in Cologne, he brought out the first complete retrospective of all of John Cassavetes' directorial works. He also wrote for various film magazines. To this day, he is one of the editors of the German film magazine Revolver. He has been a professor of screenwriting at the Academy of Media Arts Cologne since 2023.

Müller lives and works in Berlin and Cologne.

== Reception ==
In an issue of the German film magazine Filmdienst, German film critic Esther Buss focuses on Müller's feature films and sees him as an "exceptional phenomenon in the local cinema landscape". His films live from "contradictions" and refuse "any appropriation." The German film critic Ekkehard Knörer sees him as part of the Berlin School, but remarks in an interview with Müller for the German film magazine Cargo: "Franz Müller relates to the Berlin School a little like Luc Moullet to the Nouvelle Vague. He belongs to it, but he's too funny and free for any kind of loyalty to the line."

== Filmography (selection) ==
=== Director / screenwriter ===
- 2003: Science Fiction (feature film), (director, screenwriter)
- 2009: Wallace Line (Die Liebe der Kinder) (feature film), (director, screenwriter)
- 2010: 24h Marrakech (anthology film), (director and screenwriter on the episode "Ordinary Seamen")
- 2012: Leichtmatrosen II (short film), (director, screenwriter)
- 2014: Worst Case Scenario (feature film), (director, screenwriter)
- 2015: Happy Hour (feature film), (director, screenwriter)
- 2023: The Diaries of Adam and Eve (Die Tagebücher von Adam und Eva), (feature film), (director, screenwriter)
- 2025: All That's Due (Das Glück der Tüchtigen), (feature film), (director, screenwriter)

=== Producer ===
- 2003: Science Fiction (feature film)
- 2012: Leichtmatrosen II (short film)
- 2014: Worst Case Scenario (feature film)
- 2015: Happy Hour (feature film)
- 2020: Notturno (co-producer)
- 2022: Alice Schwarzer (documentary)
- 2023: The Diaries of Adam and Eve (Die Tagebücher von Adam und Eva), (feature film)
- 2025: All That's Due (Das Glück der Tüchtigen), (feature film)

=== Other ===
- 2003: Kein Science Fiction (editor)
- 2013: That's Poland (Das ist Polen), (short film), (actor)

== Awards (selection) ==
- 2009: Oldenburg International Film Festival – Nomination for the German Independence Award – Best German Film for Wallace Line
- 2009: Oldenburg International Film Festival – Nomination for the German Independence Award – Audience Award for Wallace Line
- 2010: Schwerin Art of Film Festival – Prize Flying Ox in the category Best feature for Wallace Line
- 2010: Crossing Europe – Nomination for the Crossing Europe Award – Best Fiction Film for Wallace Line
- 2013: Hamburg International Short Film Festival – Nomination for the Jury Award in the German Competition for Leichtmatrosen II
- 2014: Oldenburg International Film Festival – Nomination for the German Independence Award – Audience Award for Worst Case Scenario
- 2015: Tallinn Black Nights Film Festival – Nomination for the Grand Prize for Happy Hour
- 2023: Austrian Film Award – Nomination for the Austrian Film Award in the category Best Documentary (Bester Dokumentarfilm) for Alice Schwarzer
