= Radu Muntean =

Romanian film director and screenwriter (born 1971)

- Born: 8 June 1971 (age 55); Bucharest, Romania
- Education: Caragiale National University of Theatre and Film
- Occupations: Film director, screenwriter
- Years active: 1996–present
- Notable work: The Rage (2002); The Paper Will Be Blue (2006); Boogie (2008); Tuesday, After Christmas (2010); One Floor Below (2015); Întregalde (2021); Index (2025)
- Movement: Romanian New Wave

Radu Muntean (Romanian pronunciation: [ˈradu munˈte̯an]; born 8 June 1971) is a Romanian film director and screenwriter. He is a central figure of the Romanian New Wave.

He was born and grew up in central Bucharest. He studied at the Vasile Alecsandri School Nr. 118 (right next to the Saint Joseph Cathedral), and then at the nearby Saint Sava High School, graduating in 1989. After military service (cut short by the Romanian Revolution at the end of that year), he was admitted at the Theater and Film Academy, where he directed three short films, and graduated in 1994. Since 1996, he has directed over 400 commercials and has won over 40 national and international awards in various advertising festivals. His feature debut, The Rage, was awarded Best First Film by The Romanian Filmmakers Union, and Best Photography at the 2003 Transilvania International Film Festival. His second feature, The Paper Will Be Blue, as well as Boogie are representative of the Romanian New Wave.

His 2015 film One Floor Below was screened in the Un Certain Regard section at the 2015 Cannes Film Festival.

== Filmography ==
- The Rage (Furia) (2002)
- The Paper Will Be Blue (2006)
- Boogie (2008)
- Tuesday, After Christmas (2010)
- One Floor Below (2015)
- Alice T. (2018)
- Întregalde (2021)
- Index (2025), Premiered at the Locarno Later, it will compete at the 31st Sarajevo Film Festival in August.
