= One Floor Below =

2015 film

- Directed by: Radu Muntean
- Release date: 14 May 2015 (Cannes)
- Running time: 93 minutes
- Country: Romania
- Language: Romanian

One Floor Below (Romanian: Un etaj mai jos) is a 2015 Romanian drama film directed by Radu Muntean. It was screened in the Un Certain Regard section at the 2015 Cannes Film Festival. It was screened in the Contemporary World Cinema section of the 2015 Toronto International Film Festival.
