= Adrian Sitaru =

Romanian director, producer and actor (born 1971)

Adrian Sitaru (Romanian pronunciation: [adriˈan siˈtaru]) is a Romanian director, producer and actor, born in 1971. He is the author of several short films, of which Valuri ("Waves", 2007), the most well-known, has received numerous prizes.

Sitaru also worked with Costa Gavras in the making of Amen. (2002)

His first feature film, Pescuit sportiv for which, besides being the director, he also wrote the script, has been screened in film festivals from Toronto, Palm Springs, Estoril and in the main competition of the 2009 Premiers Plans Festival in Angers, France.

In 2010, his short film, Colivia ("The Cage") won the DAAD Short Film Award at the 60th Berlin International Film Festival (Berlinale).

== Selected filmography ==
- Hooked (2008)
- The Fixer (2016)
