= Deaths in October 2009 =

The following is a list of deaths in October 2009.

Entries for each day are listed alphabetically by surname. A typical entry lists information in the following sequence:

- Name, age, country of citizenship at birth, subsequent country of citizenship (if applicable), reason for notability, cause of death (if known), and reference.

== October 2009 ==
=== 1 ===
- Otar Chiladze, 76, Georgian writer, heart failure.
- André-Philippe Futa, 66, Congolese politician, Minister of the Economy and Foreign Trade (since 2002).
- Gunnar Haarberg, 92, Norwegian television presenter.
- Syed Kamal, 72, Pakistani actor.
- Lou Moro, 91, Canadian soccer player and coach.
- V. M. Muddiah, 80, Indian cricketer, stroke.
- Bhandit Rittakol, 58, Thai film director, producer and screenwriter, heart failure.
- Cintio Vitier, 88, Cuban poet.

=== 2 ===
- Alain Bernheim, 86, French-born American film producer, complications from dialysis.
- Marek Edelman, 86, Polish political and social activist, cardiologist, last surviving leader of the Warsaw Ghetto Uprising.
- Jack Evans, 80, Australian politician, Senator (1983–1984), co-founder of the Australian Democrats, cancer.
- Nat Finkelstein, 76, American photographer and photojournalist.
- Jørgen Jensen, 65, Danish Olympic runner.
- John "Mr. Magic" Rivas, 53, American radio personality, heart attack.
- Saleh Meki, 61, Eritrean cabinet minister and politician, heart attack.
- Peg Mullen, 92, American author, subject of film Friendly Fire.
- Desmond Plummer, Baron Plummer of St. Marylebone, 95, British politician, leader of Greater London Council (1967–1973).
- Rolf Rüssmann, 58, German football manager, prostate cancer.
- Herman D. Stein, 92, American professor (Case Western Reserve University).
- Harvey Veniot, 93, Canadian MLA for Pictou West (1956–1974), Speaker of the Nova Scotia House of Assembly (1961–1968).
- Shaun Wylie, 96, British mathematician and World War II codebreaker.

=== 3 ===
- Aleksandre Basilaia, 67, Georgian composer.
- Vladimir Beekman, 80, Estonian writer and translator.
- Fernando Caldeiro, 51, Argentine-born American astronaut, brain cancer.
- Fatimah el-Sharif, 98, Libyan Queen of Libya (1951–1969), widow of King Idris I.
- Myrtle K. Hilo, 80, Hawaiian taxicab driver and radio personality.
- Will Inman, 86, American poet, Parkinson's disease.
- Robert Kirby, 61, British folk rock arranger.
- Ernie Lopez, 64, American boxer, complications from dementia.
- Reinhard Mohn, 88, German entrepreneur and publisher, founder of Bertelsmann Foundation.
- Michel Nédélec, 69, French Olympic cyclist.
- Vasile Louis Puscas, 94, American Bishop of St George's in Canton in the Romanian Catholic Church.
- Frank Zoppetti, 93, American football player (Pittsburgh Steelers).

=== 4 ===
- Frederick E. Bakutis, 96, American naval officer and flying ace.
- Koichi Haraguchi, 68, Japanese chief of staff, Imperial House of Japan, heart attack.
- Veikko Huovinen, 82, Finnish writer.
- Fred Kaan, 80, Dutch-born British clergyman and hymn writer.
- Gerhard Kaufhold, 80, German footballer.
- Grace Keagy, 87, American actress, ovarian cancer.
- Ernő Kolczonay, 56, Hungarian Olympic silver medal-winning fencer (1980, 1992).
- James Lin Xili, 91, Chinese underground first Bishop of Wenzhou (since 1992), Alzheimer's disease.
- Shōichi Nakagawa, 56, Japanese politician, Minister of Finance (2008–2009).
- Nikiforos of Didymoteicho, 78, Greek bishop of Didymoteicho.
- Günther Rall, 91, German Luftwaffe flying ace during World War II, heart attack.
- Mercedes Sosa, 74, Argentinian folk singer, liver failure.
- Bronisław Żurakowski, 98, Polish aerospace engineer.

=== 5 ===
- Armando Acosta Cordero, 88, Cuban guerrilla.
- Tommy Capel, 87, English footballer (Nottingham Forest).
- Leon Clarke, 76, American football player (Los Angeles Rams), pancreatitis.
- James Duesenberry, 91, American economist.
- Ron Finley, 76, American football coach (Campbellsville Tigers).
- Israel Gelfand, 96, Russian mathematician.
- Gino Giugni, 82, Italian minister of labor and social security (1993–1994).
- Giselher Klebe, 84, German composer.
- David Lake, 66, American winemaker.
- Sir Hugh Lloyd-Jones, 87, British classical scholar.
- Brian Powell, 35, American baseball player, suicide by gunshot.
- René Sommer, 58, Swiss inventor, co-inventor of the computer mouse.
- Johnny Williams, 77, English rugby union player.

=== 6 ===
- Jimmy Bates, 99, Australian football player, oldest living Australian Football League player.
- Pamela Blake, 94, American actress, natural causes.
- Douglas Campbell, 87, Scottish-born Canadian actor, complications of diabetes and heart disease.
- Raymond Federman, 81, French-born American writer and academic, cancer.
- Aengus Finucane, 77, Irish priest, chief executive of Concern Worldwide (1981–1997).
- Pyarelal Khandelwal, 84, Indian politician, cancer.
- Ruth L. Kirschstein, 82, American pathologist.
- Werner Maihofer, 90, German Minister of the Interior (1974–1978).
- Donna Mae Mims, 82, American race driver, first female SCCA champion, stroke.
- Ramanna Rai, 79, Indian politician.
- Gilberto Zaldívar, 75, American founder of the Repertorio Español, complications of dementia with Lewy bodies.

=== 7 ===
- Ben Ali, 82, American restaurateur (Ben's Chili Bowl), heart failure.
- Bikram Keshari Deo, 58, Indian politician, cardiac arrest.
- Irving Penn, 92, American fashion photographer (Vogue).
- Shelby Singleton, 77, American record producer and record label owner (Sun Records), brain cancer.
- Helen Watts, 81, British contralto.
- Pedro E. Zadunaisky, 91, Argentinian astronomer and mathematician.

=== 8 ===
- Gordon Boyd, 86, British-born Australian television personality.
- James Delgrosso, 66, American politician, mayor of Bethlehem, Pennsylvania (2003–2004), leukemia.
- Gerald Ferguson, 72, American-born Canadian artist.
- Juan Carlos Mareco, 83, Uruguayan actor.
- Alex McCrae, 89, Scottish football player (Middlesbrough) and manager (Falkirk).
- Torsten Reißmann, 53, German Olympic judoka.
- Jean Sage, 68, French racing driver, former sporting director of the Renault F1 team.
- Michael Angelo Saltarelli, 77, American Roman Catholic Bishop of Wilmington (1995–2008), bone cancer.
- Abu Talib, 70, American blues musician, cancer.
- Sir Sydney Walling, 102, Antiguan cricketer.

=== 9 ===
- Arne Bakker, 79, Norwegian football and bandy player.
- Francis Baldacchino, 73, Maltese-born Bishop of Malindi, Kenya.
- Raymond A. Brown, 94, American lawyer, chronic obstructive pulmonary disease.
- Aldo Buzzi, 99, Italian author and architect.
- Arturo "Zambo" Cavero, 68, Peruvian folk singer, complications from sepsis.
- Jacques Chessex, 75, Swiss author, first non-French recipient of the Prix Goncourt, heart attack.
- Anne Friedberg, 57, American professor (USC School of Cinematic Arts), colorectal cancer
- Vyacheslav Ivankov, 69, Russian crime figure, gunshot wounds.
- Stuart M. Kaminsky, 75, American mystery writer, hepatitis.
- Barry Letts, 84, British television actor, director and producer (Doctor Who).
- John Daido Loori, 78, American Zen Buddhist monk, lung cancer.
- Hermann Raich, 75, Austrian Roman Catholic Bishop of Wabag (1982–2008).
- Louis Sanmarco, 97, French administrator, governor (1954–1957) and High Commissioner (1957–1958) of Ubangi-Shari.
- Richard Sonnenfeldt, 86, German-born American interpreter at the Nuremberg Trials, complications from a stroke.
- Dré Steemans, 55, Belgian television and radio host, cardiac arrest.
- Horst Szymaniak, 75, German footballer.
- Rusty Wier, 65, American country music singer-songwriter, cancer.

=== 10 ===
- Luis Aguilé, 73, Argentine singer and songwriter, stomach cancer.
- Paul Bloom, 70, American lawyer, recovered $6 billion for the Department of Energy, pancreatic cancer.
- Sonny Bradshaw, 83, Jamaican jazz musician, stroke.
- Stephen Gately, 33, Irish pop singer (Boyzone), pulmonary edema.
- Larry Jansen, 89, American baseball player (New York Giants, Cincinnati Reds), heart failure and pneumonia.
- Joan Orenstein, 85, British-born Canadian actress.
- Lionel Pincus, 78, American businessman, founder of Warburg Pincus.
- Jack Rose, 92, British WWII fighter pilot and colonial administrator.
- Carol Tomlinson-Keasey, 66, American psychologist, breast cancer.

=== 11 ===
- Joan Martí i Alanis, 80, Spanish archbishop, Bishop of Urgell and co-Prince of Andorra (1971–2003).
- Peter Callanan, 74, Irish politician, member of the Seanad (since 1997).
- Patrick Hannan, 68, British broadcaster, author and journalist.
- Gustav Kral, 26, Austrian footballer, car accident.
- Abigail McLellan, 40, Scottish artist, multiple sclerosis.
- Veronika Neugebauer, 40, German voice actress, colorectal cancer.
- Alan Peters, 76, British furniture designer.
- Halit Refiğ, 75, Turkish film director, cholangiocarcinoma.

=== 12 ===
- Samy Abu Zaid, 30, Egyptian footballer, car accident.
- Maurice Agis, 77, British sculptor.
- Dietrich von Bothmer, 90, German-born American art historian, curator of the Metropolitan Museum of Art.
- Alberto Castagnetti, 66, Italian Olympic swimmer, complications from cardiac surgery.
- Mildred Cohn, 96, American biochemist.
- Mikheil Kalatozishvili, 50, Russian film director, script writer and producer, heart attack.
- Donald Kaufman, 79, American toy car collector, heart attack.
- Brendan Mullen, 60, American punk impresario and club owner (The Masque), stroke.
- Stan Palk, 87, English footballer (Liverpool, Port Vale).
- Dickie Peterson, 63, American rock singer (Blue Cheer), liver cancer.
- Joe Rosen, 88, American Golden Age comic book letterer.
- Frank Vandenbroucke, 34, Belgian cyclist, pulmonary embolism.
- Ian Wallace, 90, British bass-baritone singer.

=== 13 ===
- Stephen Barnett, 73, American legal scholar, opposed the Newspaper Preservation Act of 1970, cardiac arrest.
- Cullen Bryant, 58, American football player (Los Angeles Rams), natural causes.
- Rodger Doxsey, 62, American physicist and astronomer, cancer.
- Richard Foster, 63, American member of the Alaska House of Representatives, heart and kidney disease.
- Eugene Maxwell Frank, 101, American bishop of The Methodist Church.
- Atle Jebsen, 73, Norwegian shipowner and businessman, traffic collision.
- William Wayne Justice, 89, American federal judge.
- Lü Zhengcao, 104, Chinese general, last survivor of the original Shang Jiang.
- Winston Mankunku Ngozi, 66, South African saxophonist
- Al Martino, 82, American singer and actor (The Godfather), first person to top the UK Singles Chart.
- Daniel Melnick, 77, American studio executive, film producer and television producer, lung cancer.
- Paul Barbă Neagră, 80, Romanian film director and essayist.
- Roger Nixon, 88, American composer, complications from leukemia.
- Nan C. Robertson, 83, American Pulitzer Prize-winning journalist and author, heart disease.
- Orane Simpson, 26, Jamaican football player, stabbed.
- Richard T. Whitcomb, 88, American aeronautical engineer, pneumonia
- Werner Zandt, 81, German Olympic sprinter.

=== 14 ===
- Lou Albano, 76, American professional wrestler and manager, actor (The Super Mario Bros. Super Show!), heart attack.
- Wilf K. Backhaus, 62, Canadian role-playing game designer.
- Antônio do Carmo Cheuiche, 82, Brazilian Auxiliary Bishop of Santa Maria (1969–1971) and Porto Alegre (1971–2001).
- Fred Cress, 71, British-born Australian artist, Archibald Prize winner (1988), pancreatic cancer.
- Roy Lane, 74, British hillclimbing competitor, peritonitis.
- C. B. Muthamma, 85, Indian first female diplomat and ambassador.
- Willard Varnell Oliver, 88, American Navajo code talker.
- Martyn Sanderson, 71, New Zealand actor (The Lord of the Rings: The Fellowship of the Ring).
- Bruce Wasserstein, 61, American investment banker and businessman, arrhythmia.
- Collin Wilcox, 74, American actress (To Kill a Mockingbird), brain cancer.
- Leo Williams, 68, Australian rugby union official.

=== 15 ===
- George P. Jenkins, 94, American chairman of Metlife, assisted expansion of ABC and Pan Am, heart failure.
- Josias Kumpf, 84, Austrian Nazi concentration camp guard.
- Elizabeth Clare Prophet, 70, American New Age religious leader, co-founder of The Summit Lighthouse, Alzheimer's disease.
- Tollak B. Sirnes, 86, Norwegian physician, psychiatrist and pharmacologist.
- Heinz Versteeg, 70, Dutch football player, cancer.
- Philip L. White, 86, American historian, cancer.

=== 16 ===
- Bob Davis, 77, American politician, U.S. Representative for Michigan (1979–1993), heart and kidney failure.
- Inglis Drever, 10, British hurdles racehorse, euthanised.
- Jose Herrera, 67, Venezuelan baseball player.
- Meilė Lukšienė, 96, Lithuanian cultural historian, member of the Sąjūdis.
- Andrés Montes, 53, Spanish sports commentator.
- Marian Przykucki, 85, Polish Roman Catholic Metropolitan Archbishop of Szczecin-Kamień (1992–1999).
- John Ramsden, 61, British historian.
- George Tuska, 93, American comic book artist (Iron Man, Captain Marvel, Teen Titans).

=== 17 ===
- Dame Doreen Blumhardt, 95, New Zealand potter.
- Carla Boni, 84, Italian singer.
- Diana Elles, Baroness Elles, 88, British diplomat and politician.
- Ian Hagemoen, 68, Canadian football player (death announced on this date).
- Jay Johnson, 66, American U.S. Representative for Wisconsin (1997–1999), U.S. Mint Director (2000–2001), heart attack.
- Vladimir Kashpur, 82, Russian film actor, People's Artist of Russia.
- Kazuhiko Katō, 62, Japanese musician (The Folk Crusaders, Sadistic Mika Band), suicide by hanging.
- Louisa Mark, 49, British lovers rock singer, complications from a stomach ulcer.
- Norma Fox Mazer, 78, American author, brain cancer.
- Vic Mizzy, 93, American composer (The Addams Family, Green Acres).
- Rosanna Schiaffino, 69, Italian film actress, cancer.
- Sheldon Segal, 83, American reproductive biologist.
- Michael Shea, 71, British diplomat, press secretary to Queen Elizabeth II (1978–1987), dementia.
- Brian Campbell Vickery, 91, British information scientist.

=== 18 ===
- Ion Cojar, 78, Romanian actor and film director, Parkinson's disease.
- Ruth Duckworth, 90, American sculptor.
- Ha Bik Chuen, 83-84, Hong Kong painter.
- Jasper Howard, 20, American football player, stabbed.
- Lenore Kandel, 77, American poet, lung cancer.
- Leonard B. Keller, 62, American soldier, Medal of Honor recipient, motorcycle accident.
- Sir Ludovic Kennedy, 89, British author and journalist, pneumonia.
- Adriaan Kortlandt, 91, Dutch biologist.
- Ovidiu Mușetescu, 54, Romanian politician, cancer.
- Ignacio Ponseti, 95, Spanish physician and inventor (Ponseti method).
- Nancy Spero, 83, American artist, heart failure.
- Basie Vivier, 82, South African rugby union player, captain of the Springboks (1956).

=== 19 ===
- Moni Fanan, 63, Israeli basketball team manager, suicide by hanging.
- Werner Heubeck, 85, German-born British managing director of Ulsterbus and Citybus, cancer.
- Joe Hutton Jr., 81, American basketball player, heart attack.
- Sushila Kerketta, 71, Indian politician, heart attack.
- Vladimír Klokočka, 80, Czech politician and jurist, signatory to Charter 77 manifesto.
- Shlomo Lorincz, 91, Hungarian-born Israeli politician, heart failure.
- Milun Marović, 62, Serbian Olympic basketball player.
- Reg McKay, 56, British journalist and crime fiction writer, brain and lung cancer.
- Angelo Musi, 91, American basketball player.
- Nimma Raja Reddy, 72, Indian politician.
- Alberto Testa, 82, Italian composer and lyricist.
- Radu Timofte, 60, Romanian intelligence officer, director of the Serviciul Român de Informaţii (2001–2006), leukemia.
- Howard Unruh, 88, American spree killer.
- Joseph Wiseman, 91, Canadian actor (Dr. No).

=== 20 ===
- Margaret Bisbrown, 90, British Olympic diver.
- Yvonne Carter, 50, British general practitioner and medical academic, breast cancer.
- Attila Dargay, 83, Hungarian animator.
- Colin Douglas-Smith, 91, Australian Olympic rower.
- Clifford Hansen, 97, American politician, Governor of Wyoming (1963–1967) and U.S. Senator (1967–1978).
- Robert C. Lautman, 85, American architectural photographer.
- Carl Fredrik Lowzow, 82, Norwegian politician.
- Charles Mills, 88, American painter.
- Doreen Reid Nakamarra, 54, Australian Aboriginal artist, pneumonia.
- Jef Nys, 82, Belgian comic book artist (Jommeke).
- Sultan Pepper, 47, American comedy writer, Emmy Award winner (The Ben Stiller Show).
- Yuri Ryazanov, 22, Russian artistic gymnast, traffic collision.
- Winai Senniam, 51, Thai parliamentarian, liver and colon cancer.

=== 21 ===
- Andrey Balashov, 63, Russian Olympic silver (1976) and bronze (1980) medal-winning sailor.
- Louise Cooper, 57, British novelist, aneurysm.
- Lionel Davidson, 87, British novelist, lung cancer.
- Clinton Ford, 77, British singer.
- John Jarman, 78, Welsh football player (Barnsley, Walsall) and coach.
- Iain Macphail, Lord Macphail, 71, British judge and legal scholar.
- Paul Massey, 83, British Olympic silver medal-winning (1948) rower.
- Yōko Minamida, 76, Japanese actress.
- Jack Nelson, 80, American Pulitzer Prize-winning journalist (1960), pancreatic cancer.
- Redmond O'Neill, 55, British political activist.
- Sirone, 69, American jazz musician.
- Ted Sizer, 77, American education reformer, colorectal cancer.
- Giuliano Vassalli, 94, Italian politician.

=== 22 ===
- Maryanne Amacher, 66, American experimental composer, sound artist, and installation artist, complications from a stroke.
- Paul Andrews, 53, Australian politician, cancer.
- Nicholas Atkin, 49, British historian, meningitis.
- Daniel Bekker, 77, South African boxer, Parkinson's and Alzheimer's diseases.
- Ray B. Browne, 87, American educator, scholar of popular culture.
- Pierre Chaunu, 86, French historian.
- Howard Darwin, 78, Canadian sports promoter, founder of the Ottawa 67's, complications from heart surgery.
- Luther Dixon, 78, American songwriter.
- Evert Heinström, 97, Finnish Olympic athlete.
- Ray Lambert, 87, Welsh footballer (Liverpool, Wales).
- Don Lane, 75, American-born Australian entertainer, Alzheimer's disease.
- Don Ivan Punchatz, 73, American science fiction artist, cardiac arrest.
- Herman Reich, 91, American baseball player (Washington Senators, Chicago Cubs, Cleveland Indians).
- Maciej Rybiński, 64, Polish journalist and publicist.
- Soupy Sales, 83, American comedian and television host, cancer.
- Enver Shehu, 75, Albanian football player and manager.
- Suchart Chaovisith, 69, Thai politician, Finance Minister (2003–2004) and Deputy Prime Minister (2004), laryngeal cancer.
- Libero Tresoldi, 88, Italian Roman Catholic Bishop of Crema.
- Albert Watson, 91, English footballer (Huddersfield Town, Oldham Athletic).
- Elmer Winter, 97, American founder of Manpower Inc.
- George Patrick Ziemann, 68, American Roman Catholic Bishop of Santa Rosa.

=== 23 ===
- Linda Day, 71, American television director, leukemia and breast cancer.
- Trevor Denning, 86, British artist.
- Suhrab Faqir, 75, Pakistani folk singer, kidney disease.
- Chris Hawk, 58, American surfer, oral cancer.
- Lou Jacobi, 95, Canadian-born American actor (The Diary of Anne Frank).
- Ture Kailo, Vanuatuan politician and member of parliament.
- John Kenley, 103, American summer theater producer, complications of pneumonia.
- Ken Perkins, 83, British army general.
- Jack Poole, 76, Canadian real estate developer, pancreatic cancer.
- Ron Sobieszczyk, 75, American basketball player (DePaul Blue Demons, New York Knicks), degenerative brain disease.

=== 24 ===
- Bill Chadwick, 94, American hockey official and broadcaster.
- Yasuo Iwata, 67, Japanese actor, lung cancer.
- Norman Levitt, 66, American mathematician.
- Karl Reisinger, 73, Austrian Olympic judoka.

=== 25 ===
- Yoshiteru Abe, 68, Japanese professional Go player.
- Dee Anthony, 83, American music manager, pneumonia.
- Maksharip Aushev, 43, Russian political activist and opposition leader in Ingushetia, businessman (Ingushetia.org), shot.
- Adoor Bhavani, 82, Indian actress.
- Billy Bibit, 59, Filipino soldier and coup d'état leader, complications from a stroke.
- Camillo Cibin, 83, Italian former commander of the Corps of Gendarmerie of Vatican City.
- Fritz Darges, 96, German World War II Waffen-SS officer.
- Seymour Fromer, 87, American founder of Judah L. Magnes Museum.
- Leslie A. Geddes, 88, American electrical engineer and physiologist.
- Lawrence Halprin, 93, American architect (Ghirardelli Square, Franklin Delano Roosevelt Memorial).
- Gerhard Knoop, 88, Norwegian theatre director.
- Chittaranjan Kolhatkar, 86, Indian actor, heart attack.
- S. Ashok Kumar, 62, Indian jurist.
- René Marigil, 81, Spanish cyclist.
- Mike McQueen, 52, American journalist, Associated Press bureau chief for Louisiana and Mississippi, cancer.
- Ingeborg Mello, 90, Argentinian Olympic athlete.
- Heinz-Klaus Metzger, 77, German music critic.
- Lázaro Pérez Jiménez, 66, Mexican Roman Catholic Bishop of Celaya.
- Alexander Piatigorsky, 80, Russian-born British philosopher.
- Jeffry Picower, 67, American philanthropist, associate of Bernard Madoff, drowned after heart attack.
- Kamala Sankrityayan, 89, Indian writer and litterateur.
- Tangi Satyanarayana, 78, Indian politician, speaker of the Vidhan Sabha of Andhra Pradesh (1983–1985).
- Thea Segall, 80, Romanian photographer who lived in Venezuela since 1958 until her death.
- Kevin Widemond, 23, American basketball player, heart attack.

=== 26 ===
- Daniel Acharuparambil, 70, Indian Roman Catholic archbishop of Verapoly (since 1996), kidney failure.
- Teel Bivins, 61, American member of the Texas Senate (1989–2004), Ambassador to Sweden (2004–2006).
- Sabino Fernández Campo, 1st Count of Latores, 91, Spanish Chief of the Royal House, key figure in failed 23-F coup d'état.
- Lea Fite, 54, American politician, member of the Alabama House of Representatives (since 2002), apparent seizure.
- Bill Kirk, 75, American baseball player.
- Fred McCarthy, 91, American cartoonist.
- Yoshirō Muraki, 85, Japanese film production designer and art director, heart failure.
- George Naʻope, 81, American musician and hula expert, founder of the Merrie Monarch Festival, cancer.
- Troy Smith, 87, American businessman, founder of Sonic Drive-In chain, natural causes.

=== 27 ===
- Tapani Aartomaa, 75, Finnish professor and graphic designer.
- Frank Brady Jr., 64, Irish footballer (Shamrock Rovers), cancer.
- John David Carson, 57, American actor (Falcon Crest).
- August Coppola, 75, American writer, literature professor and father of Nicolas Cage, heart attack.
- Roy DeCarava, 89, American photographer.
- Alex Harris, 34, Australian paralympian swimmer, gold medalist (2004), suicide by train.
- David Shepherd, 68, British cricketer and umpire, lung cancer.
- Paul Zamecnik, 96, American molecular biologist.

=== 28 ===
- Olga Kevelos, 85, British motorcycle trials rider.
- Leslie King, 59, Trinidadian Olympic cyclist.
- Paul Manz, 90, American Lutheran organist and composer.
- Taylor Mitchell, 19, Canadian singer–songwriter, coyote attack.
- Jerry Morris, 99, British epidemiologist.
- Ted Nebbeling, 65, Dutch-born Canadian politician, British Columbia MLA (1996–2005), Mayor of Whistler, colon cancer.

=== 29 ===
- Russell L. Ackoff, 90, American organizational theorist, complications from surgery.
- Bei Shizhang, 106, Chinese biologist and educator.
- Jean-François Bergier, 77, Swiss historian.
- Jan Gąsienica Ciaptak, 86, Polish Olympic skier.
- Charles E. Conrad, 84, American acting coach, kidney failure.
- San'yūtei Enraku V, 76, Japanese comedian (Shōten), lung cancer.
- Gino Fracas, 79, Canadian football player.
- Olav Hodne, 88, Norwegian missionary.
- June Maule, 92, American businesswoman, owner of Maule Air.
- John O'Quinn, 68, American lawyer, traffic collision.
- Norman Painting, 85, British radio actor (The Archers), heart failure.
- Jürgen Rieger, 63, German lawyer and politician (NPD), stroke.
- Beat Rüedi, 89, Swiss Olympic bronze medal-winning (1948) ice hockey player.
- Alexander Schure, 89, American academic, founder of NYIT, Chancellor of NSU (1970–1985), Alzheimer's disease.
- Dave Treen, 81, American politician, Governor of Louisiana (1980–1984), respiratory disease.

=== 30 ===
- Juvenal Amarijo, 85, Brazilian football player, respiratory failure.
- Norton Buffalo, 58, American singer-songwriter, blues harmonica player (Steve Miller Band), lung cancer.
- Ramata Diakité, 32–33, Malian Wassoulou musician, hepatitis A.
- Forest Evashevski, 91, American football coach (Iowa Hawkeyes), cancer.
- Claude Lévi-Strauss, 100, French anthropologist and author.
- Michelle Triola Marvin, 76, American plaintiff in landmark 'palimony' lawsuit (Marvin v. Marvin), lung cancer.
- June Middleton, 83, Australian with polio, world's longest survivor in an iron lung.
- Alick Rowe, 70, British television and radio writer, heart attack.
- Howie Schultz, 87, American baseball and basketball player, cancer.
- František Veselý, 65, Czech football player.
- Igor Vyazmikin, 43, Russian ice hockey player.
- Eugenia A. Wordsworth-Stevenson, Liberian diplomat.

=== 31 ===
- Roque Antonio Adames Rodríguez, 81, Dominican Roman Catholic Bishop of Santiago de los Caballeros.
- Tim Bickerstaff, 67, New Zealand radio personality.
- Chen Lin, 39, Chinese pop singer, suicide by jumping.
- Hugh Dinwiddy, 97, British cricketer.
- Stanley Ellis, 83, British linguistics scholar.
- Harry Gauss, 57, Canadian soccer coach, brain cancer.
- Pat Keysell, 83, British television presenter.
- Lee Hu-rak, 85, South Korean spy chief, Director of the National Intelligence Service (1970–1973), brain tumor.
- Mustafa Mahmoud, 87, Egyptian scientist, author and philosopher.
- John Mason, 89, British historian and librarian.
- Qian Xuesen, 97, Chinese scientist and co-founder of the JPL.
- Steve Reid, 94, American football player (Northwestern Wildcats).
- Neguinho do Samba, 54, Brazilian percussionist, founder of Olodum, heart failure.
- Jan Wejchert, 59, Polish businessman and media mogul, co-founder of ITI Group, co-owner of TVN, heart attack.
- Tom Wheatcroft, 87, British businessman, owner of Donington Park race circuit.
