= Maule M-7 =

American light aircraft

M-7, MX-7, MXT-7
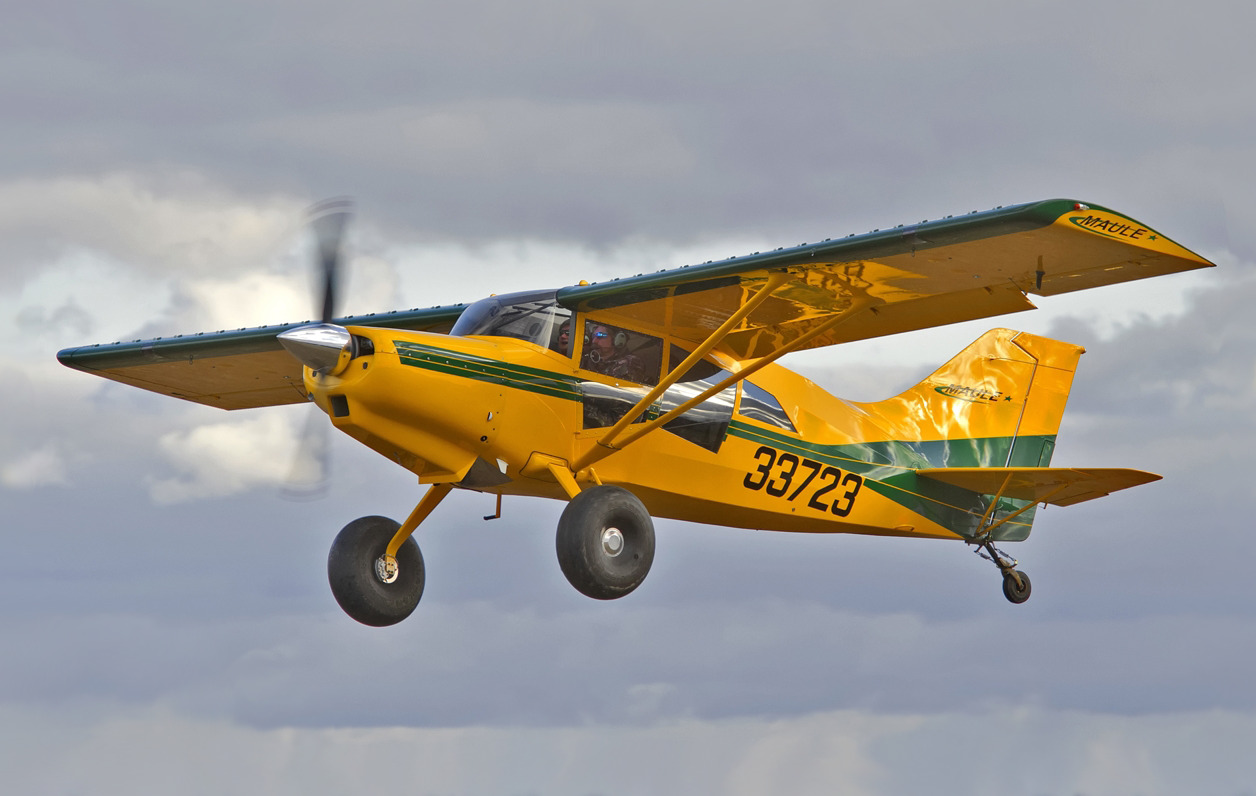
- Maule M-7

General information
- Type: Utility aircraft
- National origin: United States
- Manufacturer: Maule Air
- Designer: Belford Maule
- Number built: ca. 500 by 1995

History
- First flight: 1984

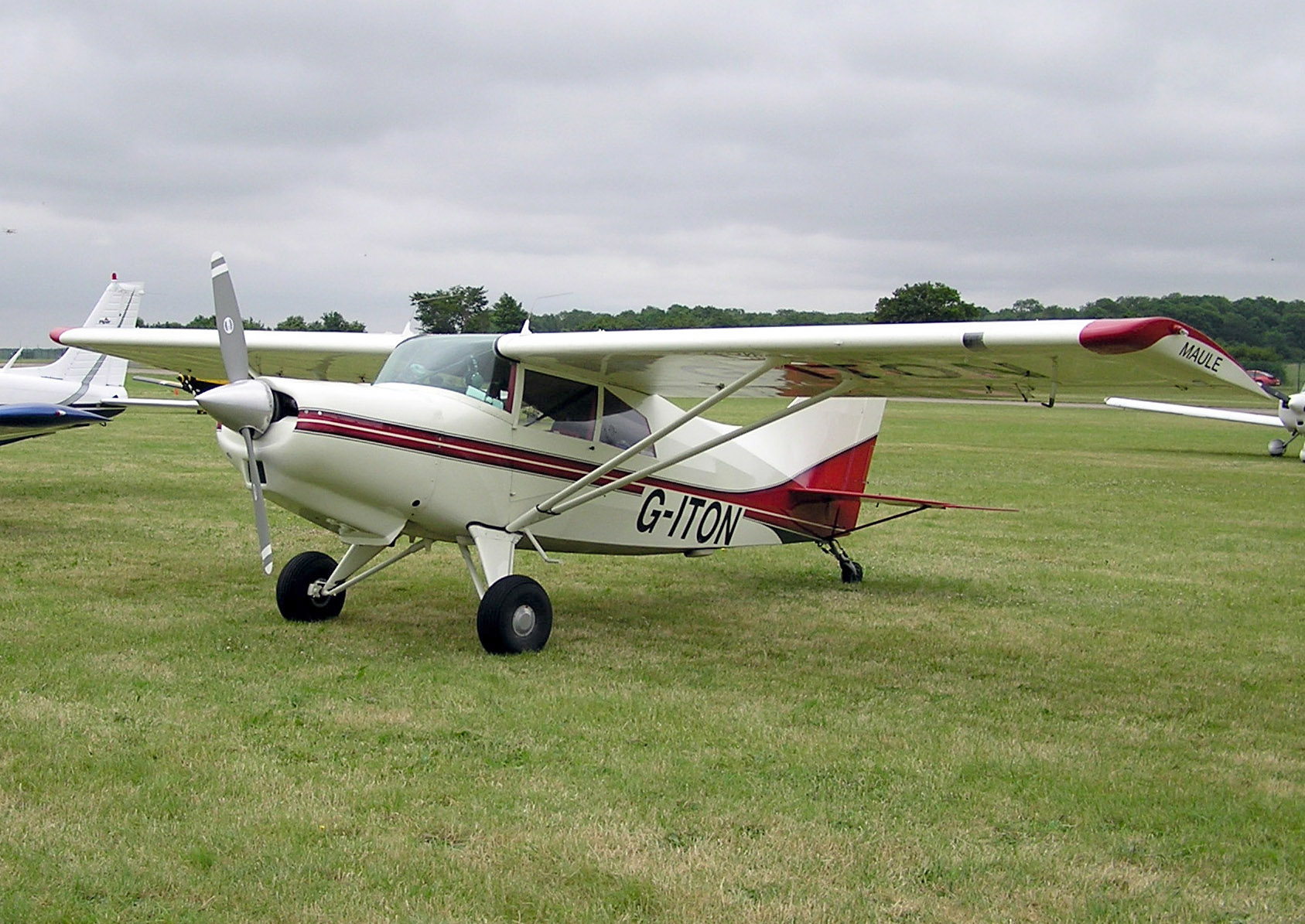
Maule MX-7-235

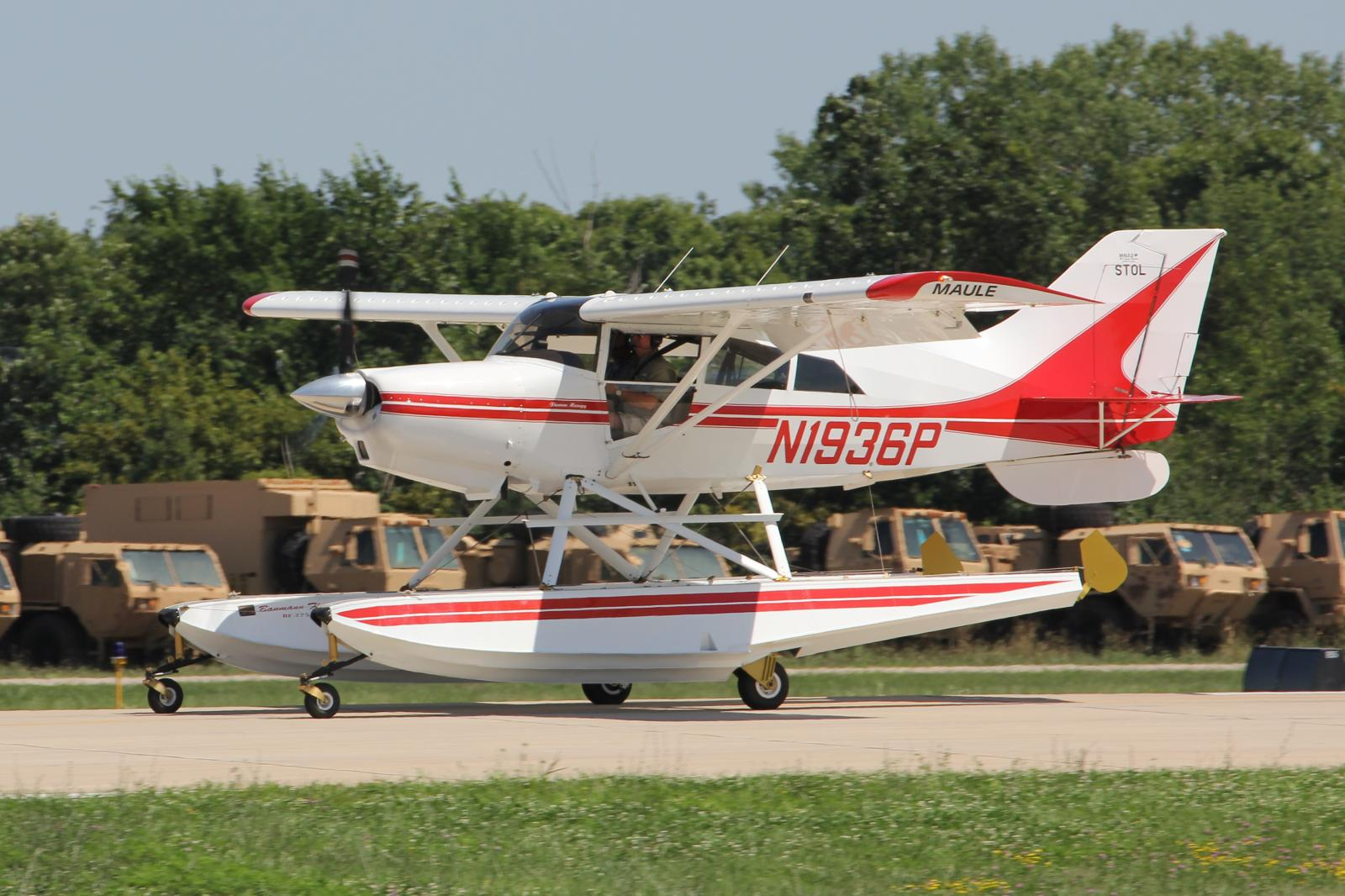
Maule M-7-235C on amphibious floats

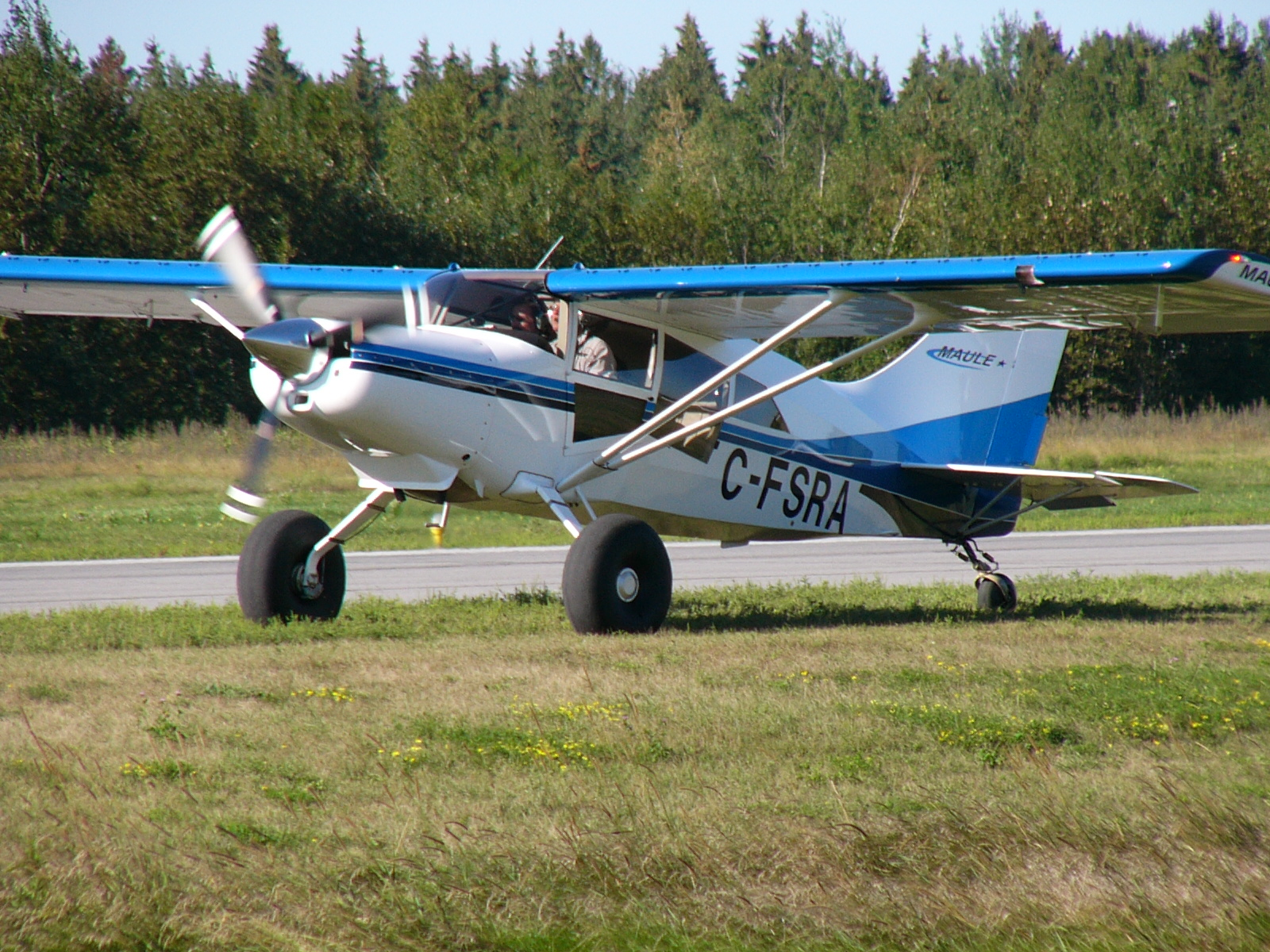
Maule M-7-235C on tundra tires

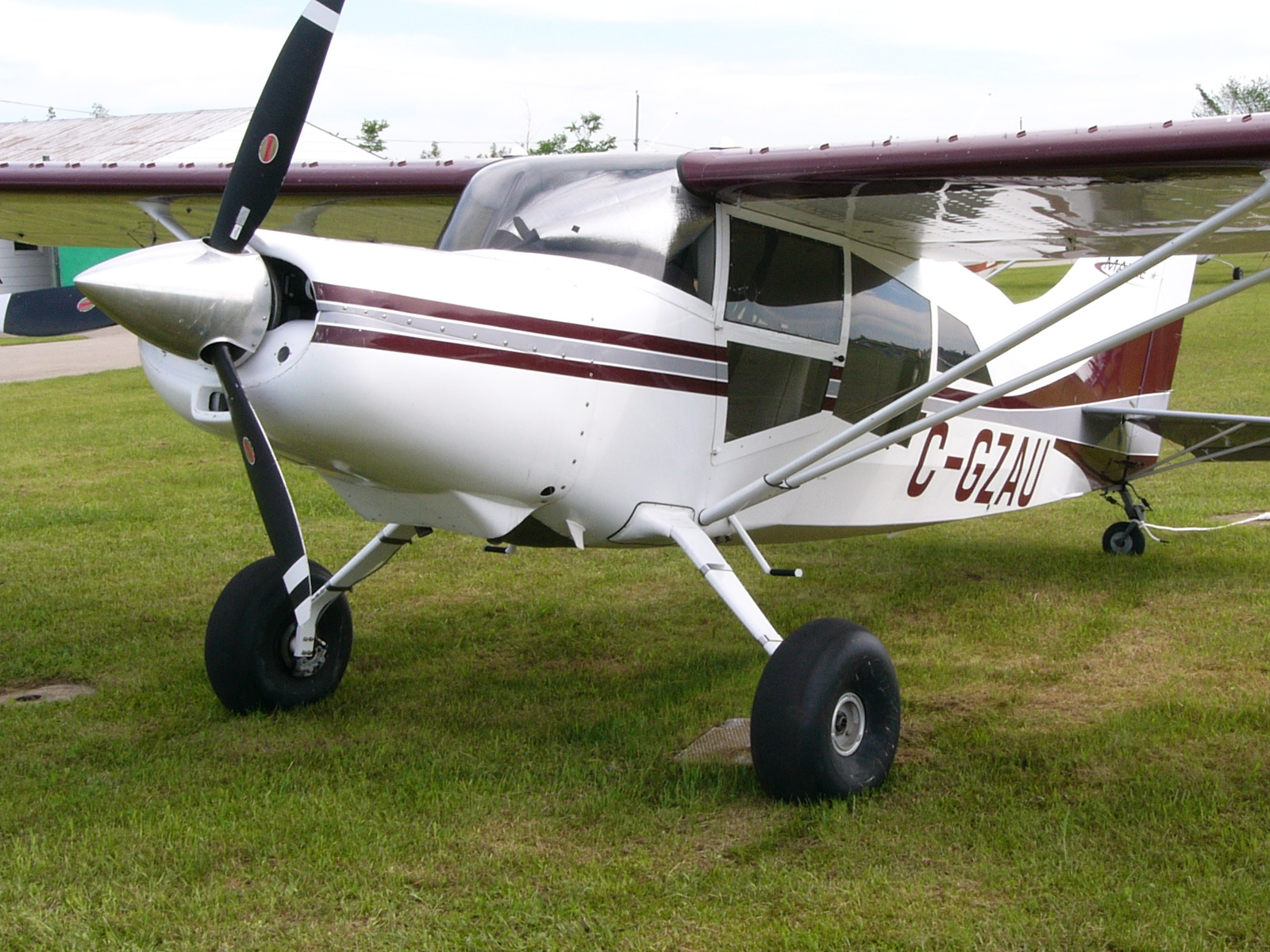
Maule M-7-260C Orion

The Maule M-7 is a family of single-engine light aircraft that has been manufactured in the United States since the mid-1980s.

== Design and development ==
Based on the Maule M-4, it is a high-wing, strut-braced monoplane of conventional configuration, available with tailwheel or optional tricycle wheeled undercarriage and frequently used as a floatplane with twin floats. The basic M-7 has a longer cabin than its predecessors the M-5 & M-6, with two seats in front, a bench seat for up to three passengers behind them, and (like the M-6) an optional third row of "kiddie seats" at the rear. Extra cabin windows can be fitted if the "kiddie seats" are to be used. The MX-7 uses the same fuselage as the M-6, which is a modified M-5 fuselage but the same wing span as the M-5, and incorporates the increased fuel tankage, Hoerner-style wingtips and five-position flaps designed for the M-7.

The M-7 family has been produced both with piston and turboprop engines.

== Variants ==
=== M-7 series ===
M-7-235 Super Rocket
Similar to M-6-235 with lengthened cabin. Tailwheel undercarriage and Lycoming O-540 engine
M-7-235B Super Rocket
Same as M7-235 including Oleo-Strut main landing gear.
M-7-235C Orion
Same as M7-235B but with sprung aluminum main landing gear and Lycoming IO-540 engine.
M-7-260
M-7-260C

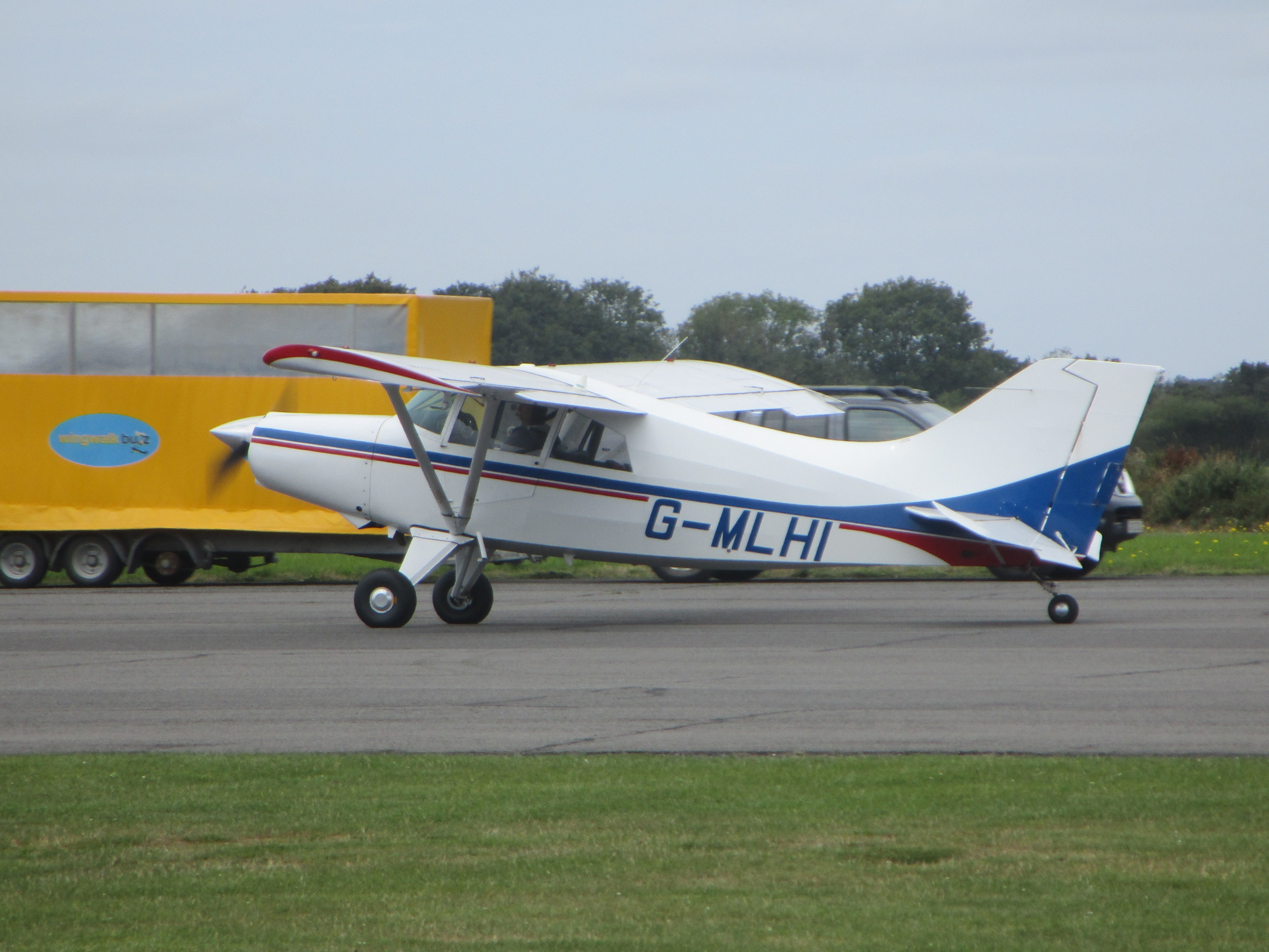
G-MLHI - Maule MX-7-180 Star Rocket at Dunkeswell Aerodrome without tundra tyres

M-7-420 Starcraft Turboprop
M-7-235 with Allison 250 turboprop engine
MT-7-235 Tri-Gear
Super Rocket with tricycle undercarriage
MT-7-260

=== MX-7 series ===
MX-7 Rocket
MX-7-160 Sportplane
M-6 fuselage with M-5 wings. Lycoming O-320 engine
MX-7-180 Star Rocket
MX-7 with lengthened cabin. Optional third row of seats with windows. Lycoming O-360 engine
MX-7-180A Sportplane and Comet
MX-7-180B Star Rocket
MX-7-180C Millennium
MX-7-250 Starcraft
MX-7 with Allison 250 turboprop engine
MX-7-420 Starcraft Turboprop
MX-7-235 with Allison 250 turboprop engine
MXT-7-160 Comet
MX-7-160 with tricycle undercarriage
MXT-7-180 Star Rocket
MX-7-180 with tricycle undercarriage

== Specifications (M-7-235B) ==
Data from manufacturer and FAA

General characteristics

- Crew: one
- Capacity: four passengers
- Length: 23.67 ft (7.21 m)
- Wingspan: 32.92 ft (10.03 m)
- Height: 6.33 ft (1.93 m)
- Empty weight: 1,549 lb (703 kg) typical, equipped
- Gross weight: 2,500 lb (1,134 kg)
- Fuel capacity: 40 U.S. gallons (150 L; 33 imp gal) usable (standard)
- Powerplant: 1 × Lycoming O-540-J1A5D six cylinder, horizontally-opposed, air-cooled aircraft engine, 235 hp (175 kW)
- Propellers: 2-bladed Hartzell Propeller HC-C2YR-1BF/F8468A-6R constant speed propeller

Performance

- Cruise speed: 147 mph (237 km/h, 128 kn) maximum structural cruising speed
- Stall speed: 49 mph (80 km/h, 43 kn) flaps down
- Never exceed speed: 182 mph (293 km/h, 158 kn)
- g limits: +3.8/-1.5 g
