= Michael McQueen =

Michael McQueen may refer to:

- Mike McQueen (journalist) (?–2009), American journalist
- Mike McQueen (baseball) (1950–2017), former baseball pitcher

== See also ==
- Michael Sperberg-McQueen, American markup specialist
