= Paul Bloom =

Paul Bloom may refer to:

- Paul Bloom (lawyer) (1939–2009), American lawyer known for government cases against oil companies
- Paul Bloom (psychologist) (born 1963), Canadian American professor of psychology at Yale University
