= Honduran Air Force =

Air warfare branch of Honduras' military

- Fuerza Aérea Hondureña
- Honduran Air Force patch
- Founded: 14 April 1931; 95 years ago
- Country: Honduras
- Type: Air force
- Role: Aerial warfare
- Size: 16,500 personnel 86 aircraft
- Part of: Armed Forces of Honduras
- Motto: FAH
- Anniversaries: 14 April
- Engagements: Football War; Central American Crisis

Commanders
- Comandante General: General de Brigada Javier Barrientos Alvarado

Insignia
- Roundel

- Fin flash

Aircraft flown
- Attack: Cessna A-37
- Fighter: Northrop F-5
- Helicopter: Bell 412, Bell UH-1, Eurocopter EC145, MBB Bo 105
- Reconnaissance: Super King Air
- Trainer: Northrop F-5F, EMB-312 Tucano, Maule Air
- Transport: Cessna 208, Piper PA-31, Aero Commander 500 family, Let L-410 Turbolet

The Honduras Air Force (Spanish: Fuerza Aérea Hondureña, sometimes abbreviated to FAH in English) is the air force of Honduras. As such it is the air power arm of the Honduras Armed Forces.

== History ==
The first Honduras military flying took place on 18 April 1921 in a Bristol F.2b Fighter biplane flown by an American contracted pilot, while in 1923 the first government flying school was founded with the assistance of Italian investors. The forerunner of the modern air force, the Escuela Nacional de Aviación, or National Aviation School, came into being on 14 April 1931.

In 1938 it was renamed the Escuela Militar de Aviación y Fuerza Aérea Hondureña or Military Aviation School and Honduras Air Force, when its first combat aircraft were acquired. During World War II it fought against the Axis powers, between 1942 and 1944 performing anti-submarine patrols along its Caribbean coastline.

After the war the HAF re-equipped with aircraft from United States Army Air Forces and Royal Canadian Air Force stocks including five Lockheed P-38 Lightnings and five Bell P-63 Kingcobras which were its first high performance fighters. Honduras ratified the Inter-American Treaty of Reciprocal Assistance in 1947, and within the next 10 years the United States supplied new aircraft including 19 Vought F4U Corsair fighter bombers, several Douglas C-47 Skytrain transports, and six North American AT-6C armed- and six T-6G advanced trainers.

In 1969 Honduras fought the one week long Football War with El Salvador. The HAF managed to successfully bomb the Salvadorean fuel supplies at Acajutla and Cutuco, and fight the enemy's air force out of the sky. Captain Fernando Soto, flying the Vought Corsair, shot down three Salvadoran aircraft, two Corsairs and a P-51 Mustang. Later it provided close air support to the Honduras Army. After the cease fire, both countries tried unsuccessfully to acquire their first jets to replace their old propeller-driven aircraft.

The political climate eventually changed and by the mid-1970s the HAF re-equipped with 10 old ex-Yugoslav Canadair CL-13 Mk.4 Sabre, 16 ex-Israeli Dassault Super Mystère B2 and six new Cessna A-37B Dragonfly Counter-insurgency jets; plus several Bell UH-1B and UH-1H Huey Iroquois assault helicopters. The HAF was also reorganized, several new air bases were created and its name changed to Fuerza Aérea Hondureña only. These airplanes were used during the 1980s confrontation with the Sandinista government of Nicaragua.

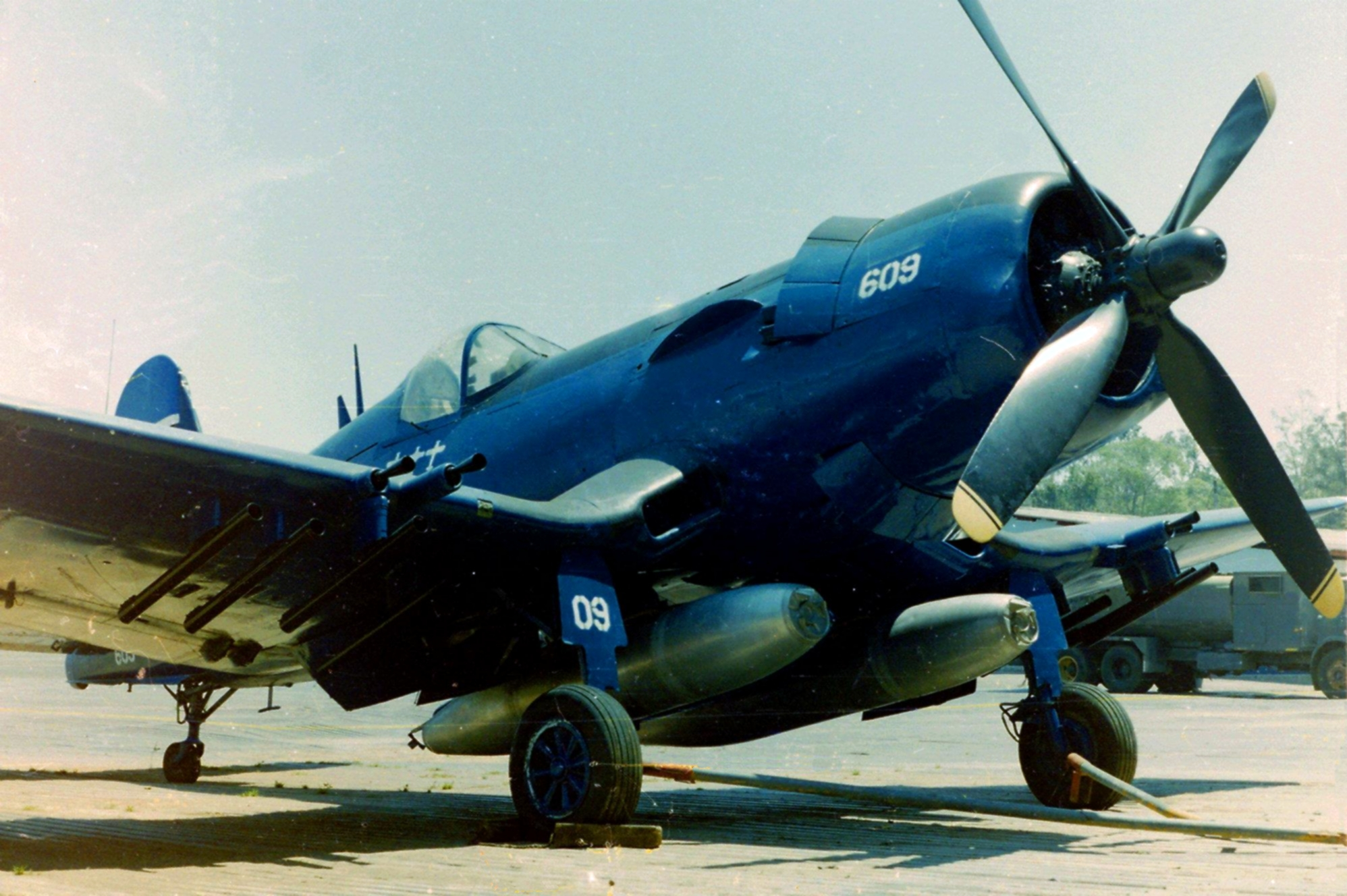
A F4U Corsair sold to Honduras in 1956.

Later that decade these were augmented or replaced with 11 ex-USAF OA/A-37B Dragonflies, 12 ex-USAF Northrop F-5E/F Tiger II interceptors, 12 new Embraer T-27 Tucano armed trainers and four new CASA 101BB-02 attack airplanes. They are supported with five ex-USAF Lockheed C-130A Hercules transports, five armed MD500D and 10 new Bell 412SP utility helicopters, which are all in use to this day.

In October 2014 Honduras received an Embraer Legacy 600, 16-seat VIP transport aircraft, which was valued at US$14 million. This aircraft (FAH-001) arrived at Toncontín airport on 15 October and was donated to the Honduras Air Force (Fuerza Aérea Hondureña, or FAH) by Taiwan. The VIP aircraft would also be available for medical evacuation in case of an emergency. Plans to buy two new Brazilian Embraer EMB-314 Super Tucano light fighters were also announced by the Honduran Foreign Ministry.

== Bases ==
The FAH operates from four air bases at Tegucigalpa, Comayagua, San Pedro Sula, and La Ceiba. Additionally, three air stations located at Catacamas, Alto Aguán (bomb range) and Puerto Lempira airstrips serve as forward operations locations-FOL. Also a radar station operates at La Mole peak. All bases operates as dual civil and military aviation facilities. Comayagua is home to the Air Force Academy (Academia Militar de Aviación de Honduras Capitán Raúl Roberto Barahona Lagos).

== Aircraft ==
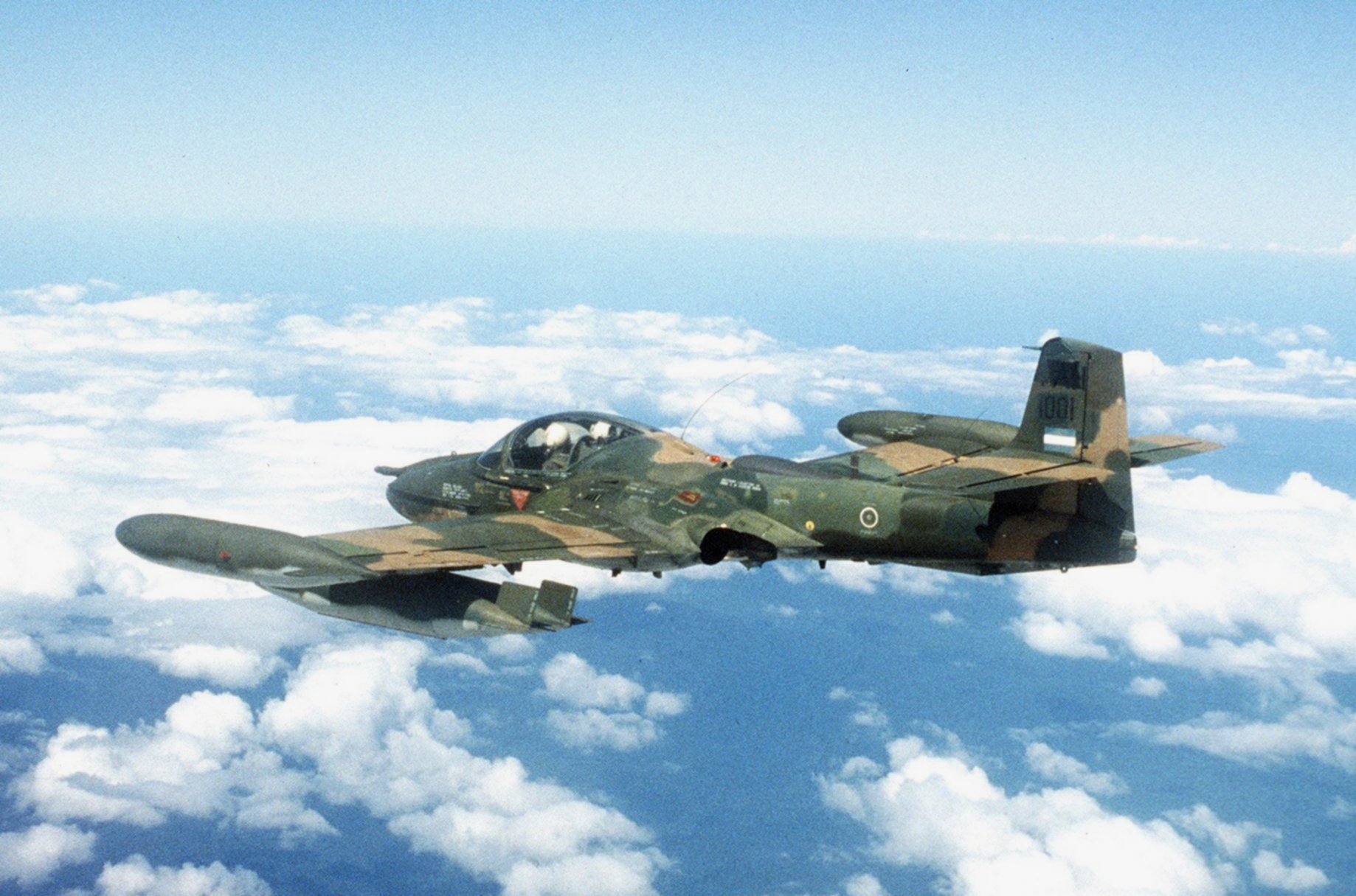
A Honduran Air Force A-37

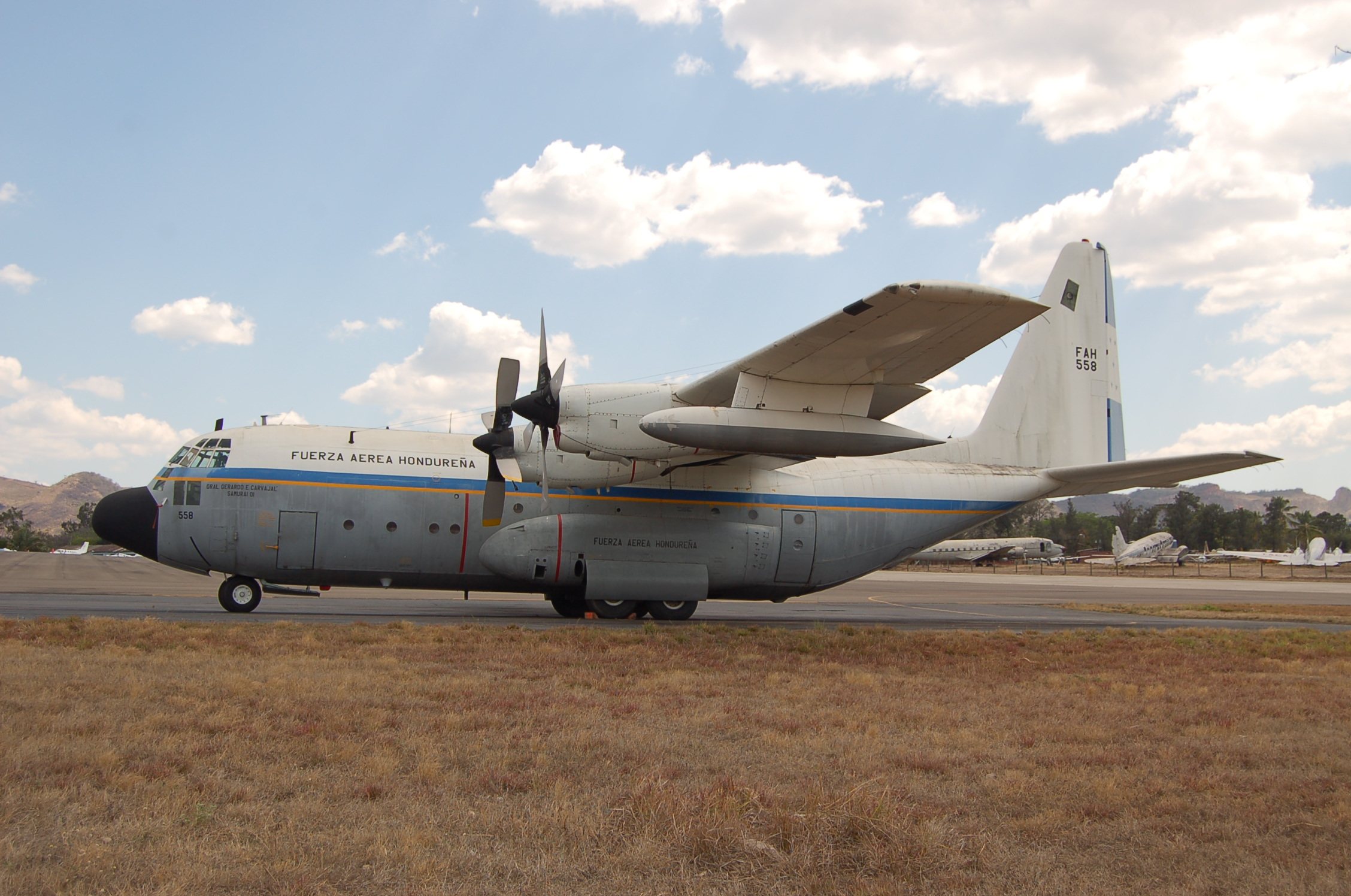
A Honduran C-130A

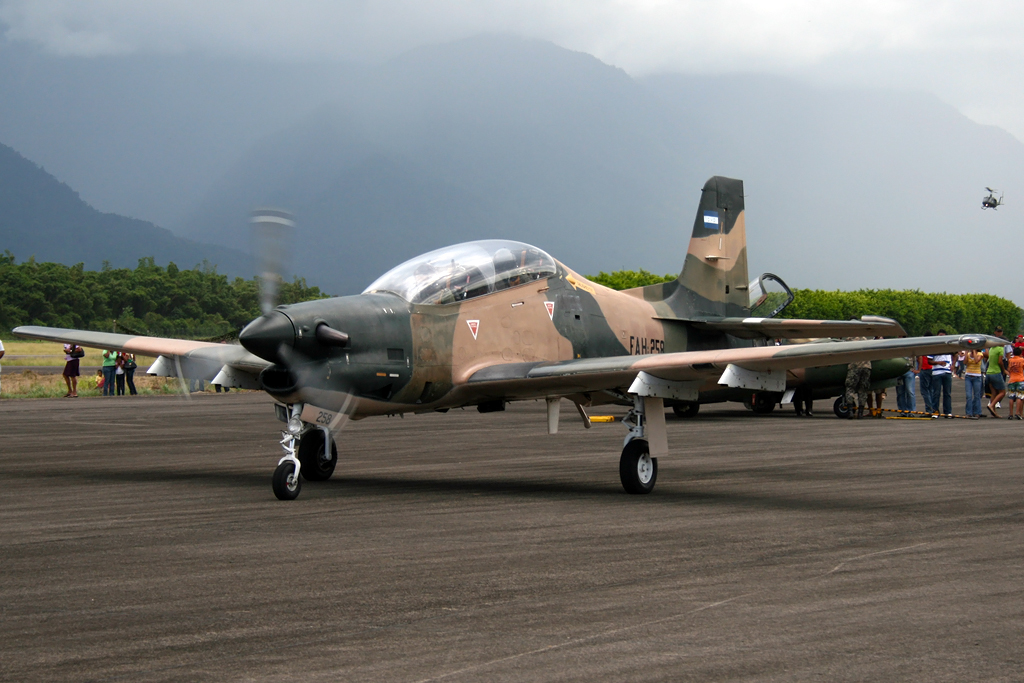
Embraer T-27 Tucano

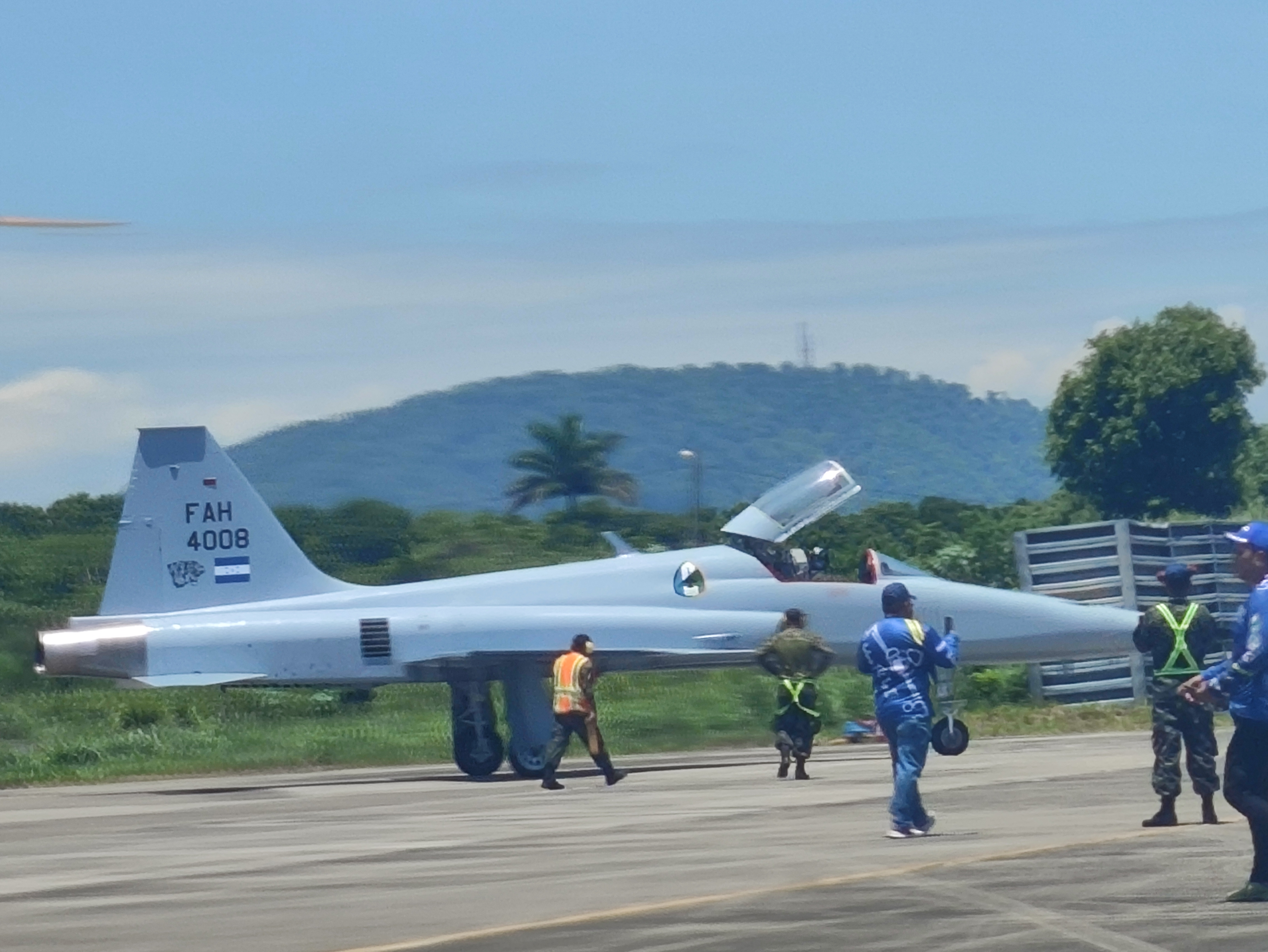
A Honduran Air Force Northrop F-5E Tiger.

=== Current inventory ===
Aircraft	Origin	Type	Variant	In service	Notes
Combat aircraft
Cessna A-37	United States	COIN / Light attack		9	
Northrop F-5	United States	Fighter	F-5E	9	1 in storage
Reconnaissance
Super King Air	United States	Surveillance	200	1	
Transport
C-130 Hercules	United States	Tactical airlifter	C-130A		
Cessna 208	United States	Transport / Utility	EX	5	
Piper PA-31	United States	Utility		1	
Piper PA-34	United States	Utility		1	
Turbo Commander	United States	Transport		3	
Let L-410 Turbolet	Czech Republic	Transport / Utility		1	
Helicopters
Bell 412	United States	Utility / VIP	412SP/EP	6	One aircraft for presidential use
Bell UH-1	United States	Utility	UH-1H	5	
Airbus H145	Germany	Utility	H145M	2	4 on order
MBB Bo 105	Germany	Utility		1	Flown for the Honduran Navy
Trainer aircraft
Northrop F-5	United States	Conversion trainer	F-5F	2	
EMB-312 Tucano	Brazil	Trainer	AT-27	8	
Maule	United States	Trainer	MX-7-182	6	

== Ranks ==
=== Commissioned officer ranks ===
The rank insignia of commissioned officers.

Rank group	General / flag officers		Senior officers			Junior officers
Honduran Air Force
Honduran Air Force	General de división	General de brigada	Coronel	Teniente coronel	Mayor	Capitán	Teniente	Subteniente

=== Other ranks ===
The rank insignia of non-commissioned officers and enlisted personnel.

Rank group	Senior NCOs			Junior NCOs	Enlisted
Honduran Air Force
Honduran Air Force	Sargento mayor técnico	Sargento primero técnico	Sargento segundo técnico	Cabo técnico	Aero técnico primera clase	Aero técnico básico

== Bibliography ==
- Hagedorn, Daniel P. "From Caudillos to COIN". Air Enthusiast, Thirty-one, July–November 1986. pp. 55–70. ISSN 0143-5450.
- Hagedorn, Daniel P. (September–October 1996). "Talkback". Air Enthusiast (65): 80. ISSN 0143-5450.
- Hoyle, Craig. "World Air Forces Directory". Flight International, Vol. 194, Number 5665, 4–10 December 2018. ISSN 0015-3710. pp. 32–60.
