= Maule M-5 =

American light aircraft

M-5
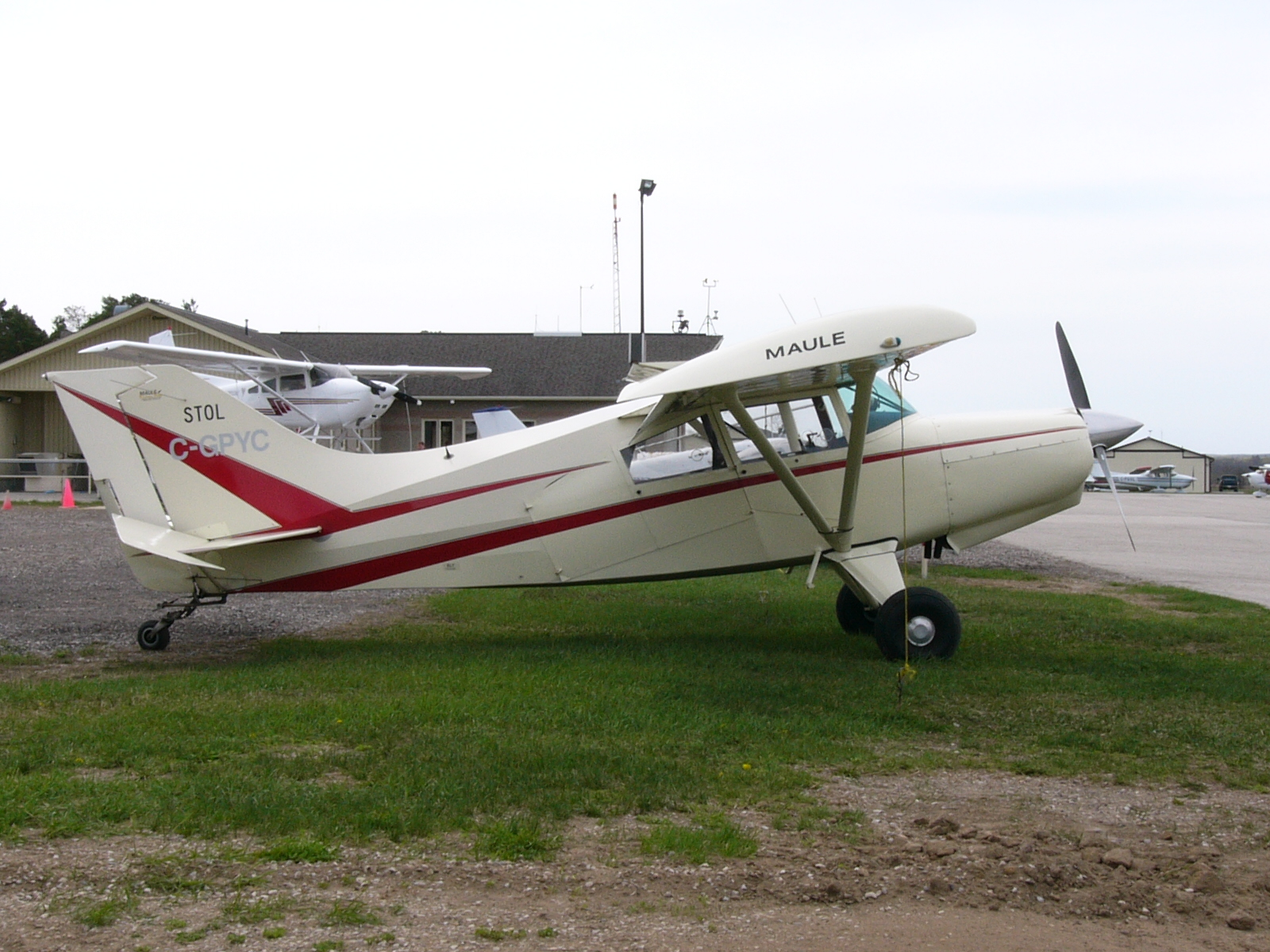
- Maule M-5-235C

General information
- Type: Four-seat cabin monoplane
- National origin: United States
- Manufacturer: Maule Aircraft Company
- Designer: Belford Maule
- Number built: over 855

History
- Manufactured: 1974-1983
- Introduction date: 1974
- First flight: 1971
- Developed from: Maule M-4

The Maule M-5 is an American four-seat cabin monoplane designed and built by the Maule Aircraft Company.

== Design and development ==
The M-5 was a development of the earlier Maule M-4 with improved STOL performance. It has a 30% increase in flap area and enlarged tail surfaces.

Two prototype M-5s flew in 1971, one powered by a 210-hp (157 kW) engine, the other with a 220-hp (164 kW) engine.

The M-5 is a steel-tube and fabric high-wing braced-monoplane with a cantilever tailplane with a single fin and rudder. It has a fixed-tailwheel landing gear and an enclosed cabin with two rows of side-by-side seating for a pilot and three passengers. The aircraft entered production in 1974 and was named the Strata Rocket and the Lunar Rocket. A generally similar M-6 Super Rocket was also developed with a 3-foot-longer (0.91 m) wingspan and more fuel capacity, smaller ailerons and larger flaps.

== Variants ==
M-5-180C
Initial production variant with a 180-horsepower (134 kW) Lycoming O-360-C1F engine, more than 94 built.
M-5-200
One aircraft modified with a 200-horsepower (149 kW) engine.
M-5-210C Strata Rocket
180C with a 210-horsepower (157 kW) Continental IO-360-D engine in a revised cowling, 206 built.
M-5-210TC Lunar Rocket
210C fitted with a turbocharged 210-horsepower (157 kW) Lycoming TO-360 engine, 10 built.
M-5-220C Lunar Rocket
210C fitted with a 220-horsepower (164 kW) Franklin 6A-350-C1 engine, 57 built.
M-5-235C Lunar Rocket
210C fitted with a 235-horsepower (175 kW) Lycoming O-540-J1A5D engine, more than 379 built.
M-6-235C Super Rocket
235C with a 3-foot-longer (0.91 m) wingspan and more fuel capacity, smaller ailerons and larger flaps, 136 built.

== Specifications (M-5-235C Lunar Rocket) ==
Data from Jane's All the World's Aircraft 1982–83

General characteristics

- Crew: 1
- Capacity: 3 passengers
- Length: 23 ft 6 in (7.16 m)
- Wingspan: 30 ft 10 in (9.40 m)
- Height: 6 ft 2 1/2 in (1.89 m)
- Wing area: 157.9 sq ft (14.67 m^{2})
- Aspect ratio: 6.02:1
- Airfoil: USA 35B (modified)
- Empty weight: 1,400 lb (635 kg)
- Gross weight: 2,300 lb (1,043 kg)
- Fuel capacity: 63 US gal (52 imp gal; 240 L)
- Powerplant: 1 × Lycoming O-540-J1A5D air-cooled flat-six piston engine, 235 hp (175 kW)
- Propellers: 2-bladed Hartzell constant-speed propeller, 6 ft 6 in (1.98 m) diameter

Performance

- Maximum speed: 172 mph (277 km/h, 149 kn)
- Cruise speed: 160 mph (260 km/h, 140 kn) (econ. cruise) CAS
- Range: 550 mi (890 km, 480 nmi) (max standard fuel)
- Service ceiling: 20,000 ft (6,100 m)
- Rate of climb: 1,350 ft/min (6.9 m/s)
