= Maule M-4 =

American light aircraft

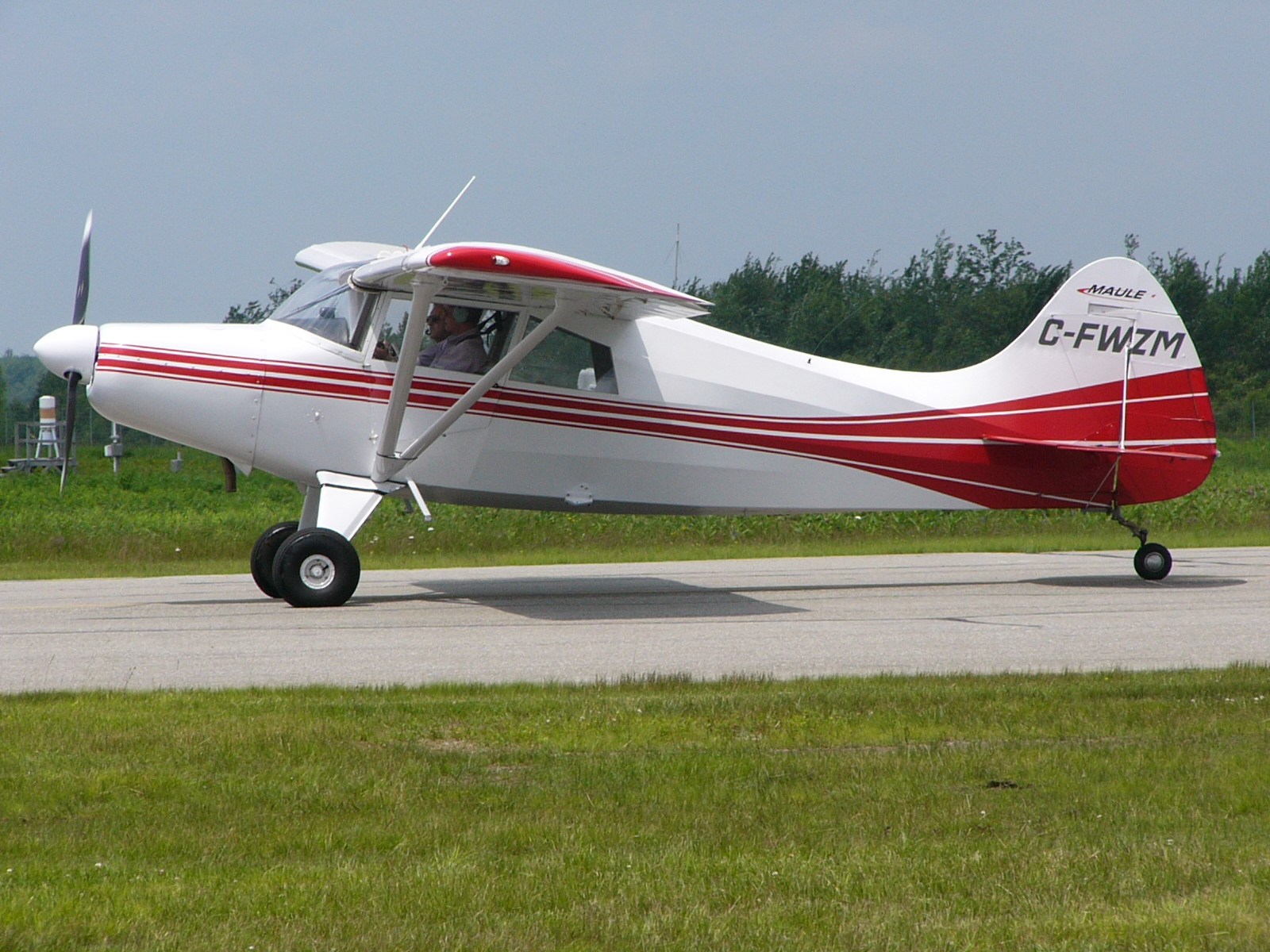
- Maule M-4-210C Rocket

General information
- Type: Four-seat cabin monoplane
- National origin: United States
- Manufacturer: Maule Aircraft Company
- Designer: Belford Maule
- Number built: 474

History
- Manufactured: 1963-1983
- Introduction date: 1961
- First flight: 1960
- Variant: Maule M-5

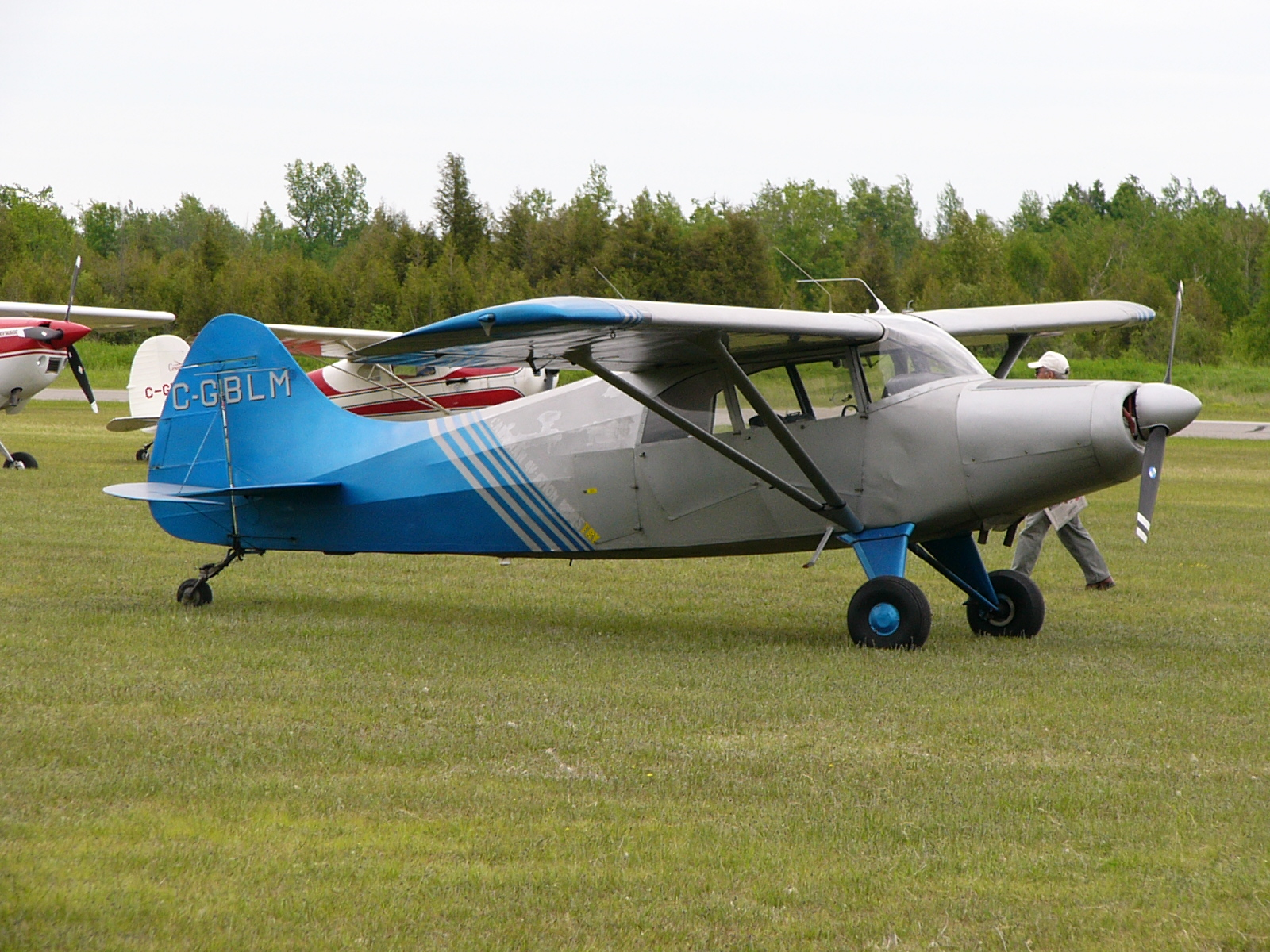
Maule M-4-210 Rocket

The Maule M-4 is an American four-seat cabin monoplane designed by Belford Maule and built by the Maule Aircraft Company.

== Design and development ==
The design of the M-4 was started in 1956 by Belford Maule and the prototype Bee Dee first flew in February 1957. Maule started the Maule Aircraft Company to develop and build the aircraft in Napoleon, Michigan as the Maule M-4. The first M-4 flew on September 8, 1960. The M-4 is a steel-tube and fabric high-wing braced-monoplane with a cantilever tailplane with a single fin and rudder. It has a fixed tailwheel landing gear, and the prototype was powered by a nose-mounted 145 hp (108 kW) Continental O-300 engine. It has an enclosed cabin with two rows of side-by-side seating for a pilot and three passengers. The prototype first flew on September 8, 1961 and production started in 1963. Other variants were introduced including the Rocket which is powered by a 210 hp (157 kW) Continental IO-360-A engine, a deluxe Franklin-powered M-4 Astro-Rocket and a Franklin-powered Rocket which is known as the M-4 Strata-Rocket.

A STOL variant of the Strata Rocket was developed as the Maule M-5 Lunar Rocket.

== Variants ==
Bee Dee
Prototype with a 145 hp (108 kW) Continental O-300-A piston engine, 11 built.
M-4 Jetasen
Production version of the earlier Maule Bee Dee with 145 hp (108 kW) Continental O-300A piston engine, 94 built.
M-4C Jetasen
Fitted with a cargo door, 11 built.
M-4S
Upgraded equipment, three built.
M-4T
Dual-control trainer without rear-seats or rear-entry door, three built.
M-4-180C Astro-Rocket
M-4C with a 180 hp (130 kW) Franklin 6A-335-1A engine, seven built.
M-4-210 Rocket
M-4 with a 210 hp (160 kW) Continental IO-360-A engine, 45 built.
M-4-210C Rocket
M-4-210 fitted with a cargo door, 117 built.
M-4-220C Strata Rocket
M-4C with a 220 hp (160 kW) Franklin 6A-350-C1 engine, 190 built.
M-4-220S
M-4S with a 220 hp (160 kW) Franklin 6A-350-C1 engine, one built.
SADASA Cuahtemoc M-1
License-built M-4 with a 180 hp (130 kW) Lycoming O-360 engine, three built.

== Specifications (M-4-220C Strata Rocket) ==
Data from Jane's All the World's Aircraft 1971–72

General characteristics

- Crew: 1
- Capacity: 3 passengers
- Length: 22 ft 0 in (6.71 m)
- Wingspan: 30 ft 10 in (9.40 m) (cambered wingtips)
- Height: 6 ft 2 1/2 in (1.892 m)
- Wing area: 152.5 sq ft (14.17 m^{2})
- Airfoil: USA 35B (modified)
- Empty weight: 1,250 lb (567 kg)
- Max takeoff weight: 2,300 lb (1,043 kg)
- Fuel capacity: 42 US gal (35 imp gal; 160 L)
- Powerplant: 1 × Franklin 6A-350-C1 air-cooled 6-cylinder horizontally-opposed engine, 220 hp (160 kW)
- Propellers: 2-bladed

Performance

- Cruise speed: 180 mph (290 km/h, 160 kn) (at 75% power)
- Stall speed: 40 mph (64 km/h, 35 kn) (full flaps)
- Range: 680 mi (1,090 km, 590 nmi)
- Service ceiling: 19,000 ft (5,800 m)
  Absolute ceiling: 21,000 ft (6,400 m)
- Rate of climb: 1,250 ft/min (6.4 m/s)
- Take-off run to 50 ft (15 m): 600 ft (180 m)
- Landing run from 50 ft (15 m): 600 ft (180 m)

== See also ==
Aircraft of comparable role, configuration, and era

- Piper Colt
- Piper PA-16 Clipper
