= Coral Springs Center for the Arts =

Theatre and art museum in Florida, US

Coordinates: 26.2664°N 80.2650°W

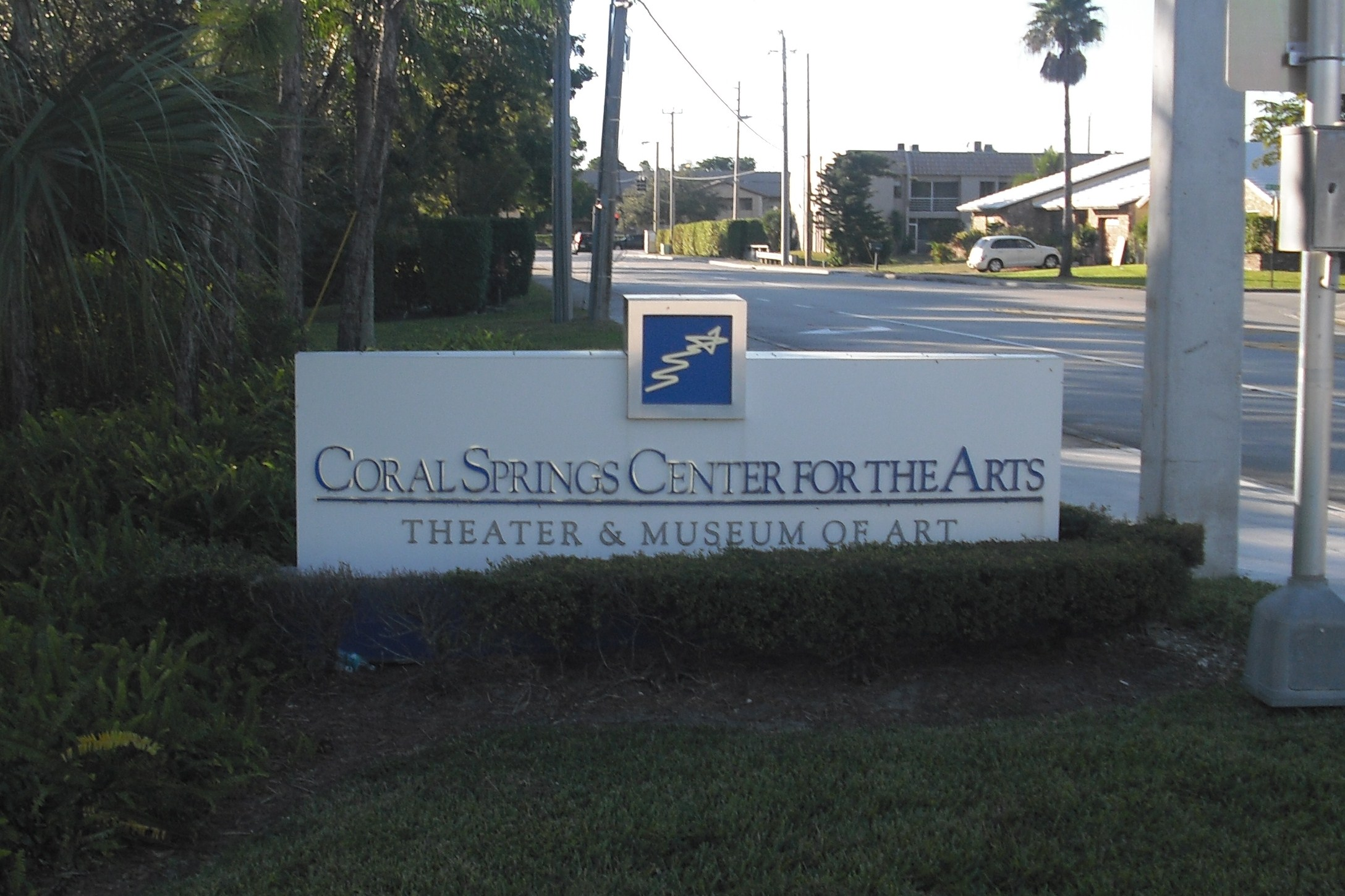
Coral Springs Center for the Performing and Visual Arts

The Coral Springs Center for the Arts is a modern style 1,471-seat theatre and art museum in Coral Springs, Florida. The facilities include a theater which hosts broadway shows and their home studio, Next Stop Broadway. The studio also hosts many audition workshops. The facility also hosts the Coral Springs Museum of Art, which features changing exhibits of works by nationally-recognized artists and Florida artists.

== History ==
During a community visioning exercise in the City of Coral Springs in the early 1980s, the participants indicated that there was a need for a community center to host meetings and events, as well as serve as a hub for recreational activities. As part of a large general obligation bond issuance for parks and a public safety facility, $8 million was allocated for the community center, which was expanded to include a gymnasium, which had also been identified as a need.

During the construction, many consultants and engineers worked on the facility, which was designed by Donald Singer, a local architect of international stature.

Due to space limitations, a novel solution to the need for basketball courts and auditorium space was developed by combining the two. The two-court gymnasium opened directly into the theater, with portable seating used to service both. When facing south, the bleachers served as the mezzanine of the theater, when facing north as grandstands for the gymnasium.

During the three-year construction, cost-overruns totaling another $1 million and several contractor bankruptcies forced many “value engineering” decisions to be made, including reducing the stage and fly tower space, reducing the number of classrooms, and downgrading material specifications. The basic envelope of the building however, remained the same.

The facility opened in 1989 as a division of the Parks & Recreation Department. Before a year had passed it had become evident that although the building had been designed primarily for recreation activities, the demand for cultural activities far outweighed the level of use the facility was generating.

By 1990, the City Centre (as it was then called) was made into its own department separate from Parks & Recreation and theater professionals were recruited to run the facility. In 1994 the City committed funds generated from revenue bonds to fix the acoustical and space problems in the facility. At the same time, a wealthy artist was courting the City to partner in building an art museum. The two projects were a natural match and a total of $4.5 million ($1.5 million from the patron) was allocated to the project.

The renovated facility reopened in 1996 and the complex was renamed The Coral Springs Center for the Arts.

== Coral Springs Museum of Art ==
Opened in 1997, the focus of the Coral Springs Museum of Art is on highlighting present day, nationally-recognized artists and Florida artists who create traditional, Modern, Postmodern and digital art. Each year the museum also hosts an exhibition by members of the Coral Springs Artist Guild.

Recent exhibitions have included works by Pablo Cano, Scott Draves, Clyde Butcher, William Glackens and Charles Mills.

On May 9, 2015 the Coral Springs Museum of Art hosted its inaugural comic book convention, Comics Fest Coral Springs. The event featured panels on costuming, comics creation, a Quick Draw competition, and cartooning lessons, as well as vendors and an Artist Alley.

The Coral Springs Museum of Art offers art instruction in ceramics, painting techniques, illustration, and mixed media to age levels ranging from child to adult, and operates an art camp program during the summer.
