= Robert C. Lautman =

American photographer (1923–2009)

Robert Clayton Lautman (November 8, 1923 - October 20, 2009) was an American architectural photographer.

Born in Butte, Montana, his first photographs were made with a box camera for his junior high school yearbook. After attending Montana State University in Bozeman for a year, he traveled east, working briefly as a copyboy for The Washington Post, then enlisting in the Army during World War II.

Lautman became a combat photographer in the Army, and volunteered to parachute onto Corregidor. Despite having never previously made a jump, he landed safely, photographed combat scenes, and returned under fire to deliver his film to a waiting PT boat.

Lautman was awarded the first of two Bronze Stars for his work on Corregidor. The second award was with the Army Rangers, who conducted a daring raid of the Cabanatuan prison camp in the Philippines, liberating 513 prisoners of the Japanese.

Following the war, Lautman worked in several photo studios in New York, and in 1948 established his own photography business in Washington, DC. By 1954, he was carrying as standard equipment "a lineman's pole climbers and safety belt for shooting from telephone poles and trees". In 1996, he was still going out on a limb, dangling from the end of a construction cranes at the National Cathedral to get the right angle.

The House Committee on Un-American Activities called Lautman to testify in 1954. He was among 11 residents of the Washington, DC, area that refused to answer the committee's questions that year on constitutional grounds. That experience did not seem to harm his career, as many modernist architects soon became loyal clients.

In the 1960s, Maryland developer James Rouse hired Lautman to photograph many of his projects across the United States. His national reputation began to grow, and his work began to appear in magazines such as Home and Garden, House Beautiful, Architectural Digest, Elle, Smithsonian and others.

== An eye for detail ==
When asked, how do you capture the essence of an architectural detail in a photograph? “The lighting is everything. Somebody (I'm not sure who; it wasn't me) once said, ‘Architectural photography consists of two things: knowing where to stand and knowing what time to stand there.' That, of course, has to do with light. The rest is just technology.”

Lautman emphasized that architectural photography relies on attention to minor details, nothing that small elements like ironed tablecloth or a smoothed bedspread heavily impact the final image.

The American Institute of Architects said in 1973, "The subtle play of light and shadow in his photographs captures and complements the nuances of architectural design," upon awarding him its highest honor, the Gold Medal for Photography.

== Thomas Jefferson's Monticello ==
In collaboration with Ken Burns for his documentary film series on Thomas Jefferson, Lautman created Thomas Jefferson's Monticello - A Photographic Portrait, a collection of photographs that portray Jefferson's Palladian masterpiece near Charlottesville, Virginia, as Jefferson might have photographed it himself, with his own refined intellectual and aesthetic vision. They were made utilizing a unique mid-nineteenth century method, shooting the spaces with a large format camera, using only natural light. The images were printed with a platinum-palladium process on hand-coated paper resulting in photographs that display a never-before-seen radiant atmosphere.

== The National Cathedral ==
Over a 40-year span, Lautman documented the construction of the National Cathedral in Washington, DC. Washington Post architecture critic Benjamin Forgey wrote in 1996, "It is a pleasure to study such photographs at length. Many photographers have stood in more or less the same place [in the cathedral's nave] to capture a dramatic, long view of this interior. Yet so clear are the repeated piers, ribs, trefoils and triforium arches in this photograph that it makes the point better than any other picture I have seen -- the whole is greater than the parts, but the parts themselves are great."

== The National Building Museum ==
Photographing pro bono the old Pension Building, he helped save that structure and it later became the National Building Museum. His archive of 70,000 prints, transparencies and negatives was donated to the museum.
