= Samy Abu Zaid =

Egyptian football player (1979–2009)

Sami Abou-Zeid
Personal information
- Full name: Sami Abou-Zeid
- Date of birth: January 1, 1979
- Place of birth: Egypt
- Date of death: October 12, 2009 (aged 30)
- Position: Forward

Team information
- Current team: Asyut Petroleum
- Number: 10

Senior career*
Years	Team	Apps	(Gls)
	Asyut Cement	??	(?)
	Asyut Petroleum	??	(?)
- * Club domestic league appearances and goals

Sami Abou-Zeid (January 1, 1979 – October 12, 2009), or Samy Abu Zaid, was a professional Egyptian footballer. He played for Asyut Cement before joining Asyut Petroleum later in his career. Sami died in a car accident on 12 October 2009 while on the way to training. He was accompanied by chief medic Khaled Anwar. Anwar survived the crash with a few knocks.
