= June Maule =

June De Etta Maule
- Born: February 1, 1917
- Died: October 29, 2009 (aged 92)
- Known for: Maule Air
- Spouse: Belford Maule

June De Etta Maule (February 1, 1917 – October 29, 2009) was an American businesswoman. Maule was the owner and manager of Maule Air, a manufacturer of light, single-engined STOL (Short Take-Off and Landing) aircraft headquartered in Moultrie, Georgia.

== Life ==
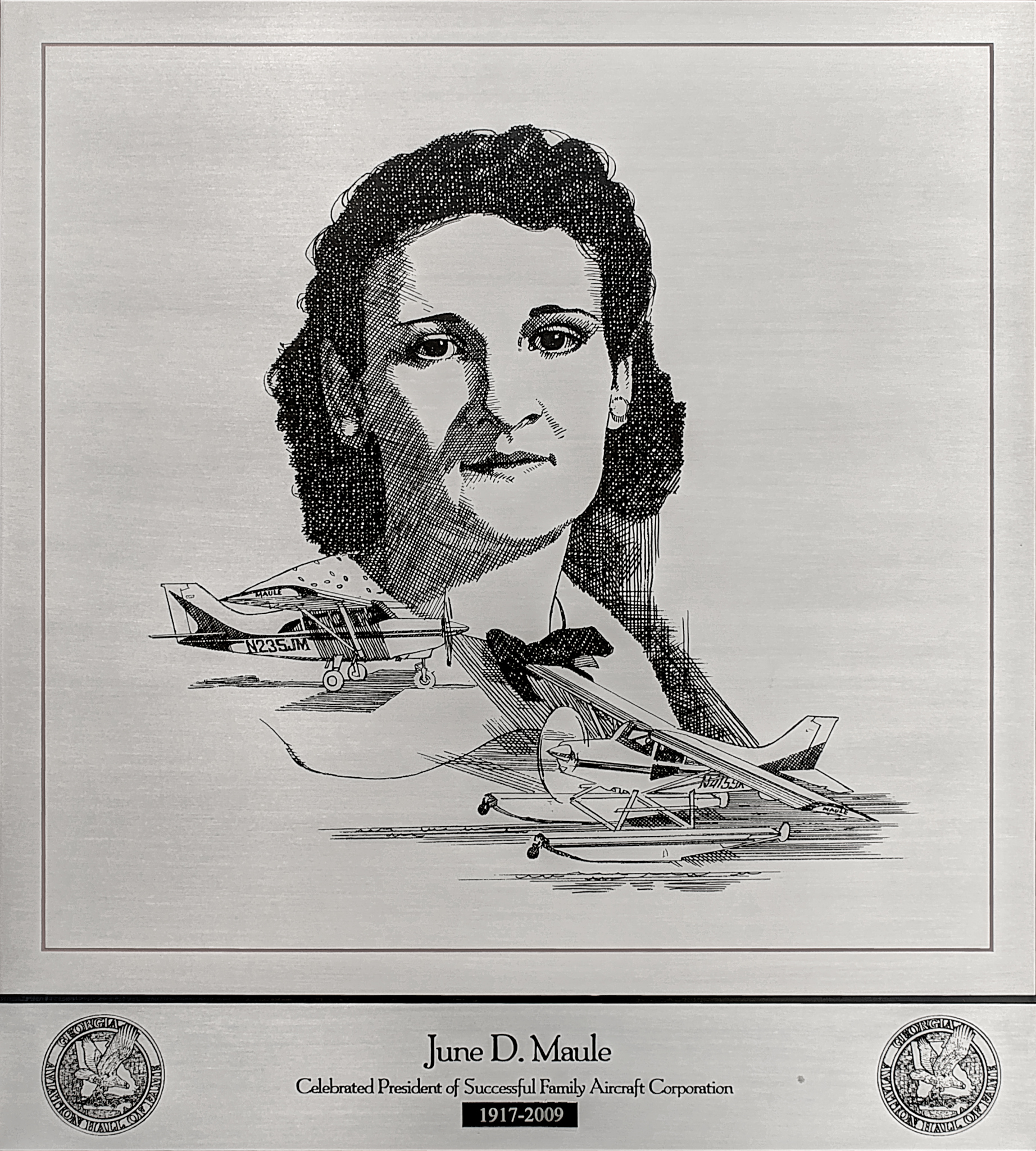
Plaque of Maule at the Georgia Aviation Hall of Fame

June Aderhold was born in Jersey Shore, Pennsylvania. She married her husband, Belford D. Maule (1911–1995), in 1934. The couple remained together both in marriage and as business partners until his death in 1995.

June Maule took an active role in her husband's company, helping to both sell and develop Maule Air's aircraft. The couple jointly ran the day-to-day operations of the company. She took over the company after her husband's death and remained actively involved with the factory and its productions until her death in 2009.

In a 2000 interview with Aviation for Women Magazine, Maule explained her involvement with her company and the aviation industry, "I've done everything involved in building an airplane except welding. I've sewn the upholstery, helped with covering, run lathes, and even helped with the forming of windshields when we still made them in the factory. That's how Mr. Maule and I did it. We worked together."

During her lifetime, Maule was inducted into the Pioneer Hall of Fame, which was created in 1992 to honor women who have made significant contributions to the aviation industry though innovation or action. Besides Maule, other past inductees to the Pioneer Hall of Fame have included Amelia Earhart, Nadine Jeppesen, Audrey Poberezny, Jeana Yeager, Anne Morrow Lindbergh, Patty Wagstaff and Olive Ann Beech.

Additionally, Maule was the recipient of the Katharine Wright Memorial Award in 1993. She was also inducted into the Women in Aviation International Hall of Fame, the Georgia Aviation Hall of Fame and the Michigan Aviation Hall of Fame. Maule was the named the Colquitt County Woman of the Year in 2000. Her funeral was held at Lifespring Community Church in Moultrie, Georgia, and she was interred at Pinecrest Memory Gardens cemetery.

Maule died from a short illness on October 29, 2009, at the age of 92. Her son, Gary Maule, 57, died from leukemia on the same day as his mother. She was survived by four other children. Most of her children were employed with Maule Air.
