= Maciej Rybiński (journalist) =

Polish journalist, publicist, satirist and writer

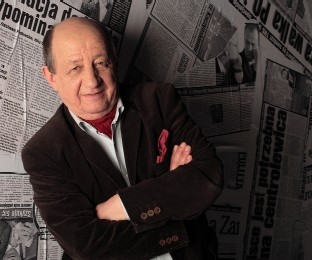

Maciej Rybiński (5 March 1945 – 22 October 2009) was a Polish journalist, publicist, satirist and writer.
