= Ron Finley (American football) =

American football coach (1933–2009)

Biographical details
- Born: June 27, 1933; Louisville, Kentucky, U.S.
- Died: October 5, 2009 (aged 76); Greensburg, Kentucky, U.S.

Coaching career (HC unless noted)
- 1988–2002: Campbellsville

Head coaching record
- Overall: 78–81–1
- Bowls: 0–1
- Tournaments: 1–1 (NAIA playoffs)

Accomplishments and honors

Championships
- 2 MSC (1992, 1997)

Ron Finley (June 27, 1933 – October 5, 2009) was an American football coach. He was the first head football coach at Campbellsville University in Campbellsville, Kentucky, serving from 1988 to 2002 and compiling a record of 78–81–1.

Finley died on October 5, 2009, at the age of 76.

== Head coaching record ==
Year	Team	Overall	Conference	Standing	Bowl/playoffs
Campbellsville Tigers (Mid-South Conference) (1988–2002)
1988	Campbellsville	0–11	0–5	6th	
1989	Campbellsville	2–7–1	2–3–1	5th	
1990	Campbellsville	8–2	3–2	3rd	
1991	Campbellsville	9–2	4–2	2nd	
1992	Campbellsville	7–3	4–1	T–1st	
1993	Campbellsville	2–9	1–4	6th	
1994	Campbellsville	4–7	1–4	T–5th	
1995	Campbellsville	3–8	2–6	T–7th	
1996	Campbellsville	6–4	4–3	3rd	
1997	Campbellsville	7–3	5–1	T–1st	
1998	Campbellsville	7–4	4–3	T–4th	
1999	Campbellsville	2–8	2–5	T–5th	
2000	Campbellsville	7–4	5–2	3rd	L KWTO Bowl
2001	Campbellsville	10–3	5–2	2nd	L NAIA Quarterfinal
2002	Campbellsville	4–6	3–5	T–6th	
Campbellsville:		78–81–1	45–48–1		
Total:		78–81–1			
