= Pedro E. Zadunaisky =

Argentine astronomer and mathematician

Pedro Elías Zadunaisky (December 10, 1917 – October 7, 2009) was an Argentine astronomer and mathematician who plotted the orbit of Saturn's most-distant moon, Phoebe, as well as several comets including Halley's Comet, and various satellites including Explorer I.

Zadunaisky was born in Rosario, Santa Fe. He was once a senior astronomer and a mathematician at the Smithsonian Astrophysical Observatory and at NASA's Goddard Space Flight Center. 4617 Zadunaisky is an asteroid named in his honor. He died on October 7, 2009, at the age of 91. He wrote the book "A Guide to Celestial Mechanics" in 1961.
