= Charles Mills (artist, born 1920) =

African-American artist (1920–2009)

- Born: Charles Norman Mills; December 14, 1920; New York City, U.S.
- Died: October 20, 2009 (aged 88); Pembroke Pines, Florida, U.S.
- Occupation: Artist
- Spouse: Thelma
- Children: 2

Charles Norman Mills (December 14, 1920 – October 20, 2009) was an African-American artist whose paintings appeared on canvas and as murals on neighborhood walls, focusing on events in African-American history and culture. His work Wall of History, a mural depicting centuries of African-American history, located at the entrance to downtown Fort Lauderdale's Sistrunk Boulevard, has been called his greatest achievement.

Mills was born on December 14, 1920, in New York City and grew up in Harlem. He attended an arts high school in Manhattan. As a youth, Mills learned about his roots through his frequent visits to a collection of books on African-American culture and history located on the second floor of a building on 135th Street, a collection that was later placed in the Schomburg Center for Research in Black Culture.

Mills served in the United States Army and after completing his military service worked as a medical illustrator at the VA Medical Center in Brooklyn. This was a position that his daughter described as having "brought out the art in him" and Mills would go on to spend two decades designing and illustrating medical books. He started designing fine art, after taking instruction at The Career School of Commercial Illustration in New York and at the Brooklyn Museum, with many of his works shown in collections and galleries in New York City.

He moved to South Florida in 1985, settling in Fort Lauderdale. He taught at the Coral Springs Museum of Art, continued painting and had his works shown in area galleries and museums. His mural at the entrance to Sistrunk Boulevard in his adopted home town, commissioned by the City of Fort Lauderdale, have been considered his greatest work, telling the story of the African-American experience from slavery to modern times. In 2009, the Jim Moran Foundation honored him as an African-American Achiever for his six decades of painting and his focus on the African-American experience.

Mills died at age 88 on October 20, 2009, at a hospice in Pembroke Pines, Florida. He was survived by his wife, Thelma, as well as by two daughters Renee Chester and Denise Collins, five grandchildren and five great-grandchildren.
