= Winai Senniam =

Thai politician (1958–2009)

- วินัย เสนเนียม
- Born: August 22, 1958; Ranot, Songkhla, Thailand
- Died: October 20, 2009 (aged 51); Bangkok, Thailand
- Education: Ramkhamhaeng University; NIDA
- Occupation: Politician
- Years active: 1992–2009
- Political party: Democrat Party

Winai Senniam (Thai: วินัย เสนเนียม; August 22, 1958 - October 20, 2009) was a Thai politician and parliamentarian who served in the House of Representatives of Thailand. Winai was a member of the Democrat Party of Thailand.

Winai was the younger brother of the Deputy Interior Minister, Thaworn Senniam. He obtained a bachelor's degree in law from Ramkhamhaeng University. He also received a master's degree from the National Institute of Development Administration.

He served as the deputy chairman of Phayathai District Council from 1985 until 1989. He was first elected as an MP representing Songkhla in southern Thailand beginning in 1992. He remained a Democratic member of parliament for Songkhla until his death in 2009.

Winai died at 11am on October 20, 2009, at the National Cancer Institute in Bangkok, Thailand, at the age of 51. He had been battling liver and colon cancer for the last three years of his life.

Winai's body was moved on October 22, 2009, to the Kho Hong temple in Songkhla's Hat Yai district for his funeral.
