= Jean Sage =

French Formula One sporting director

Jean Sage (c. 1941 – 8 October 2009) was the sporting director at the French Formula One team Renault between 1977 and 1985.

== Early life and career ==
Sage came from a wealthy background and was a collector of Ferraris, making his competition debut at the age of just 20 years old co-driving a Ferrari 250 with André Simon. He also co-drove for Jean-Pierre Hanrioud and Gérard Larrousse while competing in Formula Three through the early 1960s. Then in 1973 along with Larrousse and Paul Archambeaud, they established the Écurie Elf team Switzerland. Archambeaud was a Swiss Mercedes-Benz dealer at the time. They began work building sportscars, but soon switched focus to the European Formula Two Championship series where they guided Jean-Pierre Jabouille to the 1976 championship.

== Renault F1 ==
When Larrousse was recruited by Renault, he hired Sage to run the newly forming F1 team in 1977. He oversaw the running of the team right from its debut at the 1977 British Grand Prix, through the first win at the 1979 French Grand Prix, the glory years of Alain Prost and René Arnoux—when the French squad was fought for the World Championships in 1982 and 1983—and its withdrawal at the end of the 1985 season. Sage stayed with Renault until the end of 1987, when it stopped supplying its turbo engines to other teams.

During qualifying for the 1986 Monaco Grand Prix, Sage was run over by the Ferrari of Stefan Johansson in the pitlane in an incident that was caught on TV cameras.

== Later life ==
After Renault, Sage went to manage the running of Ferrari F40's in the IMSA GT series through 1989 and 1990 with even Jean Alesi racing for the team. Into his later life he remained an active Ferrari collector and competitor in classic racing events, before his death on 8 October 2009.
