= Ian Hagemoen =

Canadian football player

Profile
- Position: Centre

Personal information
- Born: December 4, 1940; Wells, British Columbia
- Died: c. October 17, 2009 (aged 68); Vancouver, British Columbia
- Listed height: 6 ft 2 in (1.88 m)
- Listed weight: 235 lb (107 kg)

Career history
- 1962–1964: BC Lions
- 1964: Edmonton Eskimos
- 1965: Saskatchewan Roughriders

Awards and highlights
- Grey Cup champion (1964)

Ian Roger Hagemoen (December 4, 1940 – c. October 17, 2009) was a Canadian professional football player who played for the BC Lions, Edmonton Eskimos and Saskatchewan Roughriders. He won the Grey Cup with the Lions in 1964. His death was announced on October 17, 2009.
