= Maule Air =

American aircraft manufacturer

- Company type: Private
- Industry: Aviation
- Founded: 1941
- Headquarters: Moultrie, Georgia, U.S.
- Products: Aircraft
- Number of employees: 36
- Website: www.mauleairinc.com

Maule Air, Inc. is a manufacturer of light, single-engined, short take-off and landing (STOL) aircraft, based in Moultrie, Georgia, U.S. The company delivered 2,500 aircraft in its first 50 years of business.

== History ==
Belford D. Maule (1911–1995) designed his first aircraft, the M-1 starting at age 19. He founded the company Mechanical Products Co. in Napoleon, Michigan to market his own starter design. In 1941 the B.D. Maule Co. was founded, and Maule produced tailwheels and fabric testers. In 1953 he began design work, and started aircraft production with the "Bee-Dee" M-4 in 1957.

The company is a family-owned enterprise. Its owner, June Maule, widow of B. D. Maule, remained directly involved with factory production until her death in 2009 at the age of 92.

== Products ==
The aircraft produced by Maule Air are tube-and-fabric designs and are popular with bush pilots thanks to their very low stall speed, tundra tires and oleo strut landing gear. Most Maules are built with tailwheel or amphibious configurations, although the newer MXT models have tricycle gear.

=== Aircraft models ===
Model	Wingspan	Engine	Gross weight	V_{so}	V_{LD}
M4-210	29'8"	210 HP Continental	2300 lbs	28 mph	145 mph
M4-220	29'8"	220 HP Franklin	2300 lbs	28 mph	145 mph
M-5-180C	30'10"	180 HP Lycoming Carb	2400 lbs	38 mph	135 mph
M-5-200C	30'10"	200 HP Lycoming Injected	2500 lbs	38 mph	140 mph
M-5-210TC	30'10"	210 HP Lycoming Turbo	2500 lbs	38 mph	196 mph
M-5-210C	30'10"	210 HP Continental Injected	2500 lbs	38 mph	145 mph
M-5-235C	30'10"	235 HP Lycoming carb	2500 lbs	38 mph	158 mph
M-5-235C	30'10"	235 HP Lycoming injected	2500 lbs	39 mph	158 mph
M-6-235	32' 11"	235 HP Lycoming O-540-J1A5D	2500 lbs	35 mph	160 mph
M-6-235	32' 11"	235 HP Lycoming IO-540-W1A5D	2500 lbs	35 mph	160 mph
M-7	33' 6"	235 HP Lycoming IO-540-W	2500 lbs	40 mph	158 mph
M-9-235	32' 11"	235 HP Lycoming O-540-B4B5	2800 lbs	46 mph	158 mph
M-9-235	32' 11"	235 HP Lycoming IO-540-W1A5	2800 lbs	46 mph	158 mph
M-9-260	32' 11"	260 HP Lycoming IO-540-V4A5	2800 lbs	46 mph	162 mph

== Gallery ==
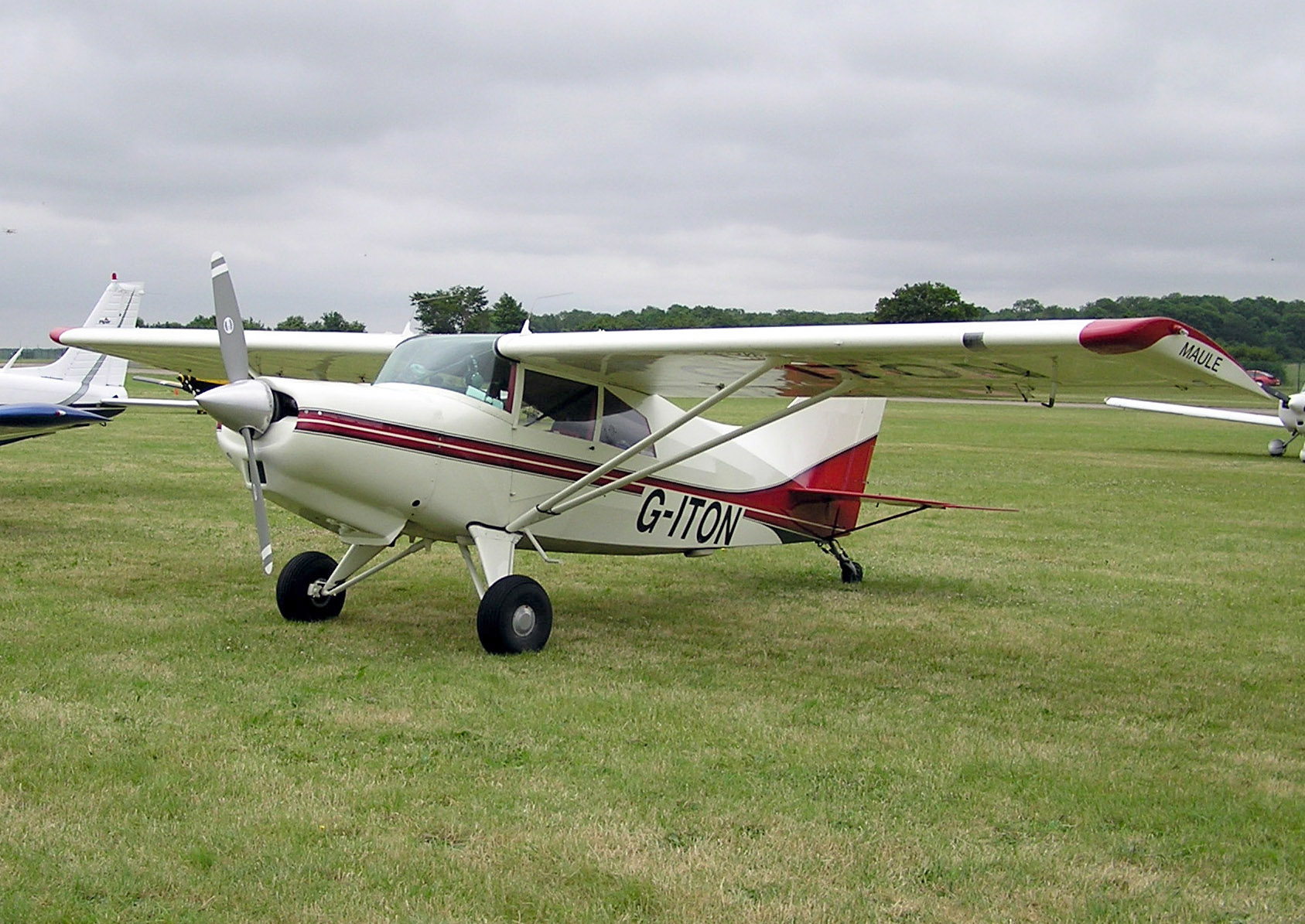
Maule MX-7-235 Super Rocket, built 1987

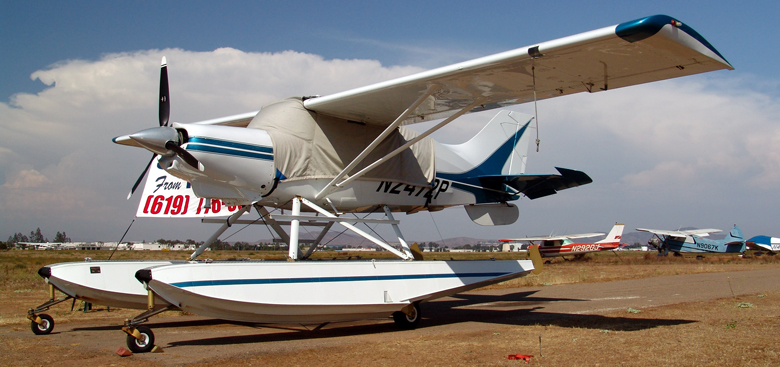
A Maule amphibian

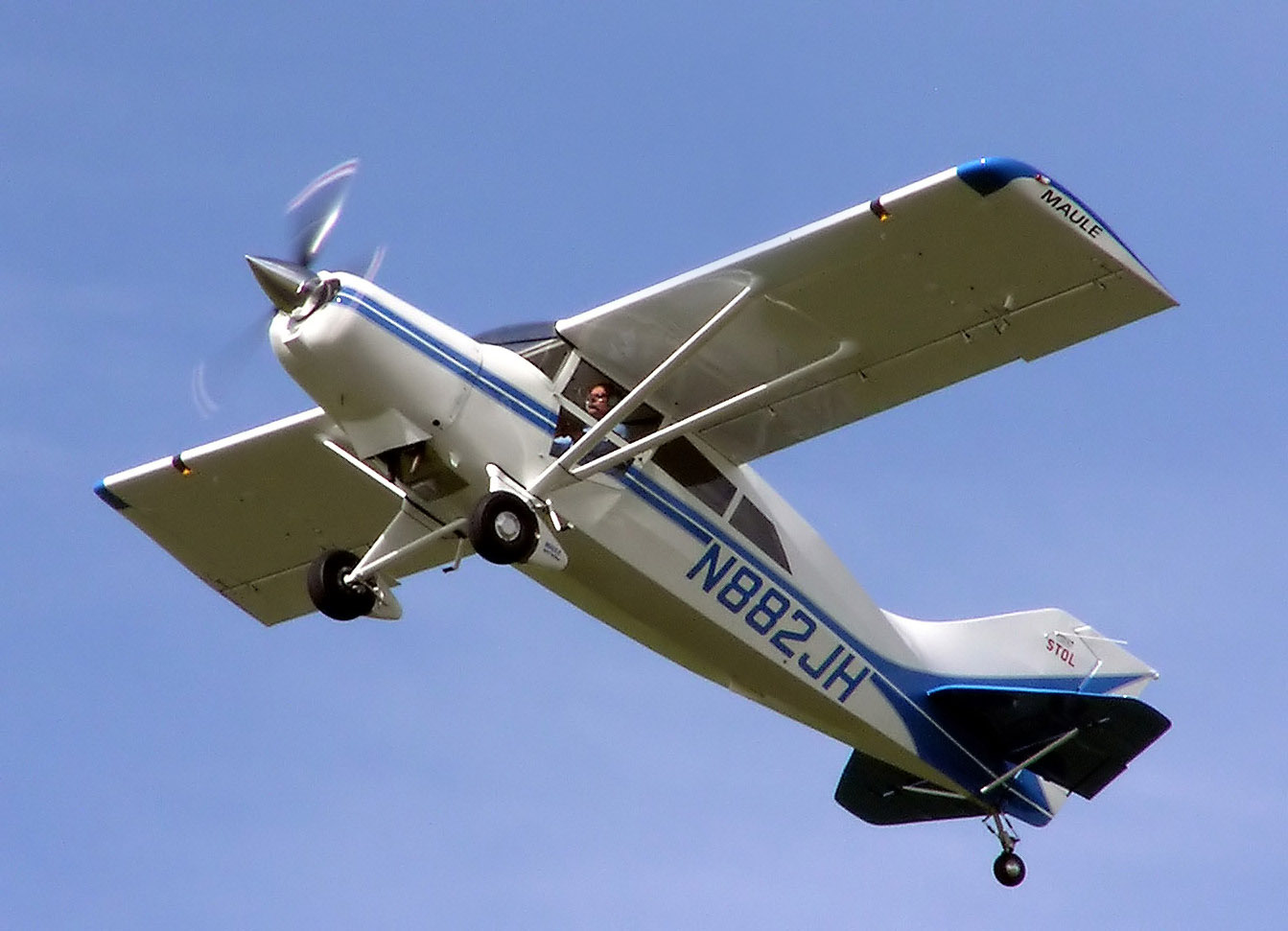
Maule M7-235B Super Rocket, built 1999
