= Hugh Dinwiddy =

English cricketer and educator

Personal information
- Full name: Hugh Pochin Dinwiddy
- Born: 16 October 1912; Kensington, London
- Died: 31 October 2009 (aged 97); Bognor Regis, West Sussex
- Batting: Right-handed
- Bowling: Legbreak, googly

Domestic team information
- Years: Team
- 1933–1935: Cambridge University
- 1933–1935: Kent

Career statistics
Competition	First-class
Matches	15
Runs scored	258
Batting average	12.28
100s/50s	0/0
Top score	45
Balls bowled	36
Wickets	0
Bowling average	–
5 wickets in innings	–
10 wickets in match	–
Best bowling	–
Catches/stumpings	9/–
- Source: CricInfo, 3 November 2009

Hugh Pochin Dinwiddy, OBE (16 October 1912 – 31 October 2009) was an English cricketer, who played first-class cricket for Kent County Cricket Club and Cambridge University Cricket Club between 1933 and 1935. He was the last man alive to play first-class cricket against both Jack Hobbs (whilst playing for Kent) and Donald Bradman (representing Cambridge University). He made his first-class cricket debut for Kent in 1933 against Worcestershire.

== Life ==
Dinwiddy was the son of Major C. H. Dinwiddy. He captained both the Cricket XI and the First XV at Radley College in 1931, and went up to Pembroke College, Cambridge in 1932. At Cambridge Dinwiddy also won a Blue for rugby and played for Harlequins, being trialed for England in 1936.

After graduation Dinwiddy taught English and rugby at Ampleforth College until the outbreak of the Second World War, when he enlisted in the Royal Navy.

In 1947 he married Yvonne Marie Catterall.

In 1956, at the instigation of Paul Foster, Dinwiddy moved to Uganda to teach literature and creative writing at Makerere College in Kampala, a constituent part of the University College of East Africa, soon to become the University of East Africa (and later Makerere University). He went on to serve as the Dean of the college.

He returned to England in 1970, and was made an Officer of the Order of the British Empire (OBE) in the 1971 New Year Honours for his work in Uganda. He lived at Bognor Regis and worked as an adult education teacher and an occasional lecturer on African affairs for Southampton University, Sussex University and the School of Oriental and African Studies.

== Works ==
- Uganda's Relations with Britain from 1971–1976 (1987).

== Bibliography ==
- Carlaw, Derek (2020). Kent County Cricketers, A to Z: Part Two: 1919–1939 (PDF). Cardiff: ACS.
