= Mike McQueen (journalist) =

American journalist

Mike McQueen (c. 1957 – October 25, 2009) was an American journalist who served as the Associated Press bureau chief for Louisiana and Mississippi.

McQueen graduated from Florida State University. He later earned his master's degree in communications from Florida Atlantic University.

He began his journalism career as a reporter for the Tallahassee Democrat in 1977. He was first hired by the Associated Press in 1980. McQueen worked as a reporter covering the Miami area for the AP, before becoming the press agency's correspondent in Florida's capital, Tallahassee.

McQueen was hired by the Miami Herald in 1984. He was promoted to editor at the Miami Herald and won a team Pulitzer Prize at the newspaper in 1993.

He later worked for both USA Today and the Gannett News Service. McQueen served as the director of the National Association of Black Journalists Southeast chapter for two years from 1986 until 1988. McQueen also worked as the managing editor of the Macon Telegraph.

McQueen also served as the chair of the journalism and broadcasting sequence department at the Florida International University School of Journalism and Mass Communication.

In 2005, McQueen was part of a group of Knight-Ridder editors who travelled to the United States Gulf Coast in the aftermath of Hurricane Katrina. McQueen joined The Sun Herald, which is headquartered in Biloxi, Mississippi, as a Knight-Ridder editor. The Sun Herald team, which included McQueen, won a Pulitzer Prize for Public Service in 2006 for their coverage of Hurricane Katrina.

In 2006, McQueen was hired for a second stint at the Associated Press, this time as the AP's assistant chief of bureau in New Orleans. He was promoted to the Associated Press bureau chief for Louisiana and Mississippi that same year,

Mike McQueen took a leave of absence in the spring of 2009 for the treatment of congestive heart failure and cancer. He died on October 25, 2009, at the age of 52. McQueen was survived by his wife, Glenda McQueen and son, Otto McQueen. McQueen's other son, Michael McQueen II, a U.S. Army Ranger who served in Afghanistan, had been murdered in 2006. McQueen's funeral was held at St. Anna's Episcopal Church in New Orleans.
