= Paul Bloom (lawyer) =

American lawyer (1939–2009)

Paul Laurence Bloom (May 14, 1939 – October 10, 2009) was an American lawyer working as a special counsel for the United States Department of Energy during the Carter Administration, who recovered $6 billion in refunds from dozens of oil producers in the United States who had overcharged as much as $11 billion for their products under price controls placed on "old oil" (oil obtained from wells that were drilled before a cutoff date), that had been imposed by Richard Nixon in the wake of the 1973 oil crisis, as a means to control prices and to encourage oil companies to search for new sources of petroleum that would not fall under the regulations.

== Early life and career ==
Bloom was born on May 14, 1939, in Norfolk, Virginia, and grew up in Chicago. He attended the University of Chicago where he received an undergraduate degree and received his legal training at the University of New Mexico School of Law. Following his graduation, he worked for the state of New Mexico as a natural resources lawyer.

== Energy Department ==
Bloom was appointed in 1977 as special counsel for compliance by Secretary of Energy James Schlesinger, and was responsible for investigating violations of oil price controls imposed following the 1973 oil crisis. Under regulations established during the Nixon administration, oil producers were given limits on prices for "old oil". At the same time, new discoveries were fostered by being excluded from these rules. With 600 attorneys and accountants performing investigations together with hundreds more from auditing firms, the task force was able to use subpoenas and to place auditors on-site at producing companies to analyze transactions. With this information, Bloom was able to identify excess charges amounting to $11 billion from all but two of the nation's 35 largest oil producers. Despite arguments from the oil companies that they were being charged with violations of arcane interpretations of the rules imposed, Bloom was able to recover $6 billion in refunds.

After receiving a settlement payment of $4 million from Standard Oil of Indiana, Bloom disbursed the funds to four charities, each receiving $1 million to assist poor people with their heating bills. The Reagan administration attempted to reclaim these funds, but by that time the charities had already distributed almost all of the money.

Bloom died at age 70 of pancreatic cancer on October 10, 2009, in Chevy Chase, Maryland. He was survived by his wife, Marjorie, as well as by two sons and a daughter.
