= Tube-and-fabric construction =

Method of building airframes

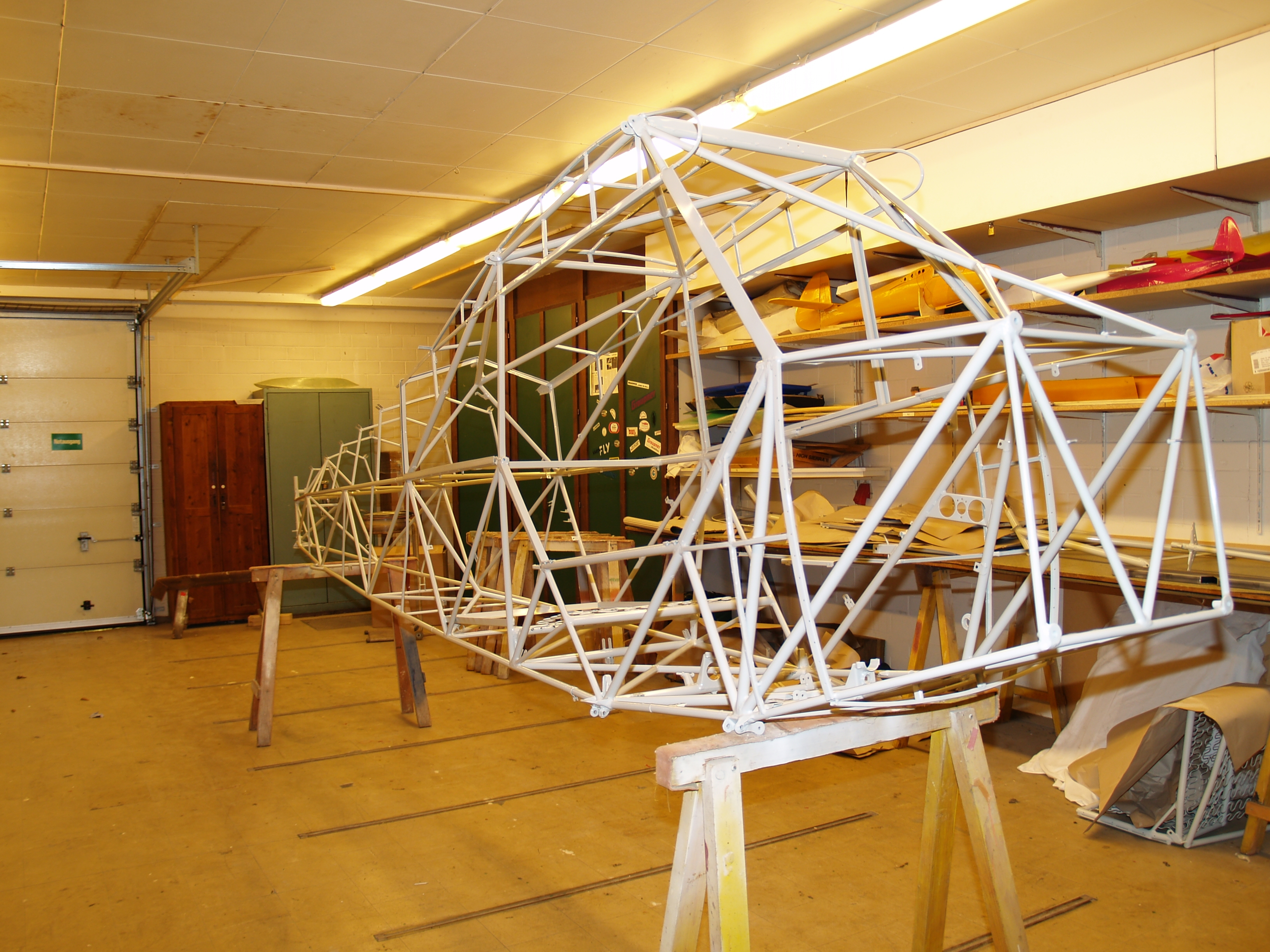
A stripped down tube and fabric constructed fuselage from a Piper PA-18 Super Cub

Tube-and-fabric construction is a method of building airframes, which include the fuselages and wings of airplanes. It consists of making a framework of metal tubes (generally welded together) and then covering the framework with an aircraft fabric covering.

The tubes are usually of steel or aluminum.

The advantages of tube-and-fabric construction over other methods of airframe construction (such as wood and sheet metal) are lower cost and faster speed of construction.

== See also ==
- Space frame
