= Tudor Chirilă =

Romanian actor, musician, composer and producer

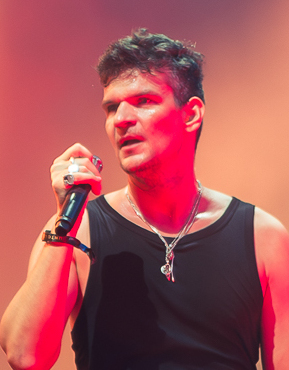
- Chirilă in 2024
- Born: 28 May 1974 (age 51); Bucharest, Romania
- Occupations: Actor, singer, and writer
- Notable work: Sandu ≈ Alexandru Pârvulescu, in the movie Legături bolnăvicioase

Tudor Chirilă (born 28 May 1974 in Bucharest, Romania) is a Romanian actor, musician, and writer. He was the lead singer of the bands Vama Veche and Vama. As an actor, he has featured in both short and feature-length films and has appeared in plays under the direction of Alexandru Darie, Alexandru Dabija, and Horațiu Mălăele, among others. Since 2014, he has been featured as a coach on The Voice of Romania. Chirilă's team has been victorious eight out of the ten seasons he has been a coach.

In 2012, he published his first book, Exerciții de Echilibru, a collection of writings from his personal blog.

== Early life ==
Tudor Chirilă was born in Bucharest on 28 May 1974. He is the son of sports reporter Ioan Chirilă and actress/director Iarina Demian. His brother is football coach Ionuț Chirilă. He graduated from the acting department of the Academy of Theater and Film (UNATC) in Bucharest in 1996, in the class of Florin Zamfirescu.

== Acting career ==
Chirilă's debut film appearance was in 1994 as an extra in the movie Nobody's Children. In 1999, he appeared in the Austrian movie Nordrand, directed by Barbara Albert. In 2001, Chirilă was a guest star in an episode of the Austrian series Kommisar Rex, playing the role of Dimitrij. In 2004, he starred in the Romanian movie Milionari de weekend, directed by Cătălin Saizescu, as Godzi, a youngster forced by circumstances to be an accomplice to a burglary. Two years later, he featured in the movie Legături bolnăvicioase, directed by Tudor Giurgiu. Between 2006 and 2012 he featured in a number of short films, including: Eu sunt eu, directed by Monica Istrate, and Love Marketing, written and directed by Andrei Sota. In 2013, Chirilă appeared as a gang leader in the movie The Enemy Within, produced by the Greek director Yorgos Tsemberopoulos. In the same year the short movie The Couch, produced by Emre Kayiș a year earlier, premiered in the United Kingdom.

In 2017, Warner Bros. Pictures chose Chirilă to provide the voice of the Joker in the Romanian version of Lego Batman: The Movie, and he also dubbed Roger Klotz in the animated movie First movie with Doug in 2000.

Chirilă has also worked in theatre, with directors including Alexandru Tocilescu, Alexandru Darie, Alexandru Dabija, Iarina Demian, Gelu Colceag, and Horațiu Mălăele. He made his debut in 1995 with "Trupa pe butoaie", a Romanian Theatre Union (Uniunea Teatrală din România; UNITER) project, coordinated by director Victor Ioan Frunză. From 1996 he was part of the Comedy Theater in Bucharest. In 2004, he was awarded the UNITER Award for the role of Malvolio in "Twelfth Night" by William Shakespeare, directed by Gelu Colceag.

== Music ==
=== Vama Veche ===
In 1996, Chirilă established the band Vama Veche with Traian Bălănescu and Liviu Mănescu. The band's debut album Nu am chef azi was released in 1998, followed by Vama Veche in 1999, a maxi single "Nu ne mai trageți pe dreapta" in 2000, Am să mă întorc bărbat in 2002, Best of Vama Veche in 2006 and Fericire în rate in 2006.

In 2003, the album Am să mă întorc bărbat was turned into a rock opera, and performed at the National Theatre Bucharest.

The band broke up in 2006.

=== Vama ===
After the break-up of Vama Veche, Chirilă and lead guitar player Eugen Caminschi established a new band, Vama, with the addition of drummer Lucian Cioargă, bass player Dan Opriș and keyboard player Raul Kusak, who was replaced by Gelu Ionescu in 2009.

In 2007 Vama's first single "Bed for love" was released, and a year later they released their first album Vama via SMS during a show at Bucharest's Arenele Romane. Singles from the album included "Pe sârmă", "Suflet normal", "Dumnezeu nu apare la știri" and "E plin de fete/Sâmbătă seara".

Their next album 2012 was released on 28 May 2012 at Sala Palatului. Singles from the album included: "Copilul care aleargă către mare", "Fata în boxeri și în tricoul alb", "Post iubire", and "Cântec de găsit". Chirilă wrote and directed the music-video for "Copilul care aleargă către mare".

=== Theatre scores ===
Tudor Chirilă has composed the soundtracks for multiple plays, including: Trei femei înalte by Eduard Ablee, directed by Vlad Massaci in 1997; O, tată, sărmane tată, mama te-a spânzurat în dulap iar eu sunt foarte trist by Arthur Kopit, directed by Iarina Demian in 2000; and A fost odată in Brooklyn by Neil Simon, directed by Iarina Demian in 2002.

=== The Voice Romania ===
In 2014, Tudor Chirilă became a judge-coach on the fourth season of Pro TV's The Voice Romania, alongside Loredana Groza, Smiley, and Marius Moga. Chirilă won in his first three seasons as a judge, with Tiberiu Albu, Cristina Bălan, and Teodora Buciu, successively, and then for three further consecutive seasons 9 to 11, with Dragoș Moldovan, Iulian Nunucă and Alexandra Căpitănescu, which made him the first and only (so far) The Voice coach to ever to win 3 consecutive times twice. In 2024 and 2025, Aura Șova and Alessia Pop won the show, extending Chirilă's winning streak to five in a row, making him the second only coach in the whole The Voice franchise ever to win 5 seasons in a row, after Michel Teló in The Voice Brasil, winning from 2015 to 2019.

== Writing ==
Initially focused on Chirilă's photography, his personal blog became widely read after his 2007 post: "Rolling stones, Smaranda, Luca. Muzica capitalistă", which was also published in the Jurnalul Național, and he subsequently became one of the most read Romanian bloggers. His blogpost "Scrisoare către liceeni" received thousands of online views and had a large impact over youngsters.

In November 2012, Tudor Chirilă released a collection of his writings, Exerciții de echilibru, including fragments of compositions, poems, essays, pamphlets, and opinion commentary, with a preface from Cătălin Tolontan. The release took place at the International Book Fair Gaudeamus in Bucharest, with guests Cristian Tudor Popescu and Florin Iaru. Exerciții de echilibru became a best-seller.

== Other projects ==
Chirilă has also initiated and supported numerous social and cultural projects:

- In 2005, he initiated the humanitarian campaign "Live pentru viață", to gather donations for flood victims, during which he held an eight-hour fundraising concert.
- Starting 2005, the Ioan Chirilă Awards were given to the best sport journalists in Romania, at the initiative of Chirilă and his mother, to honour the memory of his father, Ioan Chirilă. The project also featured an annual competition, "Talentul Anului", for amateurs who wanted to become sports journalists. The awards were held six times until 2010, when the project was put on hold.
- In 2009, he initiated a mentorship project, "Chirilă în licee", as part of which he toured 20 high schools in Bucharest and spoke to thousands of high school students about the importance of discovering their own value and talents. A follow-up study to the project was conducted by psychologists and sociologists to investigate who are viewed as role models by high school students in Bucharest.
- In 2010, Chirilă and his management company organised "Cruciada Culturii", a campaign to promote public artistic performance, which brought international classical music artists including Sarah Chang, Joshua Bell, Sam Haywood, Lily Maisky, Mischa Maisky and AdLibitum Quartet to play concerts in Bucharest.
- In 2011, Chirilă supported the "Nu ma ignora" campaign, initiated by the Salvează Vieți Association, writing and producing a series of online adverts featuring Romanian celebrities such as Andreea Raicu and Cabral to raise funds for the establishment of a Romanian center for diagnosis and treatment of cancer in children.

== Acting roles ==
=== Films ===
Film	Director	Country	Year
Live	Vlad Păunescu	Romania	2015
The Couch (short)	Emre Kayiș	United Kingdom	2014
The Enemy Within	Yorgos Tsemberopoulos	Greece	2014
Eu sunt eu (short)	Monica Istrate	Romania	2009
The Love Marketing (short)	Andrei Sota	Romania	2008
Legături bolnăvicioase	Tudor Giurgiu	Romania	2006
Milionari de weekend	Cătălin Saizescu	Romania	2003
Komissar Rex	Michael Siebler	Austria	2001
Northern Skirts	Barbara Albert	Austria- (Germany)-Switzerland	1999
Shapeshifter	Cristian Andrei	Romania	1999

=== Theatre ===
Theatre roles
Role	Play	Director	Theater	Year
Tartuffe	"Tartuffe"	László Bocsárdi	Comedy Theater	2014
Stephen	"Coada"	Iarina Demian	Bulandra Theater	2014
Dirijorul, Soțul, John	"O lume pe dos"	Iarina Demian	Comedy Theater	2010
Sergent Toomey	"Biloxi Blues"	Iarina Demian	Comedy Theater	2007
Axenti Ivanovici Popriscin	"Ferdinand al VIII-lea, Regele Spaniei"	Iarina Demian	Comedy Theater	2006
Charles	"Chirița of Bârzoieni"	Iarina Demian	Comedy Theater	2004
Malvolio	"Twelfth Night"	Gelu Colceag	Comedy Theater	2003
Stanley	A fost odată în Brooklyn	Iarina Demian	Comedy Theater	2002
Jonathan	"O, tată, sărmane tată, mama te-a spânzurat în dulap, iar eu sunt foarte trist"	Iarina Demian	Comedy Theater	2000
Adraste	"Iluzia comică"	Alexandru Darie	Comedy Theater	1999
Baltasar	"Comedia erorilor"	Alexandru Dabija	Comedy Theater	1999
Vicontele Achille	"Pălăria"	Horațiu Mălăele	Comedy Theater	1997
Fiul	"Trei femei înalte"	Vlad Massaci	Comedy Theater	1996
Spirt	"Mireasa mută"	Alexandru Tocilescu	Comedy Theater	1995
