= Andrei Boncea =

Romanian film and television producer

- Born: 6 February 1972 (age 54); Șuici, Argeș County, Romania
- Occupations: Film and television producer
- Years active: 1992–present

Andrei Boncea (born 6 February 1972) is a Romanian film and television producer. He joined the Media Pro group as a reporter in 1993 and ran its production company, MediaPro Pictures, from 1999 to 2011. At MediaPro Pictures he worked on foreign films shot in Romania, among them Costa-Gavras's Amen. and Franco Zeffirelli's Callas Forever. He also produced Romanian films, from Furia (2002) to I'm an Old Communist Hag (2013). One of them was California Dreamin' (endless), the first feature of Cristian Nemescu. The film won the Un Certain Regard prize at the 2007 Cannes Film Festival.

After Central European Media Enterprises (CME) bought the group's production division at the end of 2009, Boncea ran the division until 2012 and then became CME's head of content. He later went into business with the director Dragoș Buliga at Frame Film, the company behind the television series Las Fierbinți. Frame Film handled the Romanian shoots of The Protégé (2021), with Michael Keaton and Samuel L. Jackson, and of the series Django. When Romania's state aid scheme for film production stalled, he moved part of his work to Slovakia. There he was an executive producer of Renny Harlin's The Strangers trilogy. He was also one of the producers of The Yellow Tie (2025), a film about the conductor Sergiu Celibidache. It was the most watched Romanian film of 2025 and won eight Gopo Awards. In 2026 he was president of the Alliance of Film Producers, a Romanian industry body.

== Early life and career ==
Boncea started out in 1992 as a reporter for the newspaper Realitatea Românească. A year later he joined the Media Pro group, first as a reporter for the Mediafax news agency and then as news director of Canal 31, the station that later became Pro TV. He ran production at Pro TV from 1995 to 1997 and was in charge of programming and production until 1999. This account comes from a biography that CME published in 2012 in a filing with the U.S. Securities and Exchange Commission.

He spent more than 20 years at Pro TV, where he held several senior production posts. In a 2018 interview he said that Adrian Sârbu had backed him throughout his career and had believed in television fiction and comedy. He named Paul Klein, an American consultant brought in by CME when Pro TV started, as one of his mentors. Klein, he said, taught him that a programme has only three minutes to win its audience.

== MediaPro Pictures ==
From 1999 until October 2011 Boncea was general manager of MediaPro Pictures, the group's film and television company, based at the studios in Buftea. On 1 October 2011 Andrei-Cosmin Ion took over the management of the company. The board's decision was published in the Monitorul Oficial, and Boncea remained chairman of the board.

=== Foreign productions ===
Boncea dates the start of his career as a producer to Costa-Gavras's Amen. In 2013 he said it had been, at the time, the most important production made in Romania since the fall of communism. He was part of the crew and, over a few months, learned "everything that matters" on a large film from the production manager Irina Chiriță and the producer Michèle Ray-Gavras. Variety listed him as the film's line producer for the Romanian shoot.

In the same years he worked on Zeffirelli's Callas Forever and on Alexandre Arcady's Entre chiens et loups. These were followed by Modigliani (2004) and Christian Carion's Joyeux Noël (2005), which was nominated for the Academy Award for Best Foreign Language Film.

He was a co-producer of An American Haunting, starring Donald Sutherland and Sissy Spacek. He had the same credit on Out of Season (2004), a British, German and Romanian co-production, and on Blood and Chocolate (2007), directed by Katja von Garnier for MGM. With the producers Rudolf Biermann and Tomáš Hoffman he worked on Roming (2007), by the Czech director Jiří Vejdělek, and on the Polish comedy Zamiana (2009). He was also a co-producer of Dolina (2007), a film by the Hungarian director Zoltán Kamondi made with MediaPro Pictures.

According to the Romanian Screenwriters' Association, he produced more than 70 Romanian and foreign films for cinema and television between 2000 and 2013. The association also listed him as director de film, the Romanian credit for a production manager, on seven foreign productions. Among them were Elvira's Haunted Hills and Alexandre Aja's High Tension. In 2018 Boncea said he had co-produced the latter. By then the French film, released at home as Haute Tension, had become a cult title and had taken Aja to Hollywood.

=== Romanian films ===
MediaPro Pictures also made Romanian films in this period. Boncea was a producer of Radu Muntean's Furia (2002), made with Imaginator Film. He produced Garcea și oltenii (2002) and two 2005 films by Dan Pița, Second Hand and Femeia visurilor (The Woman of Dreams). He was an associate producer of Nae Caranfil's Filantropica (2002).

In 2005 he produced Lacrimi de iubire (Tears of Love), which Cineuropa described as the first Romanian spin-off. The film picked up the story of the telenovela of the same name where the series had ended. Next came the comedy Trei frați de belea (Three Loony Brothers, 2006) and two films by Stere Gulea, Weekend cu mama (Weekend with My Mother, 2009) and I'm an Old Communist Hag (2013). The first received a Gopo nomination for make-up and hair in 2010. I'm an Old Communist Hag, with Luminița Gheorghiu in the lead, opened in cinemas on 23 August 2013. At the 2014 Gopo Awards it had three nominations, for cinematography, original music and make-up.

Boncea made four films with Sergiu Nicolaescu. The first was Supraviețuitorul (The Survivor, 2008). It was followed by Carol I – Un destin pentru România (2009), Poker (2010) and Ultimul corupt din România (The Last Corrupt Man in Romania, 2012). Poker was based on a play by Adrian Lustig that had run at the Comedy Theatre in Bucharest. It was shot in the autumn of 2009, mostly at Snagov Palace. In 2007 the project had received €340,000 from the Romanian Film Centre (CNC).

Supraviețuitorul won the Audience Award at the 2009 Gopo Awards, which goes to the most successful Romanian film of the previous year at the box office. Produced by Boncea, it had sold 25,706 tickets. The same year it was nominated for best editing.

Ceva bun de la viață (Something Good from Life) was the third film by Dan Pița that Boncea produced, after Second Hand and Femeia visurilor. It was shot over seven weeks between April and June 2010 in a mining area of Romania. The Screenwriters' Association also credited Boncea with the Christmas comedy Ho Ho Ho (2009).

The short film Tatăl meu e cel mai tare (My Dad Is the Best, 2012), directed by Radu Potcoavă and produced by Boncea, was nominated for best short film at the 2013 Gopo Awards. Cineuropa also lists him as the producer of Cuscrii (The In-Laws, 2014), Potcoavă's comedy starring Mircea Diaconu and Luminița Gheorghiu, made by MediaPro Entertainment.

=== California Dreamin' (endless) ===
Boncea produced Cristian Nemescu's first feature film, California Dreamin' (endless). Iuliana Tarnovețchi was the executive producer. Armand Assante, who plays one of the leads, said Boncea had contacted him and sent him the script. The film was shot between 29 May and 21 July 2006 in Fundeni-Frunzănești (Călărași County), Comana (Giurgiu County) and Constanța. Production costs came to $1.6 million.

Nemescu died in a car crash on 24 August 2006, together with the sound engineer Andrei Toncu, after a day in the editing room. In May 2007 Boncea said that the first cut was 95 per cent complete. A few minor linking shots had never been filmed. Boncea decided they should not be shot, because the director's vision could not be recreated. The working cut ran to more than three hours. MediaPro Pictures took out only a few passages and released the film on 1 June 2007, with "endless" added to the title. According to Cineuropa, Boncea wanted to keep the director's unfinished version and added the word because nobody could know what the final cut would have looked like. The Variety reviewer noted that the producers had added the words in brackets after the director's death and that "unfinished" would have been a better choice.

The film was selected for the Un Certain Regard section at Cannes. The jury, chaired by Pascale Ferran, had at first decided not to judge an unfinished film. It changed its mind after the screening and gave the film the section's prize. At the 2008 Gopo Awards the film was nominated for best feature film, with Boncea as producer. It was also released in France, by Bodega Films, and in the Netherlands.

=== Television production ===
At MediaPro Pictures Boncea also worked in television, on series such as Băieți buni (2005) and Mondenii (2006) and on the television film Contra timp (2008). In 2018 he described Băieți buni as the first attempt at a police series. For Prima TV he produced the live editions of Mondenii. The Screenwriters' Association also credited him with the sitcom La bloc, the telenovela Numai iubirea and the series Lacrimi de iubire. The same list included the series Cu un pas înainte and the fantasy film Fire and Ice: The Dragon Chronicles.

Boncea said that before Las Fierbinți he had made countless comedy pilots that nobody ever saw. At the time, he said, Pro TV and CME gave strong backing to the development of fiction. In July 2010 MediaPro Pictures was shooting a rural comedy for television, Las Fierbinți, at Fierbinții de Jos. It was directed by Dragoș Buliga from a script by Bogdan Mirică, and Pro TV planned to air it the following year. The series of the same name, on which Boncea was a producer, began in 2012. In his view, Las Fierbinți would hardly have existed without Vine poliția!, an earlier series that Buliga adapted from the Spanish Los hombres de Paco.

== Central European Media Enterprises ==
CME bought Media Pro Entertainment, the production division that included MediaPro Pictures, in December 2009. Boncea became senior vice president of the division and ran it until 20 January 2012. From that date he was CME's head of content. In March 2011 FilmNewEurope described him as chief executive of Media Pro Entertainment. Chris Bosco had just become the division's chief financial officer, and Boncea said he would help the company become a major international studio.

In December 2013 Boncea was the guest of a public session of the Bucharest Script Lab, the screenwriting workshop of the Romanian Screenwriters' Association, where he was a producer and consultant. He said there that a good script shows itself "in the first three pages".

== Frame Film ==
Since the mid-2010s Boncea has worked with Dragoș Buliga at Frame Film. Several publications describe the two men as the company's founders. His biography at the Aspen Institute Romania gives him as a partner in Frame Film since 2013. Fanatik, however, reported that the company was set up in 2008 by Dragoș and Eugenia Buliga and that Boncea became a shareholder in 2014. In 2022 Boncea and Buliga held equal stakes and were the company's directors. The same year Boncea was expanding the studio complex in Bucharest. In 2026 FilmNewEurope referred to Frame Film's studios in Popești-Leordeni, near Bucharest.

=== Series and Romanian films ===
Frame Film produces Las Fierbinți. When Romania launched its state aid scheme for film in 2018, Boncea had been working on the series for five years. That year he described himself as an executive producer in the Frame Film team.

In February 2015 Boncea was working on Atletico Textila, a comedy series whose cast included members of the Mondenii team. He had also applied to Romania's National Audiovisual Council for licences for two satellite channels, GustArte and Comedia. Atletico Textila, a comedy about a fourth-division football club, was his first independent production after 20 years at Pro TV. Its creative team was the one that had made Mondenii. In 2018 Boncea said the channel had decided not to continue the series, although the ratings had been good and the third season had come out much better.

For Pro TV, Frame Film Studios also produced the comedy Ai noștri, directed by Buliga, which started on 2 March 2017. Pro TV scheduled the premiere of Triplusec, another series from the same company, for 13 September 2018. Boncea was a producer of Triplusec and of the series Anii de sâmbătă seara (2017). With Buliga he also produced two comedy pilots. One was based on a script by Nae Caranfil about students under communism. The other was a project by Letiția Roșculeț and Cristina Badea.

Boncea also produced Buliga's first feature film, The Wanderers (Vânătorul de spirite). The film, an independent project by Wanderers Inc., Frame Film and That's the Film, was shot in Sighișoara, Dofteana and Bucharest. Its dialogue is in English, Romanian, German and Korean. Armand Assante plays a vampire hunter looking into strange events at a castle in Transylvania. The film won best feature at the Dracula Film Festival in Brașov and at the Unreal Film Festival in Memphis. In 2018 it won best dramatic feature at the Philip K. Dick Science Fiction Film Festival in New York. It opened in Romanian cinemas on 19 April 2018. In the week of the release Assante also appeared in an episode of Las Fierbinți.

In the summer of 2026 Frame Film, represented by Boncea, was a co-producer of The Forest of Lost Whispers, a fantasy film for children directed by Igor Cobileanski. The lead producer is Colorbitor Production, and the other co-producer is Symbol Media of Moldova. The story comes from a novel inspired by The Story of Harap Alb. Filming began in late June in dozens of locations, among them Bucharest, Chișinău and Orhei. The film was due for release in Romania on 23 April 2027.

=== International productions in Romania ===
Frame Film's first international production was Dampyr, shot in Transylvania until December 2019. The second was a thriller directed by Martin Campbell and starring Michael Keaton and Maggie Q, filmed under the working title The Asset. Frame Film, represented by Boncea and Buliga, was the local company that provided production services. The production was due to receive about €6.25 million under the state aid scheme, which refunded 35 per cent of eligible spending. The film came out in 2021 as The Protégé and in Romania as Codul asasinului. The Romanian shoot lasted ten weeks, from early January 2020 until the lockdown in March, in Bucharest and Snagov. More than 200 Romanian crew members and a hundred extras worked on the film. Boncea was one of its Romanian producers, with Buliga and Gabriel Popescu.

In a January 2020 interview, Boncea said the locations had been scouted for more than a month, with the director and the producers, largely on foot around Bucharest. Several scenes set in Saigon and Da Nang were recreated in old Bucharest. Boncea compared it with the Vietnamese cities because of the French influence on their architecture of the late 19th and early 20th centuries. One of the main Vietnam scenes was filmed in the English Passage on Calea Victoriei. In the same interview he called The Asset the biggest film to come to Romania since the state aid scheme began.

In 2021 Frame Film provided production services in Romania for Django, a series made for Sky and Canal+ and directed by Francesca Comencini, with Matthias Schoenaerts in the title role. Filming began on 10 May 2021. The series was produced by Cattleya and Atlantique Productions, and part of it was filmed in the crater of the extinct volcano at Racoș. The Romanian production team was led by Boncea, Claudia Stavrositu and Adrian Codoi. Boncea is credited as a producer of the series.

=== Slovakia ===
In 2021 Frame Film expanded into Slovakia. The first production of its subsidiary, Frame Film SK, was The Performance, based on a novella by Arthur Miller, starring Jeremy Piven and Robert Carlyle and directed by Shira Piven. Filming began in November 2021 in Bratislava and was planned to last 30 days, with Boncea and Gabriel Popescu as executive producers. The film had first been prepared for Romania. The stalled state aid scheme led the producers to move it to Slovakia, where state support for international productions was 33 per cent. It was shown at the Rome Film Festival in October 2023.

In the summer of 2022 Boncea was preparing, also in Slovakia, the Strangers trilogy directed by Renny Harlin for Lionsgate. The three films were shot in Bratislava. Boncea was one of the executive producers, and Frame Film SK was a co-producer. By November 2022 filming had ended on all three. The producers of the trilogy included Courtney Solomon and Christopher Milburn, who had also produced An American Haunting. The first part, The Strangers: Chapter 1, was released in cinemas on 17 May 2024.

In 2024 Radio Free Europe reported that Boncea had moved production to Slovakia three years earlier, with a team of a hundred specialists. He said at the time that the company was producing more projects there than in Romania.

=== The Yellow Tie ===
The Yellow Tie (Cravata galbenă), a film about the life of Sergiu Celibidache directed by the conductor's son, Serge Ioan Celebidachi, lists Boncea among its producers. In 2022 FilmNewEurope named Boncea and Christopher Milburn of Frame Film among the producers. The film is an Oblique Media production, with Frame Film and Frame Film Illustrious Studio among its co-producers.

Filming began in Bucharest on 14 June 2023 and was scheduled to run until 17 August. According to the producer Cristina Dobrițoiu, the Romanian and British co-production had a budget of €15 million. Ben Schnetzer plays the conductor as a young man and John Malkovich plays him in old age. The part of the young Celibidache had first gone to Rupert Friend. The cast also includes Miranda Richardson and Sean Bean. In June 2023 thousands of people watched the filming of a concert conducted by Malkovich at Sala Palatului. In the spring of 2024 the film was offered to buyers at the Cannes film market through VMI Worldwide.

The gala premiere took place at Sala Palatului on 1 November 2025, attended by Malkovich and Bean. The director Tim Burton was also among the guests. The film opened in cinemas on 14 November 2025, released by Vertical Entertainment. By the end of the year it had 491,770 admissions and had grossed 14,916,296 lei. It ranked second at the Romanian box office for 2025, behind Avatar: Fire and Ash, and was the most watched Romanian film of the year. By June 2026 admissions had passed 500,000. From 10 June 2026 the film was available on Netflix in Romania and Moldova. That month it was selected for the Shanghai International Film Festival. In July it was shown at TIFF Chișinău, and in November it opened the Romanian Film Festival in Munich.

At the 2026 Gopo Awards The Yellow Tie had eight nominations and won six of them. Ben Schnetzer won best actor in a leading role, and the other five awards were in technical categories. Sebastian Cosor and Ștefan Popescu, the founders of the Safe Frame studio, received a special award for the film's visual effects. The film also won the Audience Award, which goes to the production with the biggest box-office success. With eight trophies, it was the most awarded film of the ceremony.

== Film production incentives ==
As early as 2009, as general manager of MediaPro Pictures, Boncea was calling for tax incentives for foreign productions. He estimated then that production services brought Romania between €30 million and €40 million a year. With incentives like those in other European countries, he said, the figure could reach €200 million or even €300 million. He pointed to the Czech Republic, where production volume had fallen by about 85 per cent since 2003 because the state had stayed out.

Romania introduced a state aid scheme in 2018, under which the state refunded part of what film productions spent in the country. Payments stalled in the following years, and several production companies went to court.

In a 2021 interview with b365.ro, quoted by Fanatik, Boncea said there would be lawsuits, that producers would win them and that the state would end up having to "pay for the most expensive ticket". On 9 February 2022 Frame Film sued the Ministry of Entrepreneurship and Tourism at the Bucharest Court of Appeal. The company claimed 29.8 million lei, the sum promised for The Protégé. The court rejected the claim at first instance as time-barred, a ruling reported in early July 2022.

In June 2022 Variety reported that Boncea was involved in litigation to recover about $7 million owed for The Protégé. He called the scheme badly conceived from the outset and asked for a new system that would be fair and transparent. In Slovakia, he said, he had obtained in two days what would have taken a year in Romania.

In May 2023 the culture minister told Variety that the government wanted to launch a new programme with an annual budget of €50 million. Boncea, whose company had serviced Django, said he was very confident that this time the scheme would work. A year later Radio Free Europe quoted him as saying that nothing had been paid back to him. By his estimate, about 79 million lei was owed for three projects, money that belonged to the foreign producers.

== Alliance of Film Producers ==
The Alliance of Film Producers (Alianța Producătorilor de Film, APF) was founded in May 2020 and had 37 member companies by that summer. Boncea sat on its steering committee, along with producers such as Ada Solomon and Tudor Giurgiu.

In May 2026 Boncea spoke as president of the alliance at a debate on Romanian film production held at the Marché du Film, the market of the Cannes festival. He described the period as one of maturity and cooperation and said the alliance had changed the producers' relationship with the authorities. Working together, he said, had allowed producers to revise the law and update the CNC's system.

In October 2026 the alliance worked with Romanian Creative Week for the first time, through Boncea. A showcase of Romanian films about migration, with directors such as Radu Jude, was held in the auditorium of the National Museum of Art of Romania. At a round table during the same event, Boncea spoke about how artificial intelligence could change the creative professions. He described the rise of the "artist-company", a creator able to do alone part of the work that once needed whole teams. At the end of the month he was announced as a guest of the Romanian International Acting Masterclass, as a producer, co-founder of Frame Film and president of the APF.

== Theatre ==
His biography at the Aspen Institute Romania describes him as the founder, in 2015, of the WonderTheatre company. In 2017, however, Business Review named Alexandru Tomulescu as the founder of the project. The company was then described as the first in Romania devoted to family theatre, with plays staged mostly in cinema halls in shopping malls, among them Cina de adio and Prenumele. In 2019 WonderTheatre staged the musical We Will Rock You at Sala Palatului, directed by Răzvan Mazilu.

== Personal life ==
In 1998 Boncea married the singer Loredana Groza. They have a daughter. In the spring of 2023 Groza's father confirmed to the press that the couple had separated. Boncea's brother, Sorin Boncea, is the production designer of Las Fierbinți.

== Filmography ==
Credits follow Cinemagia unless another source is given.

=== Film ===
Film credits
Year	Title	Director	Credited as
2001	Elvira's Haunted Hills	Sam Irvin	Executive producer
2002	Amen.	Costa-Gavras	Line producer (Romania)
2002	Callas Forever	Franco Zeffirelli	Co-producer
2002	Entre chiens et loups	Alexandre Arcady	Producer
2002	Filantropica	Nae Caranfil	Associate producer
2002	Furia	Radu Muntean	Producer
2002	Garcea și oltenii	Sam Irvin	Producer
2003	Boudica	Bill Anderson	Executive producer
2003	Dulcea saună a morții	Andrei Blaier	Executive producer
2003	High Tension	Alexandre Aja	Co-producer
2004	Modigliani	Mick Davis	Co-producer
2004	Nature Unleashed: Fire	Allan A. Goldstein	Producer
2004	Out of Season	Jevon O'Neill	Co-producer
2005	An American Haunting	Courtney Solomon	Co-producer
2005	Joyeux Noël	Christian Carion	Co-producer
2005	Femeia visurilor	Dan Pița	Producer
2005	House of 9	Steven R. Monroe	Co-producer
2005	Lacrimi de iubire	Iura Luncașu	Producer
2005	Second Hand	Dan Pița	Producer
2005	Tornado	Alain Jakubowicz	Producer
2006	Dragoste de mamă	Ioan Cărmăzan	Producer (television film)
2006	Margo	Ioan Cărmăzan	Producer
2006	O lume a durerii	Mihai Bauman	Executive producer
2006	Răzbunarea	Adrian Sitaru	Executive producer
2006	The Last Drop	Colin Teague	Co-producer
2006	Trei frați de belea	Theodor Halacu-Nicon	Producer
2007	Blood and Chocolate	Katja von Garnier	Co-producer
2007	California Dreamin' (endless)	Cristian Nemescu	Producer
2007	Dolina	Zoltán Kamondi	Co-producer
2007	Roming	Jiří Vejdělek	Producer
2008	Contra timp	Virgil Nicolaescu, Jesús del Cerro	Producer (television film)
2008	Fire and Ice: The Dragon Chronicles	Pitof	Producer (television film)
2008	Na vlastní nebezpečí	Filip Renc	Producer
2008	Supraviețuitorul	Sergiu Nicolaescu	Producer
2008	Taková normální rodinka	Patrik Hartl	Producer
2008	Un film simplu	Tommy Gatsoulis	Producer
2009	Carol I – Un destin pentru România	Sergiu Nicolaescu	Producer
2009	Ho Ho Ho	Jesús del Cerro	Producer
2009	Weekend cu mama	Stere Gulea	Producer
2009	Zamiana	Konrad Aksinowicz	Producer
2010	Poker	Sergiu Nicolaescu	Producer
2011	Ceva bun de la viață	Dan Pița	Producer
2012	Tatăl meu e cel mai tare	Radu Potcoavă	Producer (short film)
2012	Ultimul corupt din România	Sergiu Nicolaescu	Producer
2013	I'm an Old Communist Hag	Stere Gulea	Producer
2014	Cuscrii	Radu Potcoavă	Producer
2017	The Wanderers	Dragoș Buliga	Producer
2021	The Protégé	Martin Campbell	Romanian producer
2023	The Performance	Shira Piven	Executive producer
2024	The Strangers: Chapter 1	Renny Harlin	Executive producer
2025	The Strangers: Chapter 2	Renny Harlin	Executive producer
2025	The Yellow Tie	Serge Ioan Celebidachi	Producer
2026	The Strangers: Chapter 3	Renny Harlin	Executive producer

=== Television ===
Television credits
Year	Title	Director	Credited as	Notes
2002	Râdeți cu oameni ca noi	Melia Cerchez Anghel, Theodor Halacu-Nicon	Producer	Satire show
2002	La bloc		Producer	Sitcom, Pro TV
2004	Numai iubirea		Producer	Telenovela, Acasă TV
2005	Băieți buni	Bogdan Bărbulescu, Laurențiu Rusescu, Theodor Halacu-Nicon, Bogdan Dreyer	Producer	Series, Pro TV
2005	Fete cu lipici	Radu Dragomir	Producer	Series, Pro TV
2005	Lacrimi de iubire		Producer	Telenovela, Acasă TV
2006	Învăț să fiu mama ta		Producer	Series
2006	Mondenii	George Dogaru, Titus Scurt, Alina Filiche	Producer	Parody series, including the live editions on Prima TV
2007	Cu un pas înainte		Producer	Series, Pro TV
2008	Vine poliția!	Phil Ramuno, Anca Colțeanu, Dragoș Buliga	Producer	Series
2012	Las Fierbinți	Dragoș Buliga and others	Producer	Series, Pro TV
2016	Atletico Textila	George Dogaru	Producer	Series, Pro TV
2017	Anii de sâmbătă seara	Dragoș Buliga	Producer	Series
2018	Triplusec	Letiția Roșculeț	Producer	Series, Pro TV
2023	Django	Francesca Comencini, Enrico Maria Artale, David Evans	Producer	Sky and Canal+ series, filmed in Romania with Frame Film

== Awards and nominations ==
The table lists the awards and nominations of the Romanian films produced by Boncea, at the Gopo Awards and at festivals.

Year	Award	Category	Nominated work	Result	Ref.
2007	Cannes Film Festival	Un Certain Regard Award	California Dreamin' (endless)	Won	
2008	Gopo Awards	Best Feature Film	California Dreamin' (endless)	Nominated	
2009	Gopo Awards	Audience Award	Supraviețuitorul	Won	
2009	Gopo Awards	Best Editing	Supraviețuitorul	Nominated	
2010	Gopo Awards	Best Make-up and Hair	Weekend cu mama	Nominated	
2013	Gopo Awards	Best Short Film	Tatăl meu e cel mai tare	Nominated	
2014	Gopo Awards	Best Cinematography	I'm an Old Communist Hag	Nominated	
2014	Gopo Awards	Best Original Music	I'm an Old Communist Hag	Nominated	
2014	Gopo Awards	Best Make-up and Hair	I'm an Old Communist Hag	Nominated	
2018	Philip K. Dick Science Fiction Film Festival	Best Dramatic Feature	The Wanderers	Won	
2026	Gopo Awards	Best Actor in a Leading Role (Ben Schnetzer)	The Yellow Tie	Won	
2026	Gopo Awards	Best Editing	The Yellow Tie	Won	
2026	Gopo Awards	Best Sound	The Yellow Tie	Won	
2026	Gopo Awards	Best Production Design	The Yellow Tie	Won	
2026	Gopo Awards	Best Costume Design	The Yellow Tie	Won	
2026	Gopo Awards	Best Make-up and Hair	The Yellow Tie	Won	
2026	Gopo Awards	Best Cinematography	The Yellow Tie	Nominated	
2026	Gopo Awards	Best Original Music	The Yellow Tie	Nominated	
2026	Gopo Awards	Special Award (visual effects)	The Yellow Tie	Won	
2026	Gopo Awards	Audience Award	The Yellow Tie	Won	
