= Profu' =

Romanian dramedy TV show

- Genre: Dramedy
- Created by: Yannick Posse; Berthold Probst; Thomas Koch; Peter Freiberg
- Based on: Der Lehrer by Peter Freiberg & Thomas Koch
- Country of origin: Romania
- No. of seasons: 2
- No. of episodes: 20

Production
- Production locations: Bucharest, Romania

Original release
- Network: Pro TV
- Release: September 10, 2019 – April 22, 2021

Profu' is a Romanian dramedy TV show that started airing September 10, 2019 on Pro TV. The show is loosely based on RTL's Der Lehrer and stars Andi Vasluianu as Mihai "Mișu" Iacob, the teacher of physics, physical education and chemistry at the Industrial High School "Emil Gârleanu" in Bucharest. The soundtrack of the series is provided by HaHaHa Production and the sponsors of the series are Coca-Cola and KFC.

In 2020, Pro TV renewed Profu' for a second season.

== Premise ==
Mihai Iacob, the favorite teacher of the students from the "Emil Gârleanu" Industrial High School in the capital, goes through a lot of funny and less funny experiences when Ms. Ana Casian comes to the high school to teach Romanian language and literature. A complicated relationship takes place between the two. It becomes even more complicated when their students come to play a very important role in their lives as well.

== Cast and characters ==
Actor	Character
Andi Vasluianu	Mihai "Mișu" Iacob (Profu')
Aida Economu	Ana Casian (Profa)
Gabriel Radu	Principal Tănase
Virgil Ianțu	Anton "Tony"
Doru Cătănescu	Petre
Cosmin Natanticu	Mugur
Alina Mîndru	Mr. Codoiu
Răzvan Călin	Emil
Robert Dobre	Tudor
Juno	Nuni
Feihong Pascu	Pei Pei
Iacob Paștină	Renato
Adrian Gheorghe	Mirel
Luca Petreșteanu	Silviu
Sebastian Seredinschi	Sorin
Azaleea Necula	Tania
Daria Pintilie	Paula
Bianca Mihaela Lixandru AKA Bibi	Rita
Andra Meda Topârceanu	Lili
Rebecca Nicolescu	Livia
Sibylla Oancea	Secretary Doina

== Episodes ==
Season	Episodes	Originally released	
Season	Episodes	First released	Last released
1	10	September 10, 2019	November 19, 2019
2	10	February 11, 2021	April 22, 2021

=== Season 1 (2019) ===
# overall	# per season	Name	Original air date
1		Legea conservării	September 10, 2019
2		O lume minunată	September 17, 2019
3		Vanilla Ice și Julieta	September 24, 2019
4		Delegația	October 1, 2019
5		Sărăcia e o etapă	October 8, 2019
6		Cine sunt eu cu adevărat?	October 22, 2019
7		Viața în roz	October 29, 2019
8		Fugi, Mișule, fugi	November 5, 2019
9		O absență în plus, un patru în minus	November 12, 2019
10		Cine e eroul?	November 19, 2019

=== Season 2 (2021) ===
# overall	# per season	Name	Original air date
11	1	Pușcăriașul	February 11, 2021
12	2	Rebel fără clasă	February 18, 2021
13	3	Unde e extinctorul?	February 25, 2021
14	4	Toți suntem puțin stricați	March 4, 2021
15	5	Operațiunea dulapul	March 11, 2021
16	6	Alarma	March 18, 2021
17	7	Knock Out	April 1, 2021
18	8	Copilul problemă	April 8, 2021
19	9	ADN-ul tău, problema ta	April 15, 2021
20	10	Domnul și Doamna Iacob	April 22, 2021
