= Cristian Panait =

Romanian prosecutor

Cristian Panait (March 29, 1973 in Târgoviște – April 10, 2002 in Bucharest) was a Romanian prosecutor for criminal investigation at the Supreme Court of Justice who, on April 10, 2002, committed suicide after reportedly coming under pressure to prosecute another justice official, Alexandru Lele.

== Suicide ==
In the spring of 2002, Cristian Panait was pressured by his superiors to investigate a colleague who had prosecuted the son of a former prefect in Bihor County for petrol smuggling. He was sent to penalize the prosecutor Alexandru Lele over his courage to order the arrest of the son of Bihor County prefect, Adrian Tarau, one of ruling Romanian party Social Democratic Party's main sponsors.

Alexandru Lele affirmed the then-Prime Minister Adrian Năstase was "trampling criminal investigations under foot." Several Romanian newspapers claimed that political interference at a high level was influencing seniors in the prosecution office to force Panait to make the investigation. Panait refused to submit to such demands and his superiors took the case away from him. Despite this, Panait wrote a non-indictment decision on his colleague and turned it into the office. His superiors then took away all his cases. Arguably, a large conspiracy surrounded Panait to demonstrate to him that he had schizophrenia and on the verge of a nervous breakdown. Nevertheless, Alexandru Lele stated that the Supreme Court of Justice had the Prosecutor General's Office should take into account "the likelihood of prosecutor Cristian Panait's being killed". He said, "I am sure that political pressure was put on Panait regarding at least two of the cases he was in charge of - my case and that of deputy Gheorghiu, but I do not think investigators took into account this possibility". An article from Frankfurter Allgemeine Zeitung talks about Victor Ponta's involvement in the seemingly accidental death of Panait, who apparently suffered a lethal accident soon after meeting with Ponta.

Monica Macovei, who served as Justice Minister between 2004 and 2007, stated that she was skeptical about the correctness of the investigation into Cristian Panait's death.

== Movie adaptation ==
The case received major mainstream attention after the announcement made by Tudor Giurgiu that he will direct a fictionalized film adaptation based on the story. The film was released in 2015 as Why Me?.
