= Carmen Tănase =

Romanian actress

Carmen Tanase
- Born: Carmen Elena Tanase; January 18, 1961 (age 64); Ploiesti, Romania
- Website: carmentanase.ro

Carmen Tanase (born January 18, 1961) is a Romanian actress. After graduating The Drama and Film Institute from Bucharest, in 1984, she joined the company of "Vasile Alecsandri" National Theatre in Iaşi (between 1984 and 1990) and then moved back to the capital city of Romania. Since 1990, she is a member of the Odeon Theatre company from Bucharest. As a student, she played in Dostoevsky's The Possessed (a dramatization of the great Russian novel), in John Steinbeck's Sweet Thursday, in Butterflies, Butterflies by the Italian playwright Aldo Nicolaj (at The Very Small Theatre in Bucharest, having the legendary Romanian actress Olga Tudorache and Radu Duda, the would-be Prince of Hohenzollern-Veringen, as partners) etc. Following the fall of the Romanian communist regime, in 1989 (the end of Nicolae Ceauşescu's dictatorship), she also involved herself in the independent artistic movements that flourished after these events. She toured the world with Radu Duda, the two of them playing in A Report to an Academy, the adaptation of a short story by Franz Kafka, directed by Cristina Iovita (the play was produced by the first Romanian independent theatrical group formed after the 1989 Revolution).

== Stage credits (selected) ==
Teatrelli, Bucharest

- Diana in California Suite by Neil Simon, directed by Gelu Colceag

Comedy Theatre, Bucharest

- Polina Andreevna in The Seagull by Anton Chekhov, directed by Claudiu Goga

Odeon Theatre, Bucharest

- Dr. Martha Livingstone in Agnes of God by John Pielmeier, directed by Marius Oltean
- The chief nurse in Veronika Decides To Die, adaptation by Gelu Colceag and George Banica after the homonymous novel by Paulo Coelho, directed by Gelu Colceag
- Colette Duduleanu in The Rattlers by Al. Kiritescu, directed by Alexandru Dabija
- Lora in Stars In The Morning Light by Alexandr Galin, directed by Gelu Colceag
- Paraschiva in Miss Nastasia by G.M. Zamfirescu, directed by Horea Popescu
- Pierette in The Gossip Ladies by Michel Tremblay, directed by Petre Bokor
- The old gipsy woman in At The Gipsy Women by Cristian Popescu, based on the short story by Mircea Eliade, directed by Alexander Hausvater
- …And They Put Handcuffs On The Flowers… by Fernando Arrabal, directed by Alexander Hausvater
- The Grin Opera by Dario Fo, directed by Dragos Galgotiu

National Theatre, Iasi

- Mona in A Nameless Star by Mihail Sebastian, directed by Nicoleta Toia
- She in The Boa's Strategy after A.P. Chekhov, directed by Nicoleta Toia
- Gittel in Two for the Seesaw by William Gibson, directed by Ion Manzatu
- Firuta in The Author Is In The Auditorium by Ion Baiesu, directed by Saul Taisler
- Zita in A Stormy Night by I.L. Caragiale, directed by Ovidiu Lazar
- Helen in Warsaw Melody by L. Zorin, directed by Ion Manzatu
- Ana in The Game Of Life And Death by Horia Lovinescu, directed by Nicoleta Toia
- Mrs Gabor in Spring's Awakening by Frank Wedekind, directed by Cristina Iovita

== Selected filmography ==
- May's Fever (short film), directed by Tudor Parhon, 2010
- State și Flacăra - Vacanță la Nisa, directed by Iura Luncasu, 2010
- State de Romania - student la Sorbona, directed by Iura Luncasu, 2009
- Knot, directed by Alina Ciocarlie, 2007
- Tears Of Love, directed by Iura Luncasu, 2006
- Too Late, directed by Adi Sitaru, 2006
- Love Sick, directed by Tudor Giurgiu, 2006
- Dormir avec le diable, directed by Yves Boisset, 2001
- Une femme piégée, directed by Laurent Carceles, 2001
- Im Zeichen der Liebe, directed by Kathe Kratz, 1995
- Passion Mortelle, directed by Claude-Michel Rome, 1995
- Babe, Maa (Romanian dubbing), directed by Chris Noonan, 1995
- Dark Angel: The Ascent, directed by Linda Hassani, 1994
- È pericoloso sporgersi, directed by Nae Caranfil, 1994
- The Cathouse, directed by Andrei Blaier, 1993
- I'm Going Mad And I'm Sorry, directed by Ion Gostin, 1992
- The Dogs Way, directed by Laurentiu Damian, 1991
- The Culprit, directed by Alexa Visarion, 1991
- A Clod of Clay, directed by Nicolae Margineanu, 1989
- Misterele Bucurestilor, directed by Doru Nastase, 1983

== Television credits ==
- Mara Anghel in Pariu cu viața, directed by Iura Luncașu, Alex Fotea and Alex Borundel, 2011 - 2013, and O nouă viață, directed by Alex Fotea and Mihai Brătilă, 2014.
- Flacara Potcovaru in Gipsy Heart, Regina, State de Romania, Mostenirea (TV series), directed by Iura Luncasu, Alexandru Fotea and Sebastian Voinea/ Larry Maronese; Iura Luncasu, Larry Maronese, Vladimir Anton; Larry Maronese, Mihai Bratila, Iura Luncasu, 2007–2008, 2008–2009, 2009–2010, 2010–2011.
- Zuzu in A Movie-like Romance (TV series), directed by Iura Luncasu and Bogdan Dumitrescu, 2006-2007
- Simona Varlam in Tears of Love (TV series), directed by Iura Luncasu and Bogdan Dumitrescu, 2005-2006
