= Rudeni =

Rudeni may refer to several villages in Romania:

- Rudeni, a village in Mihăeşti Commune, Argeș County
- Rudeni, a village in Șuici Commune, Argeș County
- Rudeni, a village in the town of Chitila, Ilfov County
