= Milionari de weekend =

2004 film by Cătălin Saizescu

- Directed by: Cătălin Saizescu
- Starring: Tudor Chirilă; Maria Dinulescu; Andi Vasluianu
- Release date: 29 October 2004
- Running time: 90 minutes
- Country: Romania
- Language: Romanian

Milionari de weekend (Weekend Millionaires) is a 2004 Romanian comedy film directed by Cătălin Saizescu.

== Cast ==
- Tudor Chirilă - Godzi
- Maria Dinulescu - Miki
- Andi Vasluianu - computerist Zetu
- Mihai Bendeac - barman Alex
- George Alexandru - Merțanu
- Nicodim Ungureanu - Chioru
- Bogdan Dumitrescu - Paulică
- Mihai Verbițchi - Boris

== Awards ==
Milionari de weekend won the UARF Award for best debut feature film (2005).
