= Dacian fortress of Racoș =

- Location within Romania
- 46.0233°N 25.4206°E
- Location: Dealul Vărăriei, Dealul Cornului, Racoș, Brașov County, Romania

Site notes
- Condition: Ruined

Monument istoric
- Reference no.: BV-I-s-A-11282

The Dacian fortress of Racoș was a Dacian fortified town in Romania.
