= Parking (2019 film) =

2019 romantic drama film by Tudor Giurgiu

- Film poster
- Directed by: Tudor Giurgiu
- Written by: Tudor Giurgiu; Marin Mălaicu-Hondrari
- Based on: Apropierea by Marin Mălaicu-Hondrari
- Starring: Mihai Smarandache; Belén Cuesta; Ariadna Gil; Luis Bermejo
- Production companies: Libra Film Productions; Tito Clint Movies; La Claqueta; Evolution Films
- Release date: June 14, 2019 (TIFF)
- Running time: 110 minutes
- Countries: Romania; Spain; Czech Republic
- Languages: Spanish; Romanian
- Box office: $50,853

Parking is a 2019 internationally co-produced romantic drama film directed by Tudor Giurgiu. It is based on the novel Apropierea by Marin Mălaicu-Hondrari who co-wrote the screenplay along Giurgiu. It stars Mihai Smarandache, Belén Cuesta, Ariadna Gil and Luis Bermejo.

== Plot ==
The story is set in 2002 and revolves around Adrian (Smarandache), a Romanian undocumented immigrant who works as a security guard at a parking lot in Córdoba, Spain.

== Cast ==
- Mihai Smarandache as Adrian
- Belén Cuesta as María
- Luis Bermejo as Rafael
- Ariadna Gil
- Manuel Bandera

== Production ==
The film was produced by Libra Film alongside La Claqueta PC, Tito Clint Movies and Evolution Films, with support of MEDIA, Eurimages, the CNC the Junta de Andalucía and Canal Sur TV.

== Release ==
The film premiered on June 14, 2019 as the opener of 18th Transilvania International Film Festival (TIFF). It was released on demand on Filmin on May 15, 2020.

== Awards and nominations ==
It was nominated for eight categories at the 2020 Gopo Awards, including Best Film.
