= Ionuț Chirilă =

Romanian football manager

Personal information
- Full name: Ion Ștefan Chirilă
- Date of birth: 9 January 1966 (age 60)
- Place of birth: Bucharest, Romania

Team information
- Current team: CS Dinamo București (head coach)

Managerial career
- Years: Team
- 1987–1996: Dinamo București U19
- 1996–1997: Dinamo București (assistant)
- 1997–2000: Rapid București U19
- 2001–2002: Electromagnetica București
- 2002–2004: Unirea Focșani
- 2005: Jiul Petroșani
- 2008: UTA Arad
- 2013–2014: Concordia Chiajna
- 2014: CSMS Iași
- 2017: ASA Târgu Mureș
- 2021: Academica Clinceni
- 2026–: CS Dinamo București

Ion "Ionuț" Ștefan Chirilă (born 9 January 1966) is a Romanian professional football manager, who is currently in charge of Liga II club CS Dinamo București. He is the son of journalist Ioan Chirilă and actress Iarina Demian and brother to the singer Tudor Chirilă.
