= Monica Bîrlădeanu =

Romanian actress and model

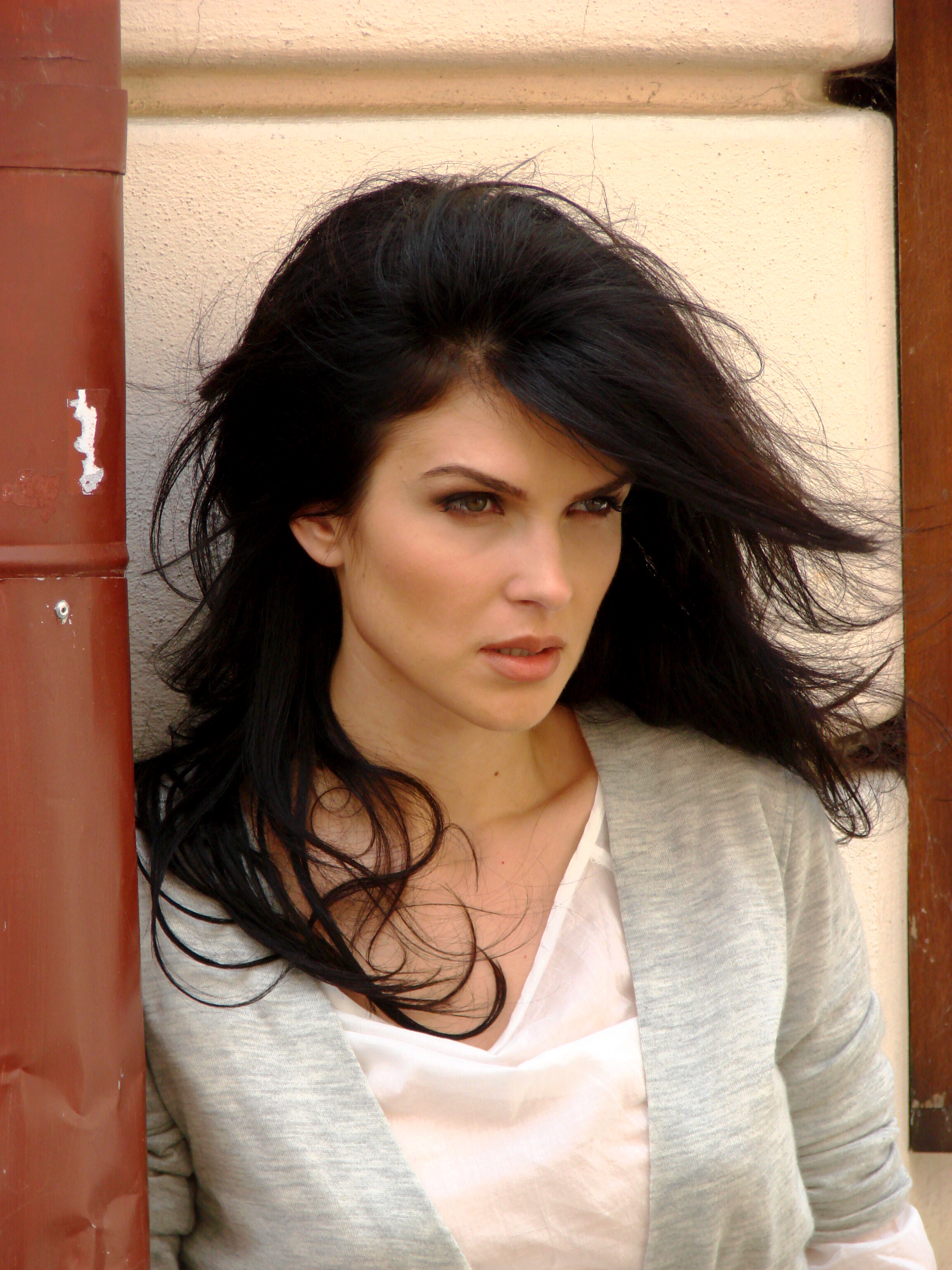
- Born: Monica Elena Bîrlădeanu; 12 December 1978 (age 47); Iași, Socialist Republic of Romania
- Occupations: Actress; model

Monica Elena Bîrlădeanu (Romanian pronunciation: [moˈnika bɨrləˈde̯anu]; born December 12, 1978), professionally known as Monica Dean, is a Romanian actress and model.

== Career ==
Born in Iași, she studied law at the University of Iași. Bîrlădeanu was a popular television host before accepting her first film role in 2004. In 2005, she played a nurse in the award-winning feature The Death of Mr. Lazarescu. In 2006, she guest starred in the hit United States television show Lost in the episode "The Hunting Party", as Gabriela, a wealthy Italian woman. In 2005, she starred in the horror movie Incubus.

In November 2002, Bîrlădeanu was designated the most beautiful Romanian celebrity by Beau Monde, and in December she was chosen "The Sexiest TV Star" by TV Mania, one of the most influential Romanian TV guides. Her show went on, and so did the series of awards she got. In February 2003, the VIVA magazine designated her "The Most Beautiful Romanian Woman" and in July FHM "crowned" her as "Sexiest Woman". In December, she was, once again, awarded by TV Mania as "The Sexiest TV Celebrity".

In the meantime, she hosted Extravacanzza. 2004 began with a new challenge: the Viața in Direct (Life Live) show.

In February 2004 Viva designated her again as the "Sexiest Celebrity" and in December 2004 she was once more named TV Manias "Sexiest TV Star". In 2004 she went to Los Angeles to take acting classes and improve her TV hosting skills. Her career took a new turn: she started doing movies.

In 2004, she played a teenager in the comedy Buds for Life, and by year's end she received a role in her first Romanian movie, The Death of Mr. Lazarescu. The film has so far obtained more than 30 awards, including Un certain regard at the 2005 Cannes Film Festival and a Silver Hugo in Chicago. It was nominated for Best Foreign Film at the 2005 Independent Spirit Awards.

== Filmography ==
- Taximetriști (2023) .... Anișoara
- Closer to the Moon (2014) .... Sonia Rosenthal
- Of Snails and Men (2012) ....
- Diaz (2012) ....
- Out of the Night (2011) .... Lia
- Maternity Blues (2011) .... Eloisa
- Angel of Evil (2010) .... Nicoletta
- Francesca (2009) .... Francesca
- Living & Dying (2007) .... Det. Lascar
- Fall Down Dead (2007) .... Helen Ritter
- Second in Command (2006) .... Dr. Johnson
- Incubus (2006) .... Karen
- Caved In (2006) TV movie .... Sophie
- The Death of Mr. Lazarescu (2005) .... Mariana
- Buds for Life (2004) .... Stephanie

=== Television ===
- Groapa (2023).... Manuela Vlahu
- Vlad (2019).... Carla
- Nip/Tuck (2006) .... Attractive Organ Thief - 1 episode - "Shari Noble"
- Lost (2006) .... Gabriela - 1 episode - "The Hunting Party"
- Lombarzilor 8 (2006) .... Ana
- CSI (2014) .... Mystery Woman/Emily Grey - 1 episode - "Boston Brakes"

=== Video ===
- Maica Domnului de la parter (2010) .... Doctor
- Stopover (2010) .... Ingrid
