= Ioan Chirilă =

Romanian sports broadcaster and sports writer

- Born: 25 October 1925; Izmail, Kingdom of Romania
- Died: 21 November 1999 (aged 74); Bucharest, Romania
- Other name: Nea Vanea
- Occupation: Sports journalist
- Spouse: Iarina Demian (m. 1963)
- Children: Ionuț Chirilă, Tudor Chirilă
- Writing career
- Years active: 1951–1999

Ioan Chirilă (25 October 1925 – 21 November 1999) was a Romanian sports broadcaster and sports writer. The Ioan Chirilă Awards are named in his honour. He was married to actress Iarina Demian with whom he had two sons: Ionuț who is a football coach and Tudor who is a singer.
