= Sergio Tiempo =

Venezuelan-Argentine musician

Sergio Daniel Tiempo (born February 24, 1972) is a Venezuelan-Argentine classical pianist.

== Biography ==
Born in Caracas, Venezuela, Sergio Tiempo began playing the piano at an early age. His first teacher was his mother, Lyl Tiempo, who began teaching him before he turned three. He achieved early acclaim by appearing on Argentine television when he was four years old and gave concerts in London and France at age seven.

In 1980, eight years old, he received special recognition at the Ealing Music Festival (London). In 1985, he performed at Doelen Concert Hall in Rotterdam with his older sister Karin Lechner who was born in Buenos Aires in 1965. They performed music by Mozart, Bizet, Milhaud, and Infante. This concert was recorded live and issued on LP and CD. In the following year, 1986, he was awarded the Alex De Vries prize, named after the Belgian pianist of Dutch origin. That same year he gave a solo recital at the Concertgebouw. This live performance was recorded as well and released on LP and CD.

His list of teachers has included Tessa Nicholson, Maria Curcio, Pierre Sancan, Michel Béroff, Jacques Detiege, Alan Weiss, and Nelson Freire. He has also attended the International Piano Academy Lake Como, where he worked with Dimitri Bashkirov, Fou Ts'ong, Murray Perahia, and Dietrich Fischer-Dieskau. He has also been taught by and performed with Argentine pianist Martha Argerich. Argerich remains one of his staunchest supporters.

Since his emergence in 1986, Tiempo has performed and recorded regularly all over the world. His tours have included frequent trips to Japan, recitals in many of the greatest European concert halls, and performances in numerous North American cities. He frequently participates in music festivals, including the Progetto Martha Argerich, where he performs every year. He also performs regularly with his sister, Karin Lechner. Among his most significant chamber-music collaborations are recordings and performances with the cellist Mischa Maisky, whose daughter, Lily Maisky, a concert pianist, has studied piano with Tiempo's mother.

He has recorded several collections of classical music, and has received particular praise for his interpretation of Gaspard de la nuit by Ravel and for his versions of the Chopin Nocturnes.
