= East Side Stories =

2010 film

- Directed by: Márk Bodzsár; Csaba Bollók; Szabolcs Hajdu; Ferenc Török
- Written by: Márk Bodzsár; Csaba Bollók; Szabolcs Hajdu; Ferenc Török
- Produced by: István Bodzsár
- Starring: Mari Csomós
- Release date: 2010
- Running time: 90 minutes
- Country: Hungary
- Language: Hungarian

East Side Stories is a 2010 Hungarian drama film, which was composed of four short films, each with a different director.

== Cast ==
- Mari Csomós
- Dezső Garas
- Ervin Nagy
- Csilla Radnay
- Judit Rezes
- Roland Rába
- Péter Telekes
- Zsolt Trill
- Anita Tóth
- Orsolya Török-Illyés
- Andi Vasluianu
