= Why Me? (2015 film) =

2015 film

- Film poster
- Directed by: Tudor Giurgiu
- Written by: Tudor Giurgiu
- Starring: Emilian Oprea
- Release date: 6 February 2015 (Berlin)
- Running time: 125 minutes
- Country: Romania
- Language: Romanian

Why Me? (Romanian: De ce eu?) is a 2015 Romanian drama film directed by Tudor Giurgiu. It was screened in the Panorama section of the 65th Berlin International Film Festival. It is a fictional film inspired by the professional experience of Cristian Panait.

== Cast ==
- Emilian Oprea as Cristian Panduru
- Mihai Constantin as Codrea
- Andreea Vasile as Dora
- Dan Condurache as Iustin Petrut
- Liviu Pintileasa as Ionut
- Mihai Smarandache as Serban
- Alin Florea as Bogdan Leca
