= Raluca Saita =

Romanian film editor

Raluca Saita (born October 9, 1979, in Bucharest) is a Romanian film editor.

== Biography ==
Raluca Saita is a film editor working in narrative, television and documentary, with over 8 years experience and an artistically background which complements her film education. From the age of 13 Raluca attends the art high school where she studies history of art, drawing and painting, and in 2002 she earns a BFA in Film Editing at The National University of Theater and Film in Bucharest (Awarded “Best Film School” at 2000 Munchen and Karlovy Vary Film Festivals). In 2009 she graduates The Edit Center in New York City and earns a Certificate of Art of Editing.

After receiving the BFA in Film Editing she works on several short movies and begins her work as an assistant film editor on features. Also after a few years Raluca has her own editing studio and starts freelancing for the largest production company in Romania, MediaPro Pictures, working on TV series and TV features. In the same time starts working on her first feature as a film editor "Emigrant", and also travels to New York where she edits as an assistant editor, some of the scenes for the movie The Winning Season, directed by James C. Strouse, starring Sam Rockwell and Emma Roberts, at The Edit Center.

Her editing work expands from shorts to features, narrative and documentary to TV series, indies and studio productions. Also Raluca works as a sound designer for some of the projects and in 2001 she wins Best Sound Award at the University's Film Festival.

== Filmography ==
=== Editorial Department ===
- The Winning Season (2009) directed by James C. Strouse
- Emigrant (2009) directed by Florin Serban
- One Second of Life (2009) directed by Ioan Carmazan
- The J.H. Gunn Project (2009) directed by Shequeta Smith
- Un film Simplu (2008) directed by Tom Gatsoulis
- Cu un pas inainte (25 episodes, 2007) directed by Jesus del Cerro
- Africa Straight on Ice (2007)directed by Razvan Muraru
- Razbunarea (2006) directed by Adrian Sitaru
- Barbatul sotului meu (2006) directed by Radu Apostol
- A doua sansa (2006) directed by Adrian Sitaru
- Inocenta furata (2006) directed by Alex Fotea
- Pretul iubirii (2006) directed by Corina Radu
- Cu inima indoita (2006) directed by Ioan Carmazan
- Mama dupa ora 5 (2006) directed by Radu Apostol
- Invat sa fiu mama ta (2006) directed by Adrian Batista
- Dusmanul din casa (2006) directed by Peter Kerek
- E dreptul meu! (2006) directed by Corina Radu
- O lume a durerii (2006) directed by Mihai Bauman
- Niciodata nu e prea tarziu (2006) directed by Alex Berceanu
- Dragoste de mama (2006) directed by Ioan Carmazan
- Mincinoasa (2006) directed by Adrian Sitaru
- Continuitatea parcurilor (2006) directed by Radu Barbulescu
- Băieți buni (2005) directed by Bogdan Barbulescu
- Italiencele (2004) directed by Napoleon Helmis
- Munceste acum! (2002) directed by Ion Puican
- Conserve de familie (2001) directed by Ion Puican
- The Flash (2001) directed by Andrei Butica
- Mecano (2001) directed by Cristian Nemescu
- Golem (2001) directed by Anatol Reghintovschi
- Millenium (1999) directed by Adrian Alpentopp
- Museum (1999) directed by Ion Puican
- The Table (1998) directed by Ion Puican

=== Sound Department ===
- The Flash (2001) directed by Andrei Butica
- Mecano (2001) directed by Cristian Nemescu
- Golem (2001) directed by Anatol Reghintovschi
- Millenium (1999) directed by Adrian Alpentopp
- Museum (1999) directed by Ion Puican
- The Table (1998) directed by Ion Puican

== Awards ==
2001 - Best Sound Prize - International Student Film Festival CineMAiubit
