= Love Sick (film) =

- Movie poster
- Directed by: Tudor Giurgiu
- Written by: Răzvan Rădulescu; Cecilia Stefanescu
- Produced by: Tudor Giurgiu
- Starring: Maria Popistașu; Ioana Barbu; Tudor Chirilă
- Cinematography: Alexandru Sterian
- Edited by: Alexandru Radu
- Music by: Vlaicu Golcea
- Distributed by: Transilvania Film
- Release dates: 13 February 2006 (Germany); 17 March 2006 (Romania); 8 June 2006 (US); 1 April 2007 (UK)
- Running time: 86 minutes
- Countries: Romania; France
- Language: Romanian
- Budget: €350,000 (estimated)

Love Sick (Romanian: Legături bolnăvicioase, "Sickly relationships") is a 2006 Romanian drama film directed by Tudor Giurgiu. It is a lesbian-themed love story that has been compared to My Summer of Love.

== Plot ==
Alex and Cristina (Kiki) are university students who end up living in the same building. Their friendship develops quickly, overcoming several phases, from fellowship to care and tenderness. While the two are very different, the two girls get along fine, except for the moments when a third character shows up — Sandu. Kiki's brother is permanently tormented by an unnatural jealousy which implies an incestuous liaison between the two siblings.

== Cast ==
- Maria Popistașu as Kiki
- Ioana Barbu as Alex
- Tudor Chirilă as Sandu
- Catalina Murgea as Mrs. Benes
- Mircea Diaconu as Mr. Dragnea
- Virginia Mirea as Mrs. Dragnea
- Tora Vasilescu as Mrs. Parvulescu
- Valentin Popescu as Mr. Parvulescu
- Mihai Dinvale as Prof. Mihailescu
- Carmen Tănase as Waitress
- Puya as Taxi driver
- Mihaela Rădulescu as Mrs. Negulescu
- Robert Paschall Jr. as Bo

== Background ==
The film was adapted from a novel by Cecilia Stefanescu.

== Awards ==
- Love Sick shared the grand jury prize in November 2006 at the 19th edition of the Image+Nation Festival, Montreal, Canada's LGBT Film Festival.
- Actress Maria Popistasu won Jury Special Award for Performance at the 'Anonimul' International Film Festival in Romania.
- Actress Ioana Barbu won Best Actress at the Pécs International Film Festival.

== Distribution ==
It premiered at the 2006 Berlin International Film Festival as part of the Teddy Awards. It went on to appear at a number of international film festivals including the Seattle International Film Festival and the London Lesbian and Gay Film Festival.

== See also ==
- Romanian New Wave
