= Of Snails and Men =

- Film poster
- Romanian: Despre oameni și melci
- Directed by: Tudor Giurgiu
- Starring: Andi Vasluianu; Monica Bîrlădeanu
- Release date: 14 September 2012
- Running time: 93 minutes
- Country: Romania
- Language: Romanian

Of Snails and Men (Romanian: Despre oameni și melci) is a 2012 Romanian comedy film directed by Tudor Giurgiu.

== Cast ==
- Andi Vasluianu as George
- Monica Bîrlădeanu as Manuela
- Dorel Vișan as Vladimir
- Jean-François Stévenin as Robert
- Robinson Stévenin as Olivier
- Andreea Bibiri as Ana
