= George Alexandru =

Romanian actor

- Born: George Alexandru; 21 November 1957; Bucharest, Romania
- Died: 1 January 2016 (aged 58); Fundeni Hospital, Bucharest
- Education: Caragiale Academy of Theatrical Arts and Cinematography
- Occupations: Stage actor Film actor

George Alexandru (Romanian pronunciation: [ˈdʒe̯ordʒe alekˈsandru]; 21 November 1957 – 1 January 2016) was a Romanian film and theater actor.

== Filmography ==
- Ecaterina Teodoroiu (1978)
- Ultima noapte de dragoste (1980)
- Dreptate în lanțuri (1983)
- Masca de argint (1985)
- Noi, cei din linia întâi (1985)
- Figuranții (1987)
- François Villon - Poetul vagabond (1987)
- Drumeț în calea lupilor (1988)
- Rezervă la start (1988)
- Mircea (1989)
- Cenușa păsării din vis (1989)
- Coroana de foc (1990)
- Escu (1990) - film TV
- Drumul câinilor (1991)
- Cezara (1991)
- Cum vă place? (1992)
- Înnebunesc și-mi pare rău (1992)
- Balanța (1992)
- Rămânerea (1992)
- Chira Chiralina (1993)
- Vulpe - vânător (1993)
- Polul Sud (1993)
- Oglinda (1994)
- E pericoloso sporgersi (1994)
- Asfalt Tango (1995)
- Huntress: Spirit of the Night (1995)
- Punctul zero (1996)
- Omul zilei (1997)
- Triunghiul Morții (1999)
- Faimosul paparazzo (1999)
- În fiecare zi Dumnezeu ne sărută pe gură (2001)
- Dulcea saună a morții (2003)
- Milionari de weekend (2004)
- Sindromul Timișoara - Manipularea (2004)
- Băieți buni (serial TV, 2005)
- Un espresso (2005)
- Happy End (2006)
- La urgență (serial TV, 2006)
- Cu un pas înainte (serial TV, 2008)
- Supraviețuitorul (2008)
- Nunta mută (2008)
- Casanova, identitate feminină (2008)
