= The Rage (2002 film) =

- Directed by: Radu Muntean
- Written by: Mircea Stăiculescu; Radu Muntean; Ileana Constantin
- Produced by: Andrei Boncea
- Starring: Dragos Bucur; Dorina Chiriac; Andi Vasluianu
- Cinematography: Vivi Drăgan Vasile
- Edited by: Valentin Obretin
- Music by: Vlaicu Golcea; Electric Brother
- Release date: 29 November 2002
- Running time: 83 minutes
- Country: Romania
- Language: Romanian

The Rage (Romanian: Furia) is a 2002 Romanian thriller film directed by Radu Muntean, starring Dragoș Bucur and Dorina Chiriac. It tells the story of two street racers who struggle to be able to pay a debt in time. The film premiered in Romanian cinemas on 29 November 2002. It recorded 53,372 admissions in its home country.

Bucur received the Best Actor award from the Romanian Union of Filmmakers.

== Plot summary ==
Two young men participate in illegal car races in a city full of illegal racing. They work together as a team and thrive from their business, but when a local businessman asks them to lose a race, things start to get ugly. They have to pay off a $7,000 debt within 24 hours after winning an illegal car race they were supposed to lose. An action-packed film with touches of black humor, satirizing a society where ruins are run, where life is just currency.

== Cast ==
- Dragoș Bucur as Luca
- Dorina Chiriac as Mona
- Andi Vasluianu as Felie
- Nicodim Ungureanu as red car driver
- Emilia Dobrin as Luca's mother
- Adrian Minune as Adrian Wonderkid
- Bogdan Uritescu as Suca
