= Băieți buni =

- Created by: Andrei Boncea
- Starring: Dragoș Bucur; Cabral Ibaka; Florin Călinescu; Ștefan Bănică, Jr. Răzvan Vasilescu
- Country of origin: Romania
- No. of episodes: 8

Production
- Running time: approx. 50 min

Original release
- Network: ProTV
- Release: 24 April – 12 June 2005

Băieți buni is a 2005 Romanian 8-episode police drama television miniseries which centers on the efforts of two police inspectors (played by Dragoș Bucur and Cabral Ibaka) to bring down a far-reaching criminal network.

Tagline: Legea coboară în stradă (Bringing the law to the street)

== Cast ==
=== Main cast ===
Actor	Part	Episode
1	2	3	4	5	6	7	8
Dragoș Bucur	Inspector Călin Boboc
Cabral Ibaka	Inspector Eduard Bălan
Florin Călinescu	Comisar Anton Marcu
Ștefan Bănică, Jr.	Răzvan Dragomir - "Ciupanezu'"
Răzvan Vasilescu	Procuror Cornel Caragea
Cosmina Păsărin	"Guvida"
Anne Marie Paraschivescu	Avocat Corina Marcu
Bogdan Talașman	"Matrix"
Ioana Flora	Agent special Otilia Teodor - "Miki"
Dragoș Stemate	Detectiv Bolec
Ion Grosu	Detectiv Iulian Filipache
Tudor Aaron Istodor	Dinu Caragea
George Alexandru	Igor Stepanov
Ovidiu Niculescu	Tănase Oanță - "Bilă"

=== Guest stars ===
Actor	Part	Episode
1	2	3	4	5	6	7	8
Cristian Iacob	Nelu Ion - "Rotulă"
Mircea Anca	"Francezu'"
Emil Hoștină	Dan Preda - "Legionarul"
Vlad Gorneanu	Gino
Mihai Dinvale	Senator Victor Mateescu
Ioana Abur	Elena Mateescu
Andi Vasluianu	Relu
Cristian Popa	Fotograful
Rodica Lazăr	Vera Tomescu
Dana Comnea	The Grandmother
Dina Cocea	Aglaia

=== Additional cast ===
Actor	Part	Episode
1	2	3	4	5	6	7	8
Dan Aștilean	Chestor Mihai Trăznea
Alexandru Jitea	Lazăr
Iulian Enache	Valentin Mazăre - "Cazan"
Eugen Giuglea	Alexandru Dumitraș - "Rangă"
Mihai Călin	Ben
Ramona Rusu	Diana Boboc
Vitalie Ursu	Alioșa
Petru Ciobanu	Serghei
Dan Tomescu	Iulius Trandafir
Alexandru Bindea	Avocat Valerian Grigoriu
Cristian Toma	Subagent Nicolae Stemate
Roxana Ciuhulescu	Ramona
Toma Cuzin	"Fisă"
Mihai Antoci	"Ulei"
Gelu Nițu	Doctorul
Adriana Nicolae	Studenta
Sabina Brândușe	Paula Secui
Adriana Șchiopu	Lucreția Marcu
Petru Lupu	Nea Tică
Gabriel Fătu	Detectiv Cerbu
Antoaneta Glodeanu	Ramona's grandmother

== Episode guide ==
=== Legea coboară în stradă ===
Aired: 24 April 2005
Edited by: Dan Moga
Written by: Ovidiu Niculescu, Sorin Tofan, Marius Șerbu, Cătălin Rotaru, Minerva Teodorescu, Dan Mușețoiu, Bogdan Mihilescu
Directed by: Bogdan Bărbulescu

=== Pentru prietenul meu, Francezul ===
Aired: 1 May 2005
Edited by: Tudor Bota
Written by: Ovidiu Niculescu, Sorin Tofan, Marius Șerbu, Cătălin Rotaru, Minerva Teodorescu, Dan Mușețoiu, Bogdan Mihilescu
Directed by: Bogdan Dumitrescu

=== Lovește cu furie ===
Aired: 8 May 2005
Edited by: Tiberiu Teodorescu
Written by: Ovidiu Niculescu, Sorin Tofan, Minerva Teodorescu, Marius Șerbu
Directed by: Theodor Halacu Nicon

=== Mamutu' versus Beznă ===
Aired: 15 May 2005
Edited by: Tiberiu Teodorescu
Written by: Ovidiu Niculescu, Sorin Tofan, Minerva Teodorescu, Marius Șerbu
Directed by: Theodor Halacu Nicon

=== Război pentru Ciupanezul ===
Aired: 22 May 2005
Edited by: Lulu Supuran
Written by: Ovidiu Niculescu, Sorin Tofan, Minerva Teodorescu, Marius Șerbu
Directed by: Laurențiu Rusescu

=== Focuri, droguri și femei frumoase ===
Aired: 29 May 2005
Edited by: Tiberiu Teodorescu
Written by: Ovidiu Niculescu, Sorin Tofan, Minerva Teodorescu, Marius Șerbu
Directed by: Theodor Halacu Nicon

=== Operațiuni secrete ===
Aired: 5 June 2005
Edited by: Tiberiu Teodorescu
Written by: Ovidiu Niculescu, Sorin Tofan, Minerva Teodorescu, Marius Șerbu
Directed by: Theodor Halacu Nicon

=== Legături de sânge ===
Aired: 12 June 2005
Edited by: Raluca Saita
Written by: Ovidiu Niculescu, Sorin Tofan, Minerva Teodorescu, Marius Șerbu
Directed by: Bogdan Bărbulescu

== Title translation controversy ==
The title Băieți buni (literally Good Guys) clearly refers to the two police officers. In Romania, people rushed to translate the title to Goodfellas, which, technically, is a correct translation. However, due to the connotation of 'mobsters' brought to this term by the 1990 Martin Scorsese picture, the Goodfellas translation is clearly a mistake.
