= Racoș =

Racoș Alsórákos
- Commune
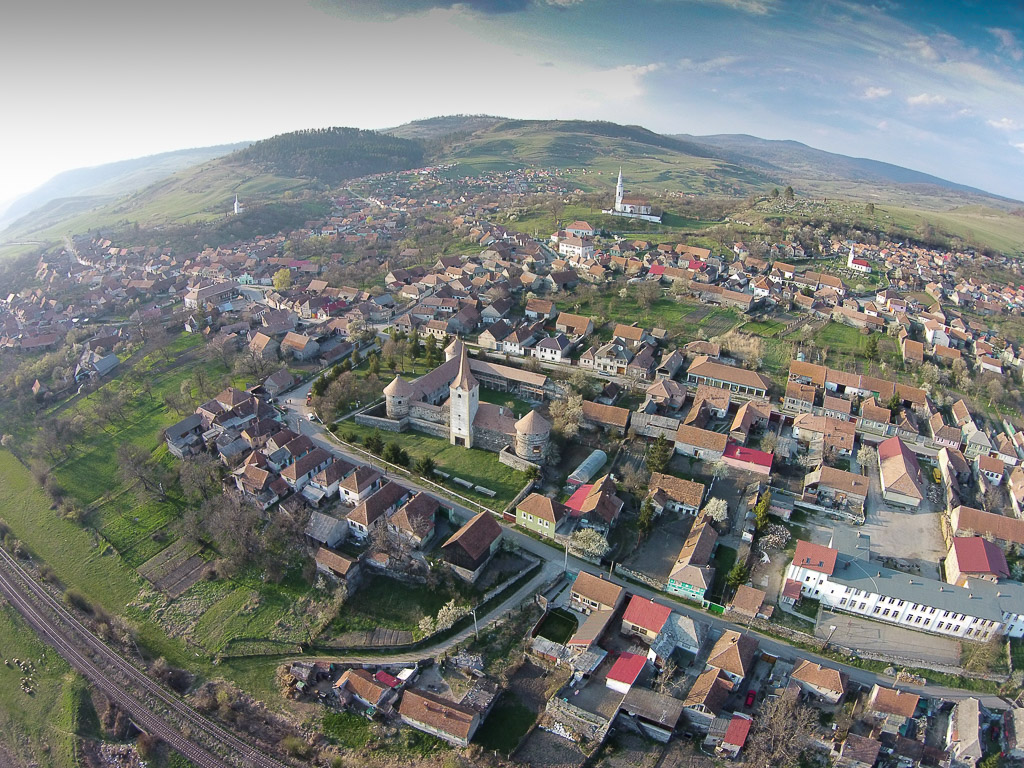

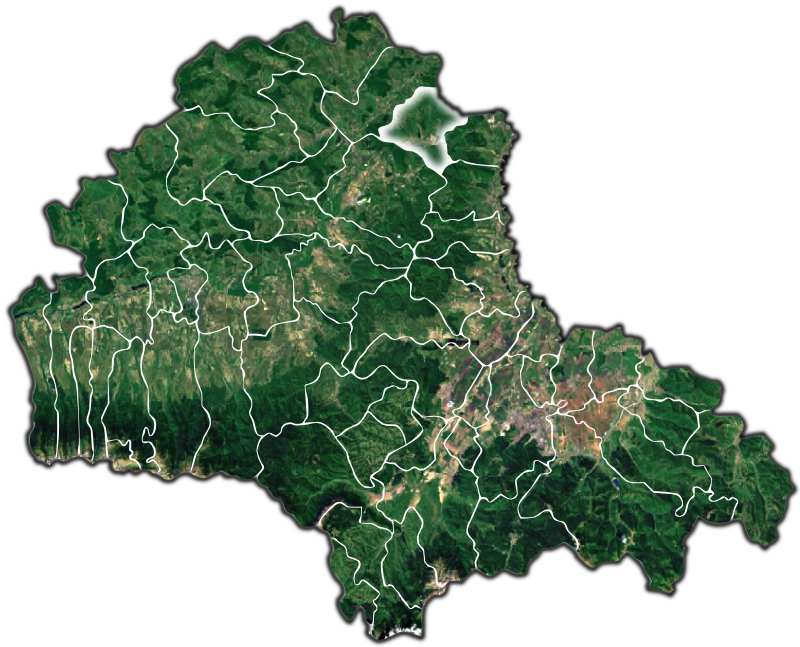
- Location within the county

- Location in Romania
- Coordinates: 46°1′N 25°24′E
- Country: Romania
- County: Brașov

Government
  - Mayor (2020–2024): Ion Epureanu (UDMR)
- Area: 77.78 km^{2} (30.03 sq mi)
- Elevation: 484 m (1,588 ft)
- Population (2021-12-01): 3,345
  - Density: 43.01/km^{2} (111.4/sq mi)
- Time zone: UTC+02:00 (EET)
  - Summer (DST): UTC+03:00 (EEST)
- Postal code: 507175
- Area code: +(40) 268
- Vehicle reg.: BV
- Website: comunaracos.ro

Racoș (also Racoșul de Jos; German: Unter-Krebsdorf; Hungarian: Alsórákos) is a commune in Brașov County, Transylvania, Romania. It is composed of two villages, Mateiaș (Mátéfalva) and Racoș.

The commune is located at the northern edge of the county, on the border with Covasna County, and near the border with Harghita County. It lies on the banks of the Olt River, 19 km (12 mi) from the town of Rupea and 63 km (39 mi) from the county seat, Brașov. There are train stations in both Racoș and Mateiaș that serve Line 300 of the CFR network, which connects Bucharest with the Hungarian border near Oradea.

The Racoș volcano is the oldest volcano in the region, and appears to be inactive. The commune is the site of the Racoșul de Jos nature preserve and of the Racoș basalt columns. The Cotul Turzunului nature preserve is partly situated on the territory of Racoș.

Historical population
Year	Pop.	±%
2002	3,178	—
2011	3,336	+5.0%
2021	3,345	+0.3%
Source: Census data

At the 2021 census, the commune had a population of 3,345; of those, 41.5% were Hungarians, 31.6% Roma, and 21% Romanians. At the 2011 census, there were 3,336 inhabitants; 55% were Hungarians, 23.2% Romanians, and 21.6% Roma. At the 2002 census, 33.4% were Reformed, 23.3% Romanian Orthodox, 21% Pentecostal, 17.7% Unitarian, and 3.6% Roman Catholic.

The ruins of a Dacian fortress are located in Racoș. Alongside this the Sükösd-Bethlen Castle is a historic monument, first attested in 1636 which is also located in Racoș inside a now park. Another tourist destination is the Emerald Lake.
