= Lily Maisky =

French pianist

- Born: 28 July 1987 (age 39); Paris, France
- Genres: classical
- Occupation: pianist
- Instrument: piano

Lily Maisky (born 28 July 1987 in Paris) is a classical pianist. She is the daughter of cellist Mischa Maisky.

== Early life ==
Maisky began playing the piano at the age of four with Lyl Tiempo and studied with Hagit Kerbel, Olga Mogilevsky, Valeria Szervansky, Ilana Davids and Alan Weiss.

She was a pupil at the “Purcell School of Music” between 2001 and 2004, where she also studied jazz piano.

== Professional life ==
Concert appearances have taken her throughout Europe as well as the Far East, and she has performed at many renowned festivals including Verbier Festival, Progetto Martha Argerich, Schleswig Holstein, Julian Rachlin and Friends and the International Kammermuziek Festival in Utrecht.

Maisky features on several Deutsche Grammophon and EMI recording releases, and has been frequently broadcast on European and Asian radio and television. She enjoys playing chamber music as well as solo piano and forms a regular duo with Mischa Maisky.

=== Reception ===
"Lily Maisky played with grace, vigour and composure proving how well rounded a musician she is (...) in true Russian style the Maiskys played expressively and it was enthusiastically received by the Edinburgh audience." Musical Criticism, Edinburgh International Festival

"Showing a maturity beyond her 21 years, Lily Maisky was an equal partner in a gritty and thrilling performance." The Scotsman

"... The single performance that really caught fire was that by Mischa and Lily Maisky, of Shostakovich's Cello Sonata in D minor." The Sunday Times

"Mischa and his daughter Lily, who is evidently a true musician, made music with deeply felt intimacy, in full agreement, and with the ideal magic of sound carried by common breathing. Two serious master musicians were to be admired." Die Welt

"As an experienced, sensitive but independent young pianist, Lily Maisky presented herself in Munich’s Prinzregententheatre as highly talented. One couldn’t imagine a more homogeneous duo. It was a through and through musical relationship, they inspired each other and even more often, they agreed with each other unspoken." Süddeutsche Zeitung

"... But even the pieces on which Argerich doesn't appear are superb, especially Shostakovich's "Piano Trio No. 1" with pianist Lily Maisky, violinist Alissa Margulis, and cellist Mischa Maisky." All Music Guide, referring to an EMI release of Progetto Martha Argerich.
