= Mischa Maisky =

Soviet-born Israeli cellist (born 1948)

- מישה מייסקי
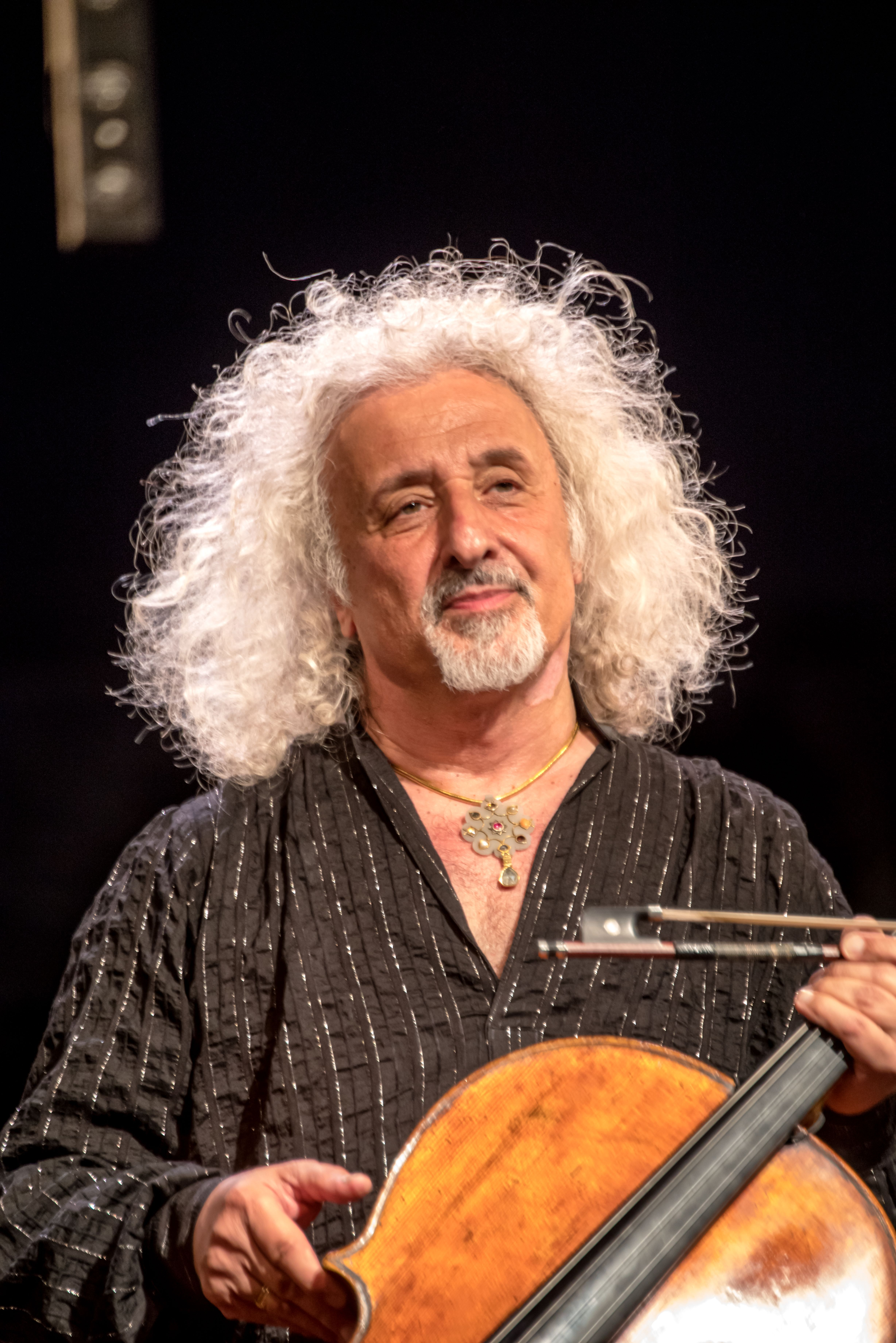
- Maisky in 2016
- Born: 10 January 1948 (age 78); Riga, Latvian SSR, Soviet Union
- Education: Moscow Conservatory
- Occupation: Classical cellist

Mischa Maisky (Latvian: Miša Maiskis, Hebrew: מישה מייסקי; né Mikhail Leopoldovich Maysky, Russian: Михаил Леопольдович Майский; born 10 January 1948) is a Soviet-born Israeli cellist.

== Biography ==
Mischa Maisky was born in 1948 in Riga and is the younger brother of organist, harpsichordist and musicologist Valery Maisky (1942–1981).

He was taught by Mstislav Rostropovich at the Moscow Conservatory from 1966 to 1970. In 1966, he won sixth prize at the International Tchaikovsky Competition in Moscow. In 1970, he was arrested and spent 18 months in jail and a work camp and later 2 months in mental hospital for buying a tape recorder on the black market to tape his cello lessons. He emigrated to Israel in 1972, where he holds citizenship. In 1974 he studied with Gregor Piatigorsky in Los Angeles. Maisky currently lives in Belgium.

Maisky has worked with artists including the pianists Martha Argerich, Khatia Buniatishvili, Radu Lupu, Nelson Freire, Peter Serkin, Evgeny Kissin, Lang Lang and Sergio Tiempo, the violinists Gidon Kremer, Itzhak Perlman, Vadim Repin, Maxim Vengerov, Joshua Bell, Julian Rachlin and Janine Jansen, and the conductors Leonard Bernstein, Zubin Mehta, David Zinman, Carlo Maria Giulini, Lorin Maazel, Riccardo Muti, Giuseppe Sinopoli, Yuri Temirkanov, Vladimir Ashkenazy, Daniel Barenboim, James Levine, Charles Dutoit, Mariss Jansons, Valery Gergiev, and Gustavo Dudamel among others.

Maisky first performed in the United States at Carnegie Hall in 1973. In 1976, he made his first performance in London and performed a recital with Radu Lupu the following year. He returned to Russia in 1995 to perform and record with Russian National Orchestra and Mikhail Pletnev.

In 2021 DG released box of 44 CDs with his complete recordings for the "Yellow Label".

== Personal life ==
Maisky has 6 children and has performed with the 3 oldest – pianists Lily and Maximilian and violinist Sascha.

== Recordings ==
Maisky's recordings include:

- Johann Sebastian Bach: Six Suites for Solo Cello BWV 1007–1012 [1985 Recording + 2000 Recording] (DG Deutsche Grammophon)
- Johann Sebastian Bach – 3 Sonatas for Viola da Gamba, with Martha Argerich (DG Deutsche Grammophon)
- Johannes Brahms: Double Concerto w. Gidon Kremer, Leonard Bernstein and Vienna PO (DG Deutsche Grammophon)
- Robert Schumann: Cello Concerto with Leonard Bernstein and Vienna PO (DG Deutsche Grammophon)
- Antonin Dvorak Concerto + Bloch "Schelomo" – with Leonard Bernstein and Israel PO (DG Deutsche Grammophon)
- Joseph Haydn: 3 Cello Concertos with Chamber Orchestra of Europe (DG Deutsche Grammophon)
- Vivaldi and Boccherini Concertos with the Orpheus Chamber Orchestra (DG Deutsche Grammophon)
- Dmitry Shostakovich: Cello Concertos with LSO and Michael Tilson Thomas
- Antonin Dvorak Cello Concerto and Richard Strauss Don Quixote with Zubin Mehta and Berlin PO
- Ludwig van Beethoven: Complete Cello Sonatas and Variations with Martha Argerich (DG Deutsche Grammophon)
- Edward Elgar: Cello Concerto; Tchaikovsky (DG Deutsche Grammophon)
- Maisky & Argerich Live in Japan (DG Deutsche Grammophon)
- Sergei Rachmaninoff: "Elégie" with Sergio Tiempo (DG Deutsche Grammophon)
- Meditation: an album of encore pieces dedicated to his daughter Lily (DG Deutsche Grammophon)
- "Adagio" – dedicated to his son Sascha (DG Deutsche Grammophon)
- Cellissimo: an album of encore pieces (DG Deutsche Grammophon)
- "Vocalise" – Russian Romances » – dedicated to his son Maximilian (DG Deutsche Grammophon)
- "España!" with Lily Maisky – dedicated to his son Manuel (DG Deutsche Grammophon)
- "Adagietto" – dedicated to his daughter Mila (DG Deutsche Grammophon)
- "20th Century Classics" – dedicated to his son Mateo (DG Deutsche Grammophon)

== Critical reception ==
There has been much controversy over Maisky's playing. Part of the public criticizes his extensive and often extreme use of vibrato and his generally loud playing. Another part feels that Maisky thus maintains a romantic quality – even when interpreting baroque music. A review by BBC Magazine writer Jan Smaczny stated "Maisky's performance of these works could hardly be bettered. Strauss's Sonata has enormous youthful élan, and the arrangements of the Romance for cello and orchestra and 'Morgen' are exquisite" (Morgen! Opus 27, Number 4. 1894, Richard Strauss).

Maisky accepts parts of the criticism of his technique, saying that he is "the kind of musician who tends to exaggerate a lot of things" and that he "could play more precise." Regarding this exaggerative instinct, Maisky commented: "I don't play for connoisseurs ... I think of people who are listening to this music for the first time in their lives, to help them to discover and notice and appreciate."
