= Șuici =

- Commune
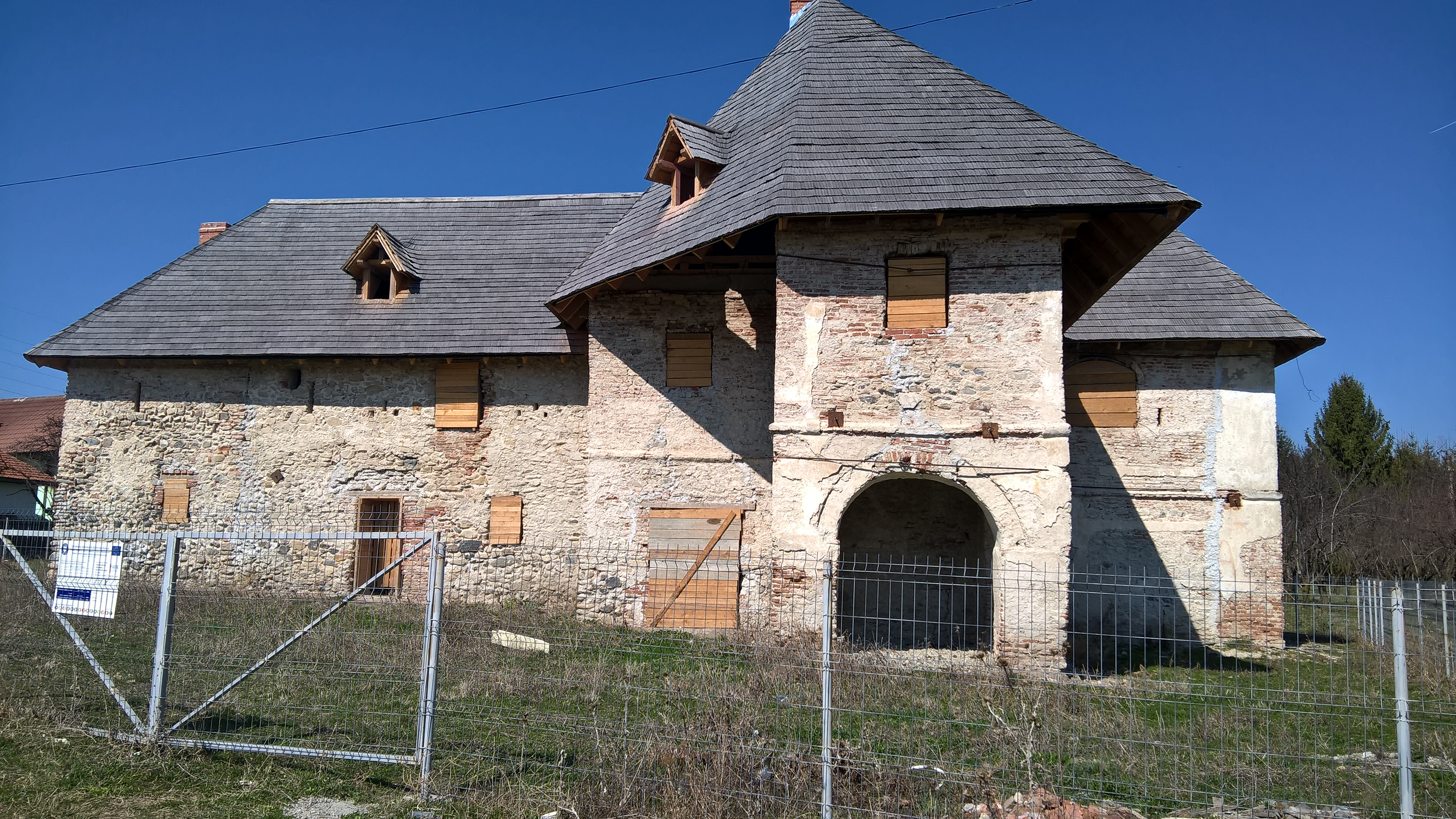
- Cula Sultănica

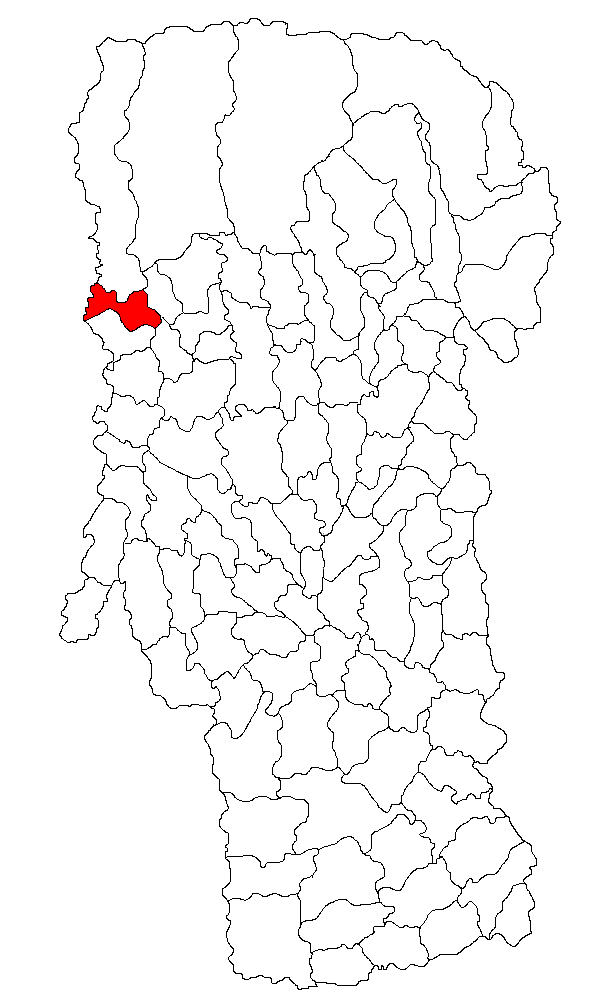
- Location in Argeș County

- Location in Romania
- Coordinates: 45°15′N 24°32′E
- Country: Romania
- County: Argeș

Government
  - Mayor (2020–2024): Constantin Iatagan (PSD)
- Area: 34.7 km^{2} (13.4 sq mi)
- Elevation: 520 m (1,710 ft)
- Population (2021-12-01): 2,025
  - Density: 58.4/km^{2} (151/sq mi)
- Time zone: UTC+02:00 (EET)
  - Summer (DST): UTC+03:00 (EEST)
- Postal code: 117725
- Area code: +(40) 248
- Vehicle reg.: AG
- Website: primariasuici.ro

Șuici is a commune in the northern Argeș County, Muntenia, Romania. It is composed of six villages: Ianculești, Paltenu, Păuleni, Rudeni, Șuici, and Valea Calului.

Șuici commune is situated approximately 22 km (14 mi) from Curtea de Argeș.

== Natives ==
- Andrei Boncea, film producer
