= Andi Vasluianu =

Romanian actor

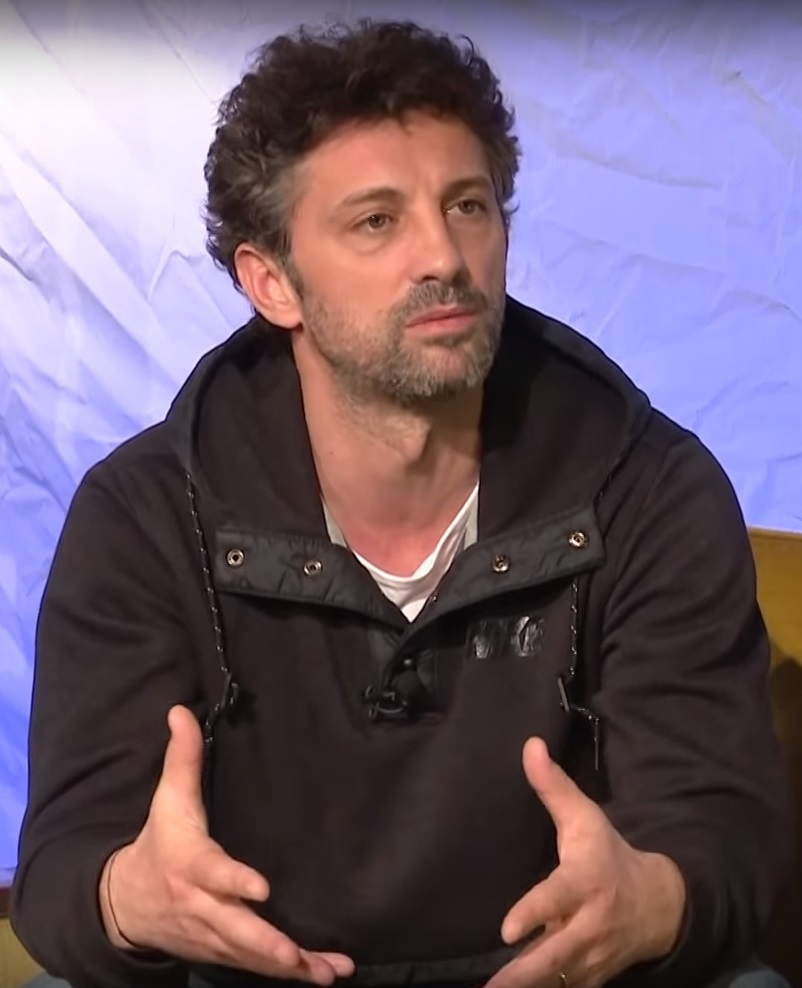
- Vasluianu in 2015
- Born: 23 June 1974 (age 51); Bucharest, Romania
- Occupation: Actor
- Years active: 2000-present

Andi Vasluianu (Romanian pronunciation: [ˈandi vasluˈjanu]; born 23 June 1974) is a Romanian film actor. He appeared in more than fifty films since 2000.

== Selected filmography ==
Film
Year	Title	Role	Notes
2012	Of Snails and Men		
2010	Bibliothèque Pascal		
2010	East Side Stories		
2008	Gruber's Journey		
2007	California Dreamin'		
2006	Marilena from P7		
2006	The Paper Will Be Blue		
2002	The Rage	Felie	

TV
Year	Title	Role	Notes
2005	Băieți buni		
