= Tudor Giurgiu =

Romanian film director (born 1972)

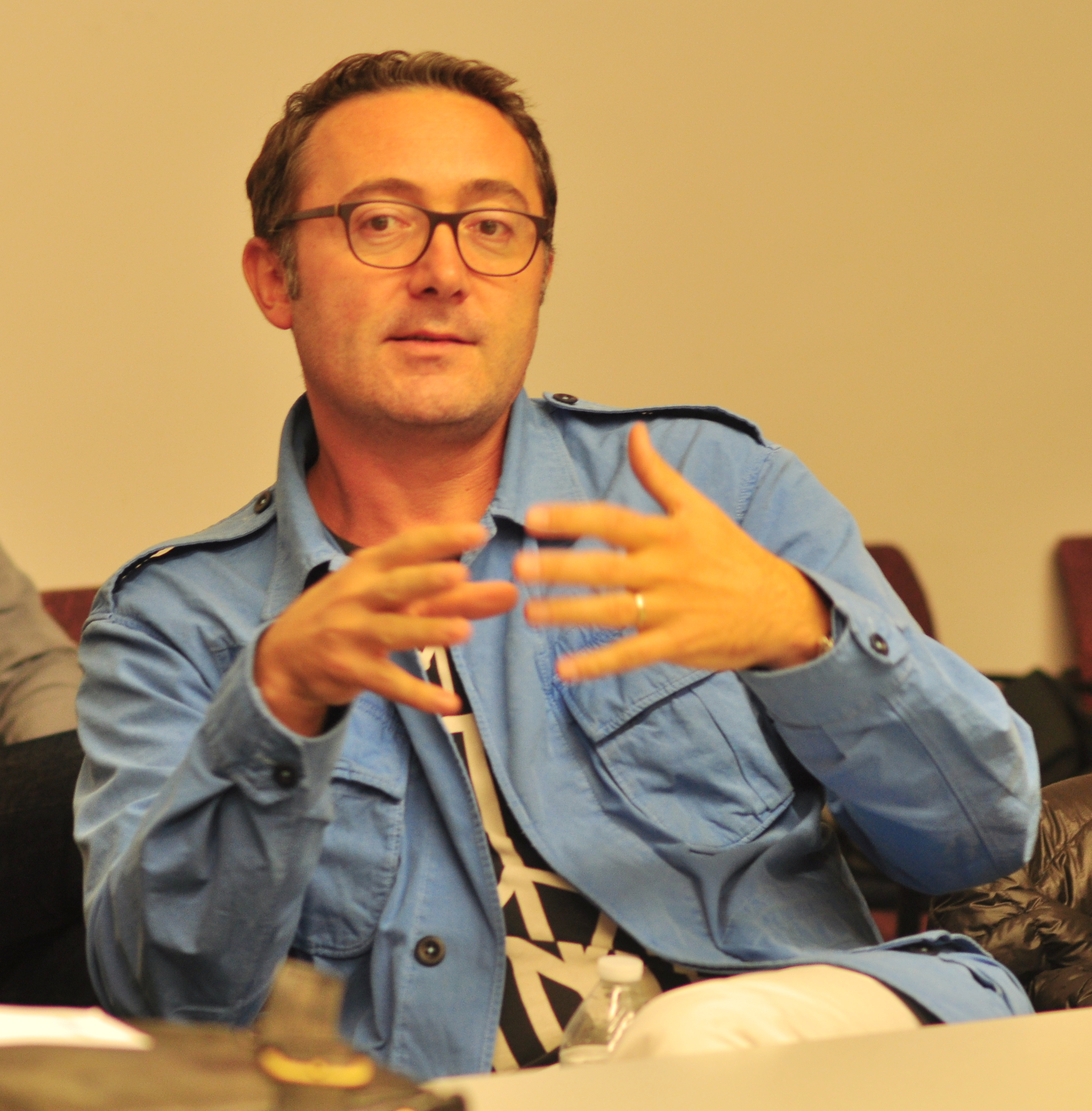
Tudor Giurgiu, 2016

Tudor Giurgiu (Romanian: [ˈtudor ˈdʒjurdʒju]; born 1972 in Cluj-Napoca, Romania) is a Romanian film director. Giurgiu graduated from Bucharest Film Academy in 1995. He was President of Romanian National Television (TVR) between 2005 and 2007. Tudor Giurgiu is also a director of music videos and has made documentaries. Giurgiu owns Librafilm, an independent production company and is the founder and president of Romanian Film Promotion, which puts on the Transilvania International Film Festival.

Love Sick, his first full-length film, was released in Romania in 2006.

== Personal life ==
Tudor has stated that the film that influenced him the most is Knife in the Water, directed by Roman Polanski.

== Filmography ==
- Vecini (1993)
- Popcorn Story (2001)
- Love Sick (2006)
- Ashes and Blood (2009) - producer
- Of Snails and Men (2012)
- Why Me? (2015)
- Parking (2019)
- Libertate (2023)
- Nasty (2024)
- 3 Days in September (2026)
