= Selfie 69 =

2016 Romanian romantic comedy film

- Directed by: Cristina Jacob
- Written by: Cristina Jacob; Tudor Potra; Maria Spirache
- Produced by: Adrian Sârbu; Daniel Iacob
- Starring: Crina Semciuc; Olimpia Melinte; Flavia Hojda; Vlad Logigan; Levent Sali; Alexandru Călin; Maia Morgenstern
- Cinematography: Barbu Bălășoiu
- Edited by: Gabriel Tudor Marin; Dragoș Teglaș; Dan Nanoveanu
- Music by: HaHaHa Production
- Production company: Zazu Film
- Distributed by: Zazu Film
- Release dates: 2 September 2016 (Montreal); 16 September 2016 (Romania)
- Running time: 116 minutes
- Country: Romania
- Language: Romanian
- Budget: €1.1 million
- Box office: 2.68 million lei (US$664,555)

Selfie 69 (stylised as #Selfie 69 or #selfie69) is a 2016 Romanian romantic comedy film directed by Cristina Jacob, a sequel to her 2014 debut Selfie. It follows Roxi, Yasmine and Ana, the three friends from the first film, now in their twenties, who after a night of partying bet on which of them will get married within three days, and the three young men whose lives the bet turns upside down. Crina Semciuc, Olimpia Melinte, Flavia Hojda, Vlad Logigan, Levent Sali and Alexandru Călin return in the lead roles. Maia Morgenstern plays the madam of a brothel in Chișinău. Dorina Chiriac, Marian Râlea, Răzvan Vasilescu and Alina Chivulescu are cast in the adult roles, and singers and television personalities such as Loredana Groza, Antonia and Codin Maticiuc appear in small parts. Zazu Film, the company Jacob founded in 2011, produced and distributed the film with support from Romania's National Film Centre (CNC). The announced budget was €1.1 million.

Released on 16 September 2016 after a summer-long campaign and a tour of previews with the cast, Selfie 69 sold 25,121 tickets on its opening weekend, the best start for a Romanian film since 1990. It became the most-watched Romanian film of the year, with 150,536 admissions according to Cinemagia, which followed it through twenty weeks in cinemas, or 133,744 in the cumulative lists the CNC published later. In October 2016 the producers announced it as the first Romanian film to gross more than two million lei. It won the Audience Award at the 2017 Gopo Awards and received one other nomination. Before its release the film was screened at the Montreal World Film Festival, and in 2019 it was added to Netflix.

== Plot ==
The story picks up the six characters from the first film a few years later. The three girls are now in their twenties. The film opens at a wedding. Just out of a painful break-up and after a hard night of partying, Roxi (Olimpia Melinte), Yasmine (Crina Semciuc) and Ana (Flavia Hojda) make a bet that quickly goes viral on Facebook. The bet is on which of them will manage to get married in the next three days. Each has a man in mind. Roxi keeps making up and falling out with Magi (Vlad Logigan), a perfume salesman who tells her he puts on magic shows in kindergartens and who, as the production notes put it, would do anything for her except mop the bathroom floor and change the cat litter. Ana is counting on Bogdan, known as Brain (Alexandru Călin), a methodical young man from a small provincial town who cares more about his studies and the rockets he builds than about what goes on around him. Mihai (Levent Sali), the hustler of the group, for whom easy money is the best money, falls for a prostitute, Iulia (Silvia Busuioc).

The three young men end up in a brothel run by a Moldovan mob madam, "the White Woman" (Maia Morgenstern), a woman with one blue eye who runs a human trafficking ring and keeps two heavies by her side. There the boys get what the film's publicity called a big helping of "Moldovan hard-core". The heavyweight mixed martial arts fighter Tolea Ciumac plays one of the Moldovans. One of the boys falls in love with a girl from the brothel and runs away with her. Meanwhile Yasmine, the rich girl of the first film, is humiliated and ends up naked in the middle of the city, and Ana, a spoilt daddy's girl, finds out that the wedding she took for granted will not come easily. Ana's father, Nea Ceaușu (Răzvan Vasilescu), tries to buy marijuana. A fortune teller (Dorina Chiriac), a blind man (Marian Râlea), a bank clerk (Maria Dinulescu) and Sergiu (Răzvan Fodor), the history teacher from the first film, all cross the friends' paths. Nudity, car chases, an art theft and a tango number follow. Whether any of the couples makes it to the altar stays open until the end.

== Cast ==
The cast, with the characters as listed by Cinemagia:

- Crina Semciuc as Yasmine
- Olimpia Melinte as Roxi
- Flavia Hojda as Ana
- Vlad Logigan as Magi
- Levent Sali as Mihai
- Alexandru Călin as Brain
- Răzvan Vasilescu as Nea Ceaușu, Ana's father
- Alina Chivulescu as Cecilia, Roxi's mother
- Maia Morgenstern as the madam
- Dorina Chiriac
- Marian Râlea as the blind man
- Răzvan Fodor as Sergiu
- Silvia Busuioc as Iulia
- Alex Bogdan as Elvis
- Tolea Ciumac as Gulie
- Maria Dinulescu as a bank clerk
- Raluca Aprodu as Laura
- Andrei Huțuleac as the boy from Yasmine's childhood
- Mihaela Mihuț as Lili
- Tudor Istodor as a weed dealer
- Alin State as a weed dealer
- Adela Popescu as the bride
- Loredana Groza as a bridesmaid
- Andrei Runcanu as the photographer
- Mihai Smarandache as Dragon Slayer
- Rudy Rosenfeld as an old man
- Conn Horgan as the German
- Emilian Oprea
- George Piștereanu
- Radu Vâlcan
- Codin Maticiuc
- Virgil Ianțu
- Lidia Buble
- Natalia Mateuț

Nine of the first film's actors return: the six leads, plus Vasilescu, Chivulescu and Fodor. The producers presented Morgenstern, Chiriac, Râlea, Alex Bogdan, Andrei Huțuleac and Tolea Ciumac as the film's "unusual characters", and a second group, made up of Groza, Antonia, Fodor, Lidia Buble, Adela Popescu, Radu Vâlcan, Virgil Ianțu, Speak and Codin Maticiuc, as special guests. Antonia said it was her first film. Groza plays a guest in the wedding scene that opens the film. The singer Peter Pop plays a stutterer.

== Production ==
=== Development and financing ===
Jacob spoke of a sequel as early as the premiere of the first film, in May 2014. The first film's result, the best of any Romanian release that year, led her to announce the sequel for 2015. She said later that audiences had asked for a second part and that their reactions had given her the strongest motivation for it. She wrote the screenplay with Maria Spirache, who had also worked on the first film, and with Tudor Potra, who graduated in film directing from UNATC and in film theory from the Sorbonne Nouvelle. The 2015 announcement of the shoot also named a fourth writer, Alex Jecu, who does not appear in the final credits.

Under the title Cum să te măriți în 3 zile (How to Get Married in 3 Days), the project entered the CNC's 2014 funding competition, the first held under the institution's new board. When the results were announced at the beginning of October, it came second among fiction features, with a credit of 1,190,000 lei, behind Călin Peter Netzer's Ana, mon amour (1,590,000 lei). By January 2015 Cineuropa was already writing about the project as #Selfie 69, with a budget of about €800,000, €270,000 of it from the CNC, some 30 shooting days planned for the spring and a Romanian release set for October 2015. The press release announcing the start of filming used the working title #Selfie 2: Cum să te măriți în 3 zile and put the budget at €900,000. The film was produced by Zazu Film, which also handled the distribution. Cinemagia and Cineuropa credit Daniel Iacob as producer, Cinefan and Box Office Mojo add the director, and the 2015 announcements named Cristina Dobrițoiu, the producer of the first film. Film New Europe's country report for 2016 describes the film as produced by Adrian Sârbu, the former chief executive of Central European Media Enterprises, through Zazu Film.

Jacob said in the summer of 2016 that she had been working on the film for two years. Her mother, the director recalled, rang her when she heard the new title to ask what kind of films she was making. A first teaser was already circulating under the title #Selfie69 at the end of 2015, when the producers announced the film for 2016 as more chaotic, more dynamic and livelier than the first.

=== Casting and rehearsals ===
The six young leads were kept, and Jacob added established names in the adult parts, above all Maia Morgenstern, in a role the producers described as provocative and atypical. Morgenstern said she had not understood the script at the first reading because the information, the images and the jokes came too fast, that the rehearsals had been essential, and that she built the part out of irony, dialogue and costume. Jacob again insisted on rehearsals, which she ran as workshops. Tolea Ciumac, a heavyweight fighter, was cast as one of the Moldovans. Speaking on set, Logigan said that Morgenstern, whom you might expect to behave like a statue, had played around like a child the whole time. Levent Sali said he had based Mihai on himself.

=== Filming ===
Filming began on Monday, 30 March 2015, and was scheduled to last until 7 May, in 41 locations in Bucharest and Ilfov County, with Barbu Bălășoiu, the cinematographer of Sieranevada, behind the camera. Later press releases spoke of 33 shooting days in more than 43 locations in and around Bucharest, and at the trailer launch in May 2016 Jacob herself counted eight lead actors, 64 locations and 69 extras, a coincidence she pointed out to the audience. At a preview in Ploiești she said the film had 68 actors with speaking parts, not counting extras, a great many locations, stunts and dance sequences, and that it had been a bigger challenge than the first film. Sali recalled shooting a sex scene with Silvia Busuioc while wearing a skin-coloured patch, which stuck so well that he yelled when he peeled it off. The tango sequence took two months of work.

The film was edited by Gabriel Tudor Marin, Dragoș Teglaș and Dan Nanoveanu, and the costumes were designed by Adina Bucur, who had also worked on the first film. Colour grading was done at Digital Cube in Bucharest by Claudiu Doagă and was finished in August 2016. The film is in the 1.85:1 format and runs 116 minutes, though Cinefan gives 118.

=== Music ===
The music was written specially for the film by HaHaHa Production, the production house of Smiley, which had also made the songs for Selfie and for Jacob's second feature, Love Is a Story. Its producers said at the trailer launch that more than 30 instrumentalists had worked over 320 hours on 46 scenes, and that the music followed the mood of each scene instead of being written for particular performers. Șerban Cazan, a producer and composer at HaHaHa, said after seeing the film that it was much better than the first one. The singer Jazzy Jo created a large part of the music together with Smiley and sings some of the songs. The piece for the tango sequence went through more than two hundred versions, Jacob said.

== Release ==
=== Promotion ===
The release date was pushed back several times. The film was announced for spring 2016, then for April, for May and for the summer, and finally, on 25 July 2016, for 16 September, with the tagline "Indecent de romantic și feelingos de sexy" (roughly "indecently romantic and soulfully sexy"). The official trailer was launched on Saturday, 28 May 2016, at 7 pm at Romexpo, during East European Comic Con, in a full hall, with Jacob and several of the actors present. The invitation promised that the actors would answer questions about what the "69" in the title meant.

The campaign made the most of two run-ins with Facebook. At the end of June the platform refused to run the poster, on which Olimpia Melinte's navel merges into Crina Semciuc's lips holding a wedding ring, under the tagline "It's a fucking lovestory", citing its rules on vulgar language. Jacob said the ban was the last thing she had expected and that Facebook had no sense of humour. Two weeks later the site refused to promote the first page of "Dirty Yasmine", a diary of Semciuc's character published on insideyasmine.ro. At the end of August the producers released eleven character posters, made in a few weeks by the agency Safe Frame, each with a hidden message and with "69" as the common element. Cinemagia described them as the first promotion of this kind for a Romanian feature film. A series of Mediafax interviews with the actors ran around the release under the heading "Selfiemania cucerește România" ("Selfiemania conquers Romania").

=== Previews and premiere ===
Between 5 and 11 September 2016 the actors and the director took the film around the country in a series of previews. They were in Constanța (Cinema City, City Park) on 5 September, in Brăila and Galați on the 6th, in Iași (Cinema City, Iulius Mall) on the 7th, in Bucharest (Cinema City, AFI Cotroceni) on the 8th, in Ploiești on the 9th, in Bucharest again (Grand Cinema & More, Băneasa) on the 10th and in Brașov (Cinema One, Coresi) on the 11th. Melinte, Logigan, Sali, Hojda and Călin went on the tour with Jacob. Sali, who is from Constanța, had his friends, his mother and his grandmother in the audience there. The Bucharest preview on 8 September was attended by Smiley, Andreea Marin, Oana Sârbu and other guests. In Brașov the hall was full, mostly with young people.

The gala premiere was held on the evening of Thursday, 15 September 2016, at CinemaPro in Bucharest, before a few hundred spectators and guests who included Teo Trandafir, Alex Velea, Dan Chișu, Pavel Bartoș, Doina Levintza and Irina Margareta Nistor. Chișu, who had seen the film before it was finished, singled out the scene with the fortune teller played by Dorina Chiriac.

=== Theatrical run ===
The film opened on Friday, 16 September 2016, distributed by Zazu Film on 58 screens, in a network that ran from the multiplexes of Bucharest and Cluj-Napoca to cinemas in small towns such as Bârlad, Caransebeș, Oravița and Vulcan. It was rated N-15, not recommended for children under 15. The tour went on after the release. On 21 September the actors met audiences in Arad (Cinema City, Atrium Mall) and in Timișoara, where about 200 people came, and on 22 September in Cluj-Napoca, where more than 200 viewers applauded for minutes on end. Logigan said that wherever they went people asked them for a third part, and Melinte that Romanians in Spain, Italy and Israel were asking for screenings. A year later, on 9 September 2017, the film was shown in the open air at ZazuComediFest in Brașov, a three-day event built around the two Selfie films and Two Lottery Tickets.

=== Festivals ===
Selfie 69 was selected for the 2016 Montreal World Film Festival (Festival des films du monde, 25 August to 5 September), where it had three screenings in the Focus on World Cinema section, on 2, 3 and 4 September. Jacob said it was an honour to represent Romania at one of the most important festivals in the world, but the team stayed at home for the launch campaign. In 2018 the film was chosen to open the Manila leg of Cine Europa 21, the European Union's film festival in the Philippines, at the inauguration of the Red Carpet cinemas in Shangri-La Plaza in December, in the presence of the EU ambassador, Franz Jessen. It had also been shown at the Cinematheque Centre Manila on 24 November.

=== Television and streaming ===
According to the director's website, the television rights were bought by Pro TV. Netflix added the film on 1 June 2019, in 190 territories according to the same website. It stayed on the platform until May 2025, and from April 2024 it was also available in Romania on SkyShowtime.

== Reception ==
=== Box office ===
On its opening weekend the film sold 25,121 tickets and took 422,592 lei, placing second behind Nerve (27,282). It was the best opening for a Romanian film in 26 years, ahead of Aferim!, which had set the previous record of 20,039 in 2015, and of Child's Pose (19,729 in 2013), and roughly double the 12,648 tickets sold by Selfie. Cineuropa noted that the best Romanian opening of the year until then had belonged to Sieranevada, with 11,600, and that Selfie 69 was aimed at young audiences, who rarely go to see Romanian films. In its second week the film was third over the weekend, behind Storks and The Magnificent Seven, but first over the whole week, with 63,016 admissions after ten days, which the producers called the best first week for a Romanian film in fifteen years.

By 2 October, after three weekends, it had reached 86,770 admissions and takings of nearly 1.5 million lei (€330,000), which the producers presented as the highest for a Romanian film in 26 years, above what The Matrix Reloaded, Gladiator or The Da Vinci Code had made in Romania in their day. It passed 100,000 admissions on its fourth weekend (105,593, with 1.8 million lei, by 9 October), a mark Selfie had needed six weeks to reach, and by 16 October it stood at 118,869 admissions and 2,051,236 lei, which the producers announced as the first time a Romanian film had gone past two million lei. The opening record lasted three weeks. Two Lottery Tickets, released on 7 October, opened with 27,182 admissions. At the end of November the producers spoke of more than 143,000 admissions, the most for a Romanian film in fourteen years, and at the end of the year the Cinemagia chart, to which distributors report, showed 150,113 admissions and 2,674,319 lei, against 133,723 admissions and 2,437,612 lei for Two Lottery Tickets. The film left the chart in January 2017 with 150,536 admissions and 2,678,435 lei (US$664,555) after twenty weeks. Box Office Mojo records US$664,351 and 28th place among all the films released in Romania in 2016.

In its preliminary review of 2016, Cineuropa named it the highest-grossing Romanian film of the year, a year in which the two comedies were the first Romanian films in a very long time to take more than €500,000 each and to make the annual top 40. Film New Europe's country report ranked it first among Romanian films by admissions and 30th overall. The opening weekend record was broken again in 2018 by Octav (27,221) and by Moromeții 2, and in February 2019 Jacob beat her own record by a wide margin with Oh, Ramona!, which sold 111,881 tickets on its opening weekend. Cinemagia observed on that occasion that none of Selfie 69, Two Lottery Tickets or Moromeții 2 had been number one on the weekly chart on its opening weekend, as Oh, Ramona! was.

=== Critical response ===
Presenting the week's new releases for Cinemagia, Ștefan Dobroiu wrote that whatever reservations the critics might have, the film was one the Romanian public needed, capable of overcoming its reluctance towards local productions, and he predicted a result on a par with the first film. Ștefan R. Apostol of MovieNews gave it 90 percent and praised a fresh film that keeps moving and has no dead scenes, with good humour, a more human Olimpia Melinte and a technical level, in picture, sound and editing, up to the standards of 2016. The writer Eugen Istodor, in Gândul and Mediafax, read the film as five love stories and argued that beyond the shares, likes and dating it is about the need for love and to be accepted. He praised the verbal and situational humour and the characters, the "magic man" and the father above all. The journalist Liviu Mihaiu welcomed it as a Romanian film "like in the movies", not "like in life", a break with the poverty and communism of the country's festival cinema, with dialogue in which audiences recognise the way they talk, and called it the best Romanian comedy since Liceenii. Romania Insider drew its own conclusion from the box office, noting that films praised at festivals, such as Sieranevada and Dogs, had brought in far fewer viewers than the comedies.

=== Accolades ===
Selfie 69 was one of 21 feature films eligible for the 2017 Gopo Awards. It received a single nomination in the competitive categories, for best makeup and hairstyling (Nicoleta Toader and Andreea Dardea), a category won by Scarred Hearts. At the eleventh ceremony, held on 21 March 2017 in the main hall of the National Theatre Bucharest before more than 900 guests, the Audience Award for the Romanian film with the biggest box office success of 2016 went to both Selfie 69 and Two Lottery Tickets, the only two films of the year to have passed 100,000 admissions and two million lei. Cineuropa's report credits the former with the most admissions and the latter with the highest takings.

Award	Date of ceremony	Category	Recipient(s)	Result	Ref.
Gopo Awards	21 March 2017	Audience Award	Selfie 69 (shared with Two Lottery Tickets)	Won	
Gopo Awards	21 March 2017	Best Makeup and Hairstyling	Nicoleta Toader, Andreea Dardea	Nominated	

== Aftermath ==
Jacob's next film grew directly out of the success of Selfie 69. In November 2016, while the film was still in cinemas, Zazu Film opened casting in Iași, Bucharest and Cluj for an adaptation of Andrei Ciobanu's novel Suge-o, Ramona!, with filming planned for the summer of 2017. The film reached cinemas in February 2019 as Oh, Ramona!. In March 2017 Jacob and Potra ran a screenwriting workshop in Bucharest, "De la idee, la scenariu" ("From idea to screenplay"), which the press presented as a course given by the authors of the Selfie 69 success.
