= Daniel Iacob =

Romanian film producer

- Born: 1991 (age 34–35); Bern, Switzerland
- Citizenship: Romanian
- Education: University of Portsmouth; University College London
- Occupation: Film producer
- Years active: 2012–present
- Organization: Zazu Film
- Known for: Selfie 69, Oh, Ramona!, The Perfect Escape

Daniel Iacob (born 1991) is a Romanian film producer. He is a shareholder in the Bucharest production company Zazu Film, which he ran from 2015 to 2023. He produced the comedies Selfie 69 (2016), Oh, Ramona! (2019) and The Perfect Escape (2023), all directed by Cristina Jacob. The first two won the Gopo Audience Award, given to the Romanian productions with the biggest box-office success of the previous year, and in 2019 Oh, Ramona! became the first Romanian film to be released worldwide by Netflix.

== Early life and education ==
Iacob was born in Bern, Switzerland, in 1991, and his family moved back to Romania when he was eight months old. He grew up in Galați and moved to Bucharest at sixteen, where he graduated from high school as valedictorian. He studied international relations and politics at the University of Portsmouth, graduating in 2013. The same year he was admitted to University College London, where he completed a master's degree in global governance and ethics in 2014.

In February 2014, while he was still a master's student, the newspaper Gândul featured him among six Romanian students in the United Kingdom in its "Let's Change the Story" campaign. The campaign had started as a response to articles in the Daily Mail about Romanian immigrants. Iacob said at the time that the British tabloids had tarnished the image of Romanians everywhere. In September 2015 he wrote an opinion piece for the same paper about corruption among Romanian politicians.

== Zazu Film ==
Iacob became chief executive of Zazu Film in March 2015 and held the post until March 2023. Since then he has been one of the company's producers. Zazu Film makes comedies and romantic comedies for young audiences. In November 2015 the company released Cristina Jacob's Love Is a Story, a co-production with MediaPro Entertainment, in Romanian cinemas.

In September 2017 Iacob presented Zazu ComediFest, a showcase of Romanian comedy films, to the press in Brașov. The local paper Bună Ziua Brașov described it as the first event of its kind and called it a pilot edition. For three evenings, from 8 to 10 September, Piațeta Sfântul Ioan was to become a free open-air cinema with more than 400 seats, showing #Selfie, Selfie 69 and Two Lottery Tickets, one a night. City officials announced a festival of comedies from around the world for the following year.

=== Selfie 69 ===
The first feature Iacob worked on as a producer was Selfie 69, the sequel to the comedy #Selfie. Directed by Cristina Jacob, who also wrote the screenplay with Maria Spirache and Tudor Potra, the film was produced and distributed by Zazu Film and opened in cinemas on 16 September 2016. In the credits published by Cotidianul before the release, Adrian Sârbu is listed as producer and Iacob as executive producer.

The film drew more than 25,000 viewers on its opening weekend. After three weeks it had passed 100,000 tickets and, according to Mediafax, had become the first Romanian film to gross over 1.5 million lei. In early October 2016 the same agency reported that it was the highest-grossing Romanian production of the previous 26 years. Over its whole run it drew 150,536 viewers and took 2.68 million lei, according to Cinemagia.

In an opinion piece for Mediafax, Liviu Mihaiu praised its urban characters, who talk naturally, far from neorealist clichés. Irina Margareta Nistor was more reserved. According to Cotidianul, she saw it as a film for young clubgoers, who would recognise themselves in it.

For its 2016 results, which the organisers put at 133,207 admissions and 2,296,771 lei, the film won the Audience Award at the Gopo ceremony on 21 March 2017. It shared the award with Two Lottery Tickets, which in the same figures had higher takings but fewer admissions.

=== Oh, Ramona! ===
Oh, Ramona!, an adaptation of the autobiographical novel by the comedian Andrei Ciobanu, was Cristina Jacob's first film in English. Iacob was executive producer and Adrian Sârbu producer. Its budget, large for a Romanian film, was over €2.5 million, part of it covered by the National Centre of Cinematography.

Produced by Zazu Film and distributed by Jacob Bros, the film was released on Valentine's Day, 14 February 2019. It drew 111,881 viewers on its opening weekend, the best start for a Romanian production in 30 years, and by its third week it was the first Romanian production to gross more than a million dollars. It ended its cinema run with 256,115 admissions and 5,016,367 lei, the most watched Romanian film of the year. The result brought it the Audience Award, shared with 5Gang: Another Kind of Christmas, at the Gopo ceremony of 29 June 2020. The gala was held outdoors at Verde Stop Arena, three months late because of the pandemic. In a doctoral thesis written at the I. L. Caragiale National University of Theatre and Film, Iulia Stoianovici gives it as an example of a film that found its audience through a story that was already popular, in this case Ciobanu's novel.

On 1 June 2019 the film appeared on Netflix in 190 countries, translated into 33 languages. It was the first Romanian film that the platform distributed worldwide. By the autumn of that year, four of Cristina Jacob's films were on Netflix, the director said in an interview with Luxury magazine.

Gloria Sauciuc wrote on Cinemagia that the film leaves viewers in a good mood, though she found its AP-12 rating permissive for its erotic content. After the Netflix release, American critics were much harsher. Asher Luberto gave it an F in The Playlist, and Roger Moore of Movie Nation found it sexist, crude and backward.

=== The Perfect Escape ===
His third feature, The Perfect Escape, was shot under the working title Stormy Nights. Filming, delayed by the pandemic, began on 31 March 2021 at the studios in Buftea and continued in Transylvania, with an international cast. Iacob produced the film through Zazu Film, and the National Centre of Cinematography supported it with about €250,000. In an interview with HotNews, the director said the film had cost $4 million and that its producer was Iacob, together with the partners who financed it.

The comedy, also in English, opened in cinemas on 17 February 2023, distributed by Jacob Bros. According to Box Office Mojo, it took $81,969 on its opening weekend and $183,762 in total. On Cinemagia, Gloria Sauciuc recognised the romantic-comedy formula but liked the good mood the film leaves behind. The film has been available on SkyShowtime since 4 April 2024.

== Aspire Romania ==
Iacob has been involved with Aspire Romania, a non-governmental organisation founded in 2011 by graduates of leading universities in the United States and Europe. It aims to find and train future leaders and entrepreneurs through summer programmes taught by professors from Harvard, Stanford and Georgetown. By 2024 its community had over 1,000 members of 51 nationalities.

In early 2020 he hosted the second of the Aspire Dinners at his office in Bucharest. The dinners are small gatherings where members of the community talk with leaders and business people. In the summer of 2022 he taught an optional course, Film Making 101, at the Aspire summer school, and that November he was one of the guest speakers at the alumni programme held in Snagov.

== Filmography ==
Year	Title	Director	Role	Notes
2012	În film la Nașu'	Cristina Iacob	production crew	Short film
2014	#Selfie	Cristina Iacob	production assistant	
2016	Selfie 69	Cristina Iacob	executive producer	Gopo Audience Award, 2017
2019	Oh, Ramona!	Cristina Jacob	executive producer	Gopo Audience Award, 2020; released on Netflix in 2019
2023	The Perfect Escape	Cristina Jacob	producer	On SkyShowtime since 2024

== Awards ==
Year	Award	Category	Film	Result
2017	Gopo Awards	Audience Award	Selfie 69	Won
2020	Gopo Awards	Audience Award	Oh, Ramona!	Won
