= Kingdom of Judas =

Romanian drama film

- Directed by: Sabina Lisievici
- Written by: Sabina Lisievici
- Produced by: Sabina Lisievici, Viorel Chesaru
- Starring: Sabina Lisievici, Oana Carmaciu, Bogdan Iacob, Oana Dragne, Adi Gheo, Raluca Ghervan, Daria Ghitu
- Cinematography: Alexandru Lisievici, Paul Soare, Andrei Radulescu
- Edited by: Maria Lazar
- Music by: Unknown Chapters, UNA, Yamin Bene, Redd Daniel, Sophia Secret
- Production companies: Saroafilm, Chainsaw Europe
- Distributed by: Saroafilm
- Release date: 12 April 2024 (Romania)
- Running time: 95 minutes
- Country: Romania
- Language: English

Kingdom of Judas is a Romanian English-language thriller film directed by Sabina Lisievici in her debut direction and starring Sabina Lisievici, Oana Carmaciu, Bogdan Iacob, George Damare, Adi Gheo, Oana Dragne, Daria Ghitu, Raluca Ghervan and the Romanian fighter Sandu Lungu (cameo), among others. The film tells the story of Anna, who has to confront with the death of her sister as she identifies five potential suspects related to her sister’s demise.

It was produced by Saroafilm after the short film On Hold, also directed by Sabina Lisievici. The film is the first one in the history of Romanian cinema to have been produced entirely in English but with only Romanian actors.

The film had a special screening in The American Film Market on November 2, 2023 in Los Angeles.

== Plot ==
After her sister's tragic suicide, Anna is determined to uncover the truth about what led to her sibling's death. In her pursuit of answers, she creates an intricate plan involving her sister's five artist contacts, placing them in a celebrity rehabilitation center. As she pushes them to confront their past actions and take responsibility for their mistakes, Anna starts to uncover hidden truths related to her sister's passing.

== Cast ==
- Sabina Lisievici as Anna Blaga
- Oana Carmaciu as Maria Blaga
- Bogdan Iacob as Dean Hart
- Adi Gheo as Kayne
- Daria Ghitu as Marga
- Oana Dragne as May
- Raluca Ghervan as Fedora
- George Damare as George
- Catalin Nicolau as Marco
- Mihai Dulea as Mick
- Adrian Ciglenean as Petru (Anna’s father)
- Marcela Motoc as Kiki (the manager)
- Oltin Hurezeanu as Carl Kraft (the mentor)
- Teodora Daiana Pacurar as Yoga Guru
- Clabuc Vinicius Moldovan as Jack (the fan)
- Sandu Lungu cameo
- Sophie Varzaru as Young Anna
- Sofia Vasiliu as Young Maria

== Production ==
The film was shot in the cities of Bucharest and Alba Iulia between August 2021 and October 2022.

== Release ==
The film had a national release in Romanian theaters in April 2024.

== Reception ==
"Kingdom of Judas is a film that achieved what it was meant to, to enter history as the first Romanian film with only Romanian actors, spoken entirely in English. It is also very different from any other Romanian film we have seen. Romanian films in English are also Oh, Ramona and The Perfect Escape, but those films didn't have only Romanian actors in the cast. Unfortunately, numerous problems inherent to the script, the direction and the technical aspects do not allow the film to become truly relevant in the Romanian history of film, of which, spoken in English or not, it is still a part. Maybe sometimes it's better to learn the rules before breaking them.", commented a very mixed review at CineMagia (Romania).

Palindrom found that, "perhaps also to mark a specific and radical difference from the long line of "miserabilist" films that stubbornly show an ugly Romania. Having personally gone through the Hollywood school, Sabina Lisievici knows that the beauty of images, the pure aesthetics, has its part in the success of any film, regardless of its theme."
