= Aleph News =

Romanian television news channel

- Country: Romania
- Broadcast area: Romania
- Headquarters: 58–60 Gheorghe Polizu Street, Sector 1, Bucharest

Programming
- Language: Romanian
- Picture format: 1080i HDTV / 576i SDTV (16:9); 9:16 (online)

Ownership
- Owner: Adrian Sârbu, through Aleph Media
- Sister channels: Aleph Business; Smart TV

History
- Launched: 1 September 2020; 6 years ago

Links
- Website: alephnews.ro

Aleph News is a Romanian television news channel that began broadcasting on 1 September 2020. Its owner is Adrian Sârbu, the founder of Pro TV and former chief executive of Central European Media Enterprises. He holds it through his company Aleph Media, and the channel is based in Bucharest. Sârbu launched it as "social television", and its programmes are produced in a vertical 9:16 format for mobile phones alongside the standard 16:9.

The project was announced in 2019, when the National Audiovisual Council (CNA) granted Aleph Media licences for Aleph News, Aleph Business and Aleph Comedy. The council authorised Aleph News to start broadcasting on 5 August 2020. Since 2021 the channel has been in a dispute with the cable operator RCS & RDS (Digi) over its place in the Digi channel list. The CNA fined the operator in December 2021 and again in February 2022, and the Competition Council opened an investigation into a possible abuse of a dominant position, which was still open in November 2025.

== History ==
=== Licensing and launch ===
On 25 June 2019 the CNA granted Aleph Media licences for three channels, Aleph News, Aleph Business and Aleph Comedy, in a vote that HotNews described as narrow. According to the documentation filed with the regulator, Aleph News was aimed mainly at viewers between 18 and 54, mostly urban, with higher education and incomes above the average. Aleph Media announced a total investment of €14 million in the three channels. About €1.7 million of it was meant for Aleph News, €5.4 million for Aleph Business and €6.9 million for Aleph Comedy. Sârbu, who had set up CME's Romanian stations in the 1990s and later ran the group, spoke at the time of a channel built mainly on news, foreign news included, and of a wider project with thematic channels and video services to follow.

The channel was supposed to launch in the first half of 2020. The pandemic pushed the date back, and in May Sârbu was still promising a start in June. The CNA's broadcasting authorisation came on 5 August, Forbes România reported on 29 August that the first broadcast was set for the 31st, and the channel went on air on Tuesday, 1 September 2020.

Sârbu gave an interview on the channel that evening, to Marius Tucă, one of the few he has given according to Pagina de Media. Financing had been the hardest part of the project, he said, and one of the financiers was Ronald Lauder, his partner at CME, with whom he had launched Pro TV in 1995.

=== Editorial and visual concept ===
The term used at the launch was "social television". By it Sârbu meant a news service built for the internet and the mobile phone as much as for the television set. Revista Biz summed it up as a news channel designed for the phone, for an educated public with above-average incomes.

The trade press picked out several things that were unusual for Romanian news channels at the time. Lower thirds were used sparingly, there was no permanent news ticker, the presenters spoke to the viewer directly and in close-up, and the graphics were mostly white, black and red. Petrișor Obae of Pagina de Media, who watched the broadcast on the first morning, considered the station's most important innovation to be that the phone picture was not the same as the television one. On the phone the frame turned vertical, and a split screen that showed two images side by side on television showed them one above the other. The tight framing served a purpose, since the same pictures had to work on a television set and on a phone held upright. Six months after the launch, Libertatea took stock of the station. The paper described the fixed shots, the presenters dressed all in white and the different picture online, and noted that Aleph News was unlike the rest of Romanian television.

How this is done on the technical side was described in April 2021 by SVG Europe and, in the United States, by Sports Video Group. The on-air graphics are generated twice at once, in 16:9 for the television signal over SDI and in 9:16 for mobile over NDI, on equipment from the British company RT Software that is integrated with an Etere newsroom system. Mihai Burceag, the chief technology officer of Aleph Media, was quoted as saying that the company had used RT Software's systems since 2020.

=== Reactions to the launch ===
Several people from the press and television commented on the launch in posts published online, which Pagina de Media then picked up. Dragoș Stanca, the founder of the Upgrade 100 festival, liked the simultaneous broadcast in a vertical format for the phone and a horizontal one for television. He also liked the more natural tone and the lack of sensationalism, but said the product could only be judged after six months.

Orlando Nicoară, the founder of News.ro and Profit.ro, welcomed the investment, the first of its kind in the Romanian press in several years, and saw the visual style as something new for the market. The editorial side disappointed him, especially at a station that presented itself as a platform for breaking news.

Most of the criticism was aimed at the execution. Septimiu Sărățeanu, a former news producer at Pro TV, thought the broadcast had started below the level of the concept. In his view the idea of "social television" was not new, and the big networks had long been adapting their content to each kind of screen. Dan Negru, a presenter at Antena 1, found the packaging cheap and said he had expected the channel to open with an exclusive. A review published by Monitor Media the day after the launch found the format original but did not see it as a recipe for success.

The launch was also covered in English. Romania Insider, a Bucharest-based publication, called Sârbu a "media mogul" and wrote that Aleph News was starting out on the networks of several operators, though not on that of Digi, the country's largest cable operator. The article also relayed Sârbu's view that the channel was meant for people who get their news on the phone and have given up on traditional television. Film New Europe, a news portal on the film industry in Central and Eastern Europe, reminded its readers that Sârbu had run CME, the group that owned Pro TV, and noted that on phones the channel was formatted in vertical 9:16, as on Instagram. The stated target was an audience of 1.3 million people. In January 2021 the same portal included the launch in its analysis of the Romanian television market in 2020, where Aleph News appeared as the first of several channels planned by the Aleph group.

== Team and formats ==
The journalists and producers who started the channel came from several Romanian television stations and editorial projects. Marius Tucă brought over his talk show, Marius Tucă Show, one of the main programmes in the first schedule, and Ion Cristoiu presented Gândurile lui Cristoiu. Vlad Craioveanu presented Ochii pe mine. Dan Pavel, Oana Despa and Liviu Mihaiu, one of the founders of Radio Guerrilla, were also part of the initial team.

Ioana Țigănilă and Andrei Tomescu had come from Digi24. Costi Mocanu and Felix Drăghici, who had left Pro TV a year earlier, presented Știu, then on air on weekdays at 19:00. Pagina de Media watched the first edition and described it as a news bulletin and a talk show in one. Each presenter brought his own stories, which the two then debated head to head, and a panel of journalists from the channel and from other newsrooms in the group gave them marks.

A later addition to the schedule, and one of its regular programmes since, was Știu pe ce lume trăiesc, a debate on political, institutional and social subjects with Sârbu himself, Bogdan Hofbauer ("Hofi") and Lucian Nemoiu ("Nemo").

== Programmes ==
The schedule has included news bulletins and programmes on politics, the economy, culture and other subjects. The list below gives some of the channel's programmes. The first four were still on air in September 2026, and the rest are listed in the order in which they left the schedule.

- Știu pe ce lume trăiesc, a weekly debate on politics and public administration with Adrian Sârbu, broadcast on Wednesdays at 22:00.
- Știu, a programme of news and commentary that has been on air since the launch. Costi Mocanu and Felix Drăghici presented it until 2021, the year both left the channel. Drăghici went to Antena 1 in the spring and Mocanu let his contract expire that summer. In September 2026 it went out on weekdays at 20:00, with a guest in each edition and presenters who changed from one edition to the next, among them Mihaela Măncilă, Tamara Ceaicovschi and Alex Anghel.
- InSecuritate, a weekly programme on national security, hosted since 2021 by Tamara Ceaicovschi and Silviu Predoiu, a former head of the Foreign Intelligence Service.
- Cine te apără?, a programme on defence hosted by Andreea Soare. Her guest in September 2026 was John Bolton, a former national security adviser to US president Donald Trump.
- În căutarea revoluției pierdute, a documentary series about the 1989 revolution, launched in December 2020. It brings together the accounts of Ion Iliescu, Petre Roman, Ana Blandiana and others who took part in the events.
- Ochii pe mine, an evening talk show presented by Vlad Craioveanu from the launch until April 2021.
- Marius Tucă Show, hosted by Marius Tucă until February 2022. Tucă, who was also Sârbu's business partner in the radio station Smart FM and in Smart TV, parted company with Aleph that month, after his programme had run for a month in repeats only.
- Știu, deci știi, on lesser-known episodes of history, presented from 2021 to 2022 by Răzvan Theodorescu, a member of the Romanian Academy.
- Gândurile lui Cristoiu, a weekly programme in which Ion Cristoiu commented on the events of the week, moderated by Magda Gheorghiță. It ran from the launch until June 2025.
- Off/On the Record, a political talk show hosted by Sorina Matei from 2021 until October 2025, when she moved to Gândul-Mediafax. Its guests included the justice minister Cătălin Predoiu, the chief prosecutor of the National Anticorruption Directorate (DNA), Marius Voineag, and the former prime minister Adrian Năstase.

=== Interviews that made headlines ===
Some interviews broadcast by Aleph News were taken up by other media and drew public reactions.

In December 2020, a few days after the parliamentary election, the co-presidents of the Alliance for the Union of Romanians (AUR), George Simion and Claudiu Târziu, were guests on Marius Tucă Show. Tucă asked them about Călin Georgescu, the party's choice for prime minister, who in a video message had called Corneliu Zelea Codreanu and Ion Antonescu heroes. HotNews published part of the exchange the next day and noted that the two leaders had not distanced themselves from Georgescu's statements.

In January 2021 Rareș Bogdan, the first vice-president of the National Liberal Party (PNL), said on Aleph News that Ludovic Orban had failed as party president and should no longer lead the PNL. HotNews reported his remarks the same evening. Three days later, on Digi FM, Bogdan said the interview had caused a great stir and that he regretted an expression he had used about Orban.

In February 2021 the former prime minister Victor Ponta told Ion Cristoiu on Aleph News how he had helped Serbia during the floods of 2014. By his account, opening the dam at the Iron Gates flooded villages in Romania but spared Belgrade. In April 2025, in the campaign for the presidential election, Ponta told the story again, and several political leaders called on him to pull out of the race. HotNews then traced the story back to the 2021 interview.

In an interview on Aleph News at the end of June 2022, the former constitutional judge Daniel Morar argued that between 2018 and 2022 there had been a legislative gap on the interruption of the statute of limitations, which for defendants worked like a more favourable criminal law. Morar had been the rapporteur judge for the Constitutional Court's decision on the question in May 2022. G4Media set the interview against the position of the former justice minister Tudorel Toader, who disputed that reading. The site cited the interview again in September, in its report on the arguments the Prosecutor General's Office put to the High Court of Cassation and Justice, which was due to rule on the question on 25 October.

In August 2023 the prime minister, Marcel Ciolacu, said on Ion Cristoiu's programme that without fiscal measures the budget deficit would reach 6.2% of GDP. He also threatened to resign if the PNL did not back the package of measures. G4Media, Digi24 and the Romanian service of Radio Free Europe picked up his statements, and there were reactions from the PNL, the Social Democratic Party (PSD) and the Save Romania Union (USR). The next day the PNL president, Nicolae Ciucă, replied that there had been no question of Ciolacu negotiating with his mandate on the table.

The DNA's chief prosecutor, Marius Voineag, spoke on Off/On the Record in February 2024 about the replacement of the head of the DNA's Constanța office, a decision that several prosecutors from that office had taken to the Superior Council of Magistracy. Ziua de Constanța published a transcript of the conversation. In August 2025 the national press picked up Voineag's remarks on the same programme about the case of Florian Coldea, a former first deputy director of the Romanian Intelligence Service (SRI), and Coldea replied in a press release. G4Media cited the interview again in August 2026, when Coldea's trial began.

In February 2025 Crin Antonescu, the governing coalition's candidate in the presidential election, was a guest on Off/On the Record. He said that the criteria by which the Constitutional Court validated candidacies risked turning it into o instanță de tip iranian, "an Iranian-type court". He also said that Diana Șoșoacă and Călin Georgescu should be allowed to run, so that the disputes in society would be settled at the ballot box. Digi24 and G4Media reported his remarks the next day.

== Distribution ==
On its first day Aleph News was available on Vodafone, Telekom, Orange, iNES and NextGen and online, on its own site and on Facebook, Instagram and YouTube. Digi, the largest cable network in the country, did not carry it at first. It entered the RCS & RDS line-up on 4 September 2020, and by 9 September it could be watched in HD on RCS & RDS, Telekom and Orange. The position the operator later gave the channel in its line-up led to a dispute that has now lasted several years.

The channel is on the CNA's annual must-carry list, which obliges cable operators to include it in their offer, and it appears on the list for 2026 as well. In September 2026 it was carried by Digi, Orange and Vodafone and streamed live on its website, on YouTube and on Facebook.

== Expansion of the Aleph project ==
Aleph Business and Smart TV went on air in September 2021, a year after Aleph News, online only to begin with and for the most part with content taken from the news channel. Aleph Business was one of the three thematic channels licensed in June 2019. Smart TV, a general-interest channel, had received its own licence earlier that month. It was a joint project with Tucă, run through a company in which he and Aleph Media held equal stakes. In June 2021 Aleph had announced that it was giving up the licence for Aleph Comedy.

In a text published for the first anniversary, Sârbu wrote that Aleph was o revoluție, neînțeleasă încă, "a revolution, not yet understood". He described the Aleph concept as an attempt to change the traditional way television is made and distributed, by bringing television content closer to digital formats.

In March 2024 the Media and Journalism Research Center published a profile of Aleph Media in its Media Influence Matrix database. The tables in the profile show the company's expenses rising from €2.1 million in 2019 to €12.8 million in 2021, and an average of 186 employees in 2022, up from 27 in 2019. According to the profile, more than €25 million had been invested in Aleph News.

== Dispute with RCS & RDS (Digi) ==
Since 2021 Aleph News has been in conflict with RCS & RDS, Romania's largest cable operator, over its place in the Digi line-up. CNA rules require channels to be grouped by theme, and Aleph News had must-carry status from March 2021, but the operator kept it near the end of the line-up, away from the main news channels, among them Digi24, which belongs to the operator's own group. At a CNA hearing in November 2021 RCS & RDS said the order could only change at the start of a year, while Sârbu accused it of abusing its dominant position.

The CNA fined the operator 10,000 lei in December 2021 and 20,000 lei in February 2022, when Sârbu put the channel's losses at €50,000 a month. In May it fined RCS & RDS again, this time over the placing of NCN. That spring the Competition Council opened an investigation into a possible abuse of a dominant position, following a complaint from Aleph. Its president said the operator held more than half of the retransmission market.

In May 2022 Sârbu backed a Senate amendment obliging large distributors to carry new channels free for a year, while RCS & RDS said lawmakers should not arbitrate between competitors. Law 190/2022, promulgated in June, required operators to group channels by category and to carry new channels free of charge. In July Aleph Media sued RCS & RDS for damages. By September the courts had upheld the CNA fines, and after another summons the operator announced in October that all 14 news channels, Aleph News included, would form a single block. HotNews later noted that the dispute had led to fines and, eventually, a change in the law.

The new block was in place by July 2023, but that year Sârbu complained to the CNA twice that the channel was still missing from the operator's satellite platform. In January 2024 the Competition Council put out for consultation the commitments RCS & RDS offered to close the case, including a stable line-up and a trustee to monitor it. The investigation was still open in November 2025, and International Press Institute reports from 2024 and 2025 cite the case as an example of the ties between telecom operators and the press. In September 2026 the lawsuit was still at first instance, and the operator had meanwhile changed its name to Digi România.
