= Adrian Sârbu =

- Sârbu in 2026
- Born: 18 April 1955 (age 71); Brașov, Romania
- Education: Institute of Theatre and Film Arts (IATC), Bucharest
- Occupations: Media executive, businessman, film director and producer
- Years active: 1980–present
- Known for: Founder of Pro TV, Mediafax and the Media Pro group; president and CEO of Central European Media Enterprises (2009–2013); founder of Aleph News
- Children: 3

Adrian Sârbu (born 18 April 1955) is a Romanian media executive, businessman, film director and producer. He founded the Media Pro group, the Mediafax news agency, the radio station Pro FM and Pro TV, still the biggest television station in Romania, along with its sister channels Acasă and Pro Cinema, the newspapers ProSport and Ziarul Financiar, the MediaPro studios at Buftea, the production company MediaPro Pictures and the media school run by his Fundația Pro. A large part of the people working in Romanian television passed through Pro TV, which the sociologist Alfred Bulai has called a school of television. Business rankings put him among the richest media owners in the country. Ronald Lauder's Central European Media Enterprises (CME) had been his partner in Pro TV since 1995. He sold it his television and production companies, and from 2009 to 2013 he ran the Nasdaq-listed group as its president and chief executive. The Romanian press called it the highest executive job a Romanian had ever held in an American multinational. He left CME in 2013 and in 2020 started Aleph News, the news channel he still leads.

== Early life and film career ==
Sârbu was born on 18 April 1955 in Brașov. He studied film directing at the Institute of Theatre and Film Arts (IATC) in Bucharest. In 1980 he worked as assistant director to Andrei Blaier on the television series Lumini și umbre, according to the cinematographer Alexandru Doru Spătaru, who was an assistant cameraman on the same production.

He was then hired by the Alexandru Sahia studio, the state documentary studio in Bucharest, as part of a group of young directors who joined it at the start of the 1980s. Adevărul has written that he made more than 150 documentaries there. The best known of them is Aflați despre mine că sunt bine, sănătos, ceea ce vă doresc la fel... (1982), a 17-minute colour film written by Mircea Bunescu and initially titled Căminiștii. Shot in workers' hostels, it follows young people brought from the countryside to work in Bucharest industry and the loss of bearings that came with the move. The film was included on the first Sahia Vintage DVD published by the One World Romania association, and the critic Andrei Gorzo described it as remarkably consistent in the melancholy with which it looks at these lives, with heavily staged camera movements by Sârbu and his cinematographer Mircea Bunescu. It has since been shown in archive programmes on housing in socialist Bucharest, and in 2026 it was screened at the One World Romania festival, under the English title I For One Am Alive and Well..., alongside a short by Jiří Menzel. Forbes România noted in 2017 that this period is one that former media figures who worked in the state audiovisual sector tend to leave out of their biographies.

== The 1989 revolution and politics ==
On 22 December 1989 Sârbu was inside the building of the Communist Party Central Committee, where he filmed the meetings that produced the new leadership. According to Adevărul, participants in the revolution described him as close to Silviu Brucan, who brought him into the building, and he made his first money selling the footage to foreign television networks. In 2014 he released a previously unseen recording of the constitution of the Council of the National Salvation Front on 22 December 1989.

After the revolution he became a member of the National Salvation Front Council, the provisional governing body, as secretary of state for the press. In Petre Roman's government he held the same rank and was responsible for the executive's communication and image. Prosecutors in the Mineriad case later described him as the prime minister's chief of staff and adviser. World Screen wrote that in this role he promoted the country's first audiovisual law, which opened the way to privately owned television. He left politics after the events of 13 to 15 June 1990 in Bucharest, known as the Mineriad, although Adevărul noted that he remained close to people in power.

== Media Pro and Pro TV ==
=== Building the group ===
Sârbu founded Media Pro on his own in September 1990, four years before Ronald Lauder became involved. In 1991 Media Pro launched Mediafax, the first independent news agency in post-communist Romania. Mihnea Vasiliu, who joined it as a reporter that autumn and later ran Publimedia and Mediafax, remembered a company of 30 people in which the owner sat next to his staff. The radio station Pro FM followed in 1993, and the same year Sârbu obtained a licence for a sports channel, Canal 31, and put it on air in Bucharest with a team drawn in part from the private stations SOTI and Amerom. By the spring of 1995 Media Pro, which Bermuda's Royal Gazette described as the largest Romanian media group, held several regional television licences and four radio stations.

Canal 31 was already broadcasting when Sârbu met Lauder in 1994. He later said that Lauder, whom he had won over in a fifteen-minute presentation, had been the only one to give him a hand, and that this had allowed him to relaunch the channel. Adevărul put the investment at $20 million. In April 1995 Media Pro and CME, the company Lauder had set up to build commercial television in the former Eastern Bloc, formed Media Pro International with the aim of winning a licence for a national commercial network; Ion Țiriac was Sârbu's partner in the television venture. Pro TV went on air on 1 December 1995, replacing Canal 31, with Sârbu as general director and president of its board, posts he held until 2009. Within a year Pro TV reached 55 percent of the population and took about 40 percent of television advertising revenue. By 1996 CME owned 77.5 percent of Media Pro International, with Sârbu and Țiriac holding the rest and most of the licence company Pro TV SRL. A second channel, Acasă, was launched in February 1998 and was followed by Pro TV Internațional in 2000, Pro Cinema in 2004 and, in 2007, Sport.ro and the Romanian licence of MTV.

Pro TV took over the market fast. In January 1997, little more than a year after the launch, The Christian Science Monitor reported that the station already dominated the ratings in Bucharest and other cities and had taken the lion's share of viewers and advertising revenue from the state broadcaster TVR. Rather than hiring from state television, it had recruited young print journalists and film school graduates and sent them to CNN and the BBC for training, and most observers quoted by the newspaper credited it with starting a revolution in news reporting.

Then came the elections of 1996, in which Emil Constantinescu and the Romanian Democratic Convention beat Ion Iliescu, and Pro TV's part in the result has been discussed ever since. During the campaign Pro TV ran a large drive to bring voters to the polls under the slogan "Votezi și câștigi" ("You vote and you win"), built around Pro TV postcards that became so sought after that, according to the media analyst Iulian Comănescu, who worked at the station at the time, they were sold under the counter at post offices. The station also reported live from polling stations across the country. The Christian Science Monitor reported that many credited the station's news coverage with helping to topple Iliescu's government, quoted the sociologist Gabriel Andreescu as saying that Pro TV had been "essential to the political changes" and noted that pollsters had found the areas won by the opposition closely matched its broadcast reach. The station's chief news editor, Lucian Mîndruță, told the newspaper that Pro TV had responded to a public demand for more open news rather than caused the result. Adevărul has written that the channel played a decisive part in the change of power, a role later acknowledged even by the losing side, and Comănescu has argued that the 1996 elections were won by Pro TV a year earlier, in the street, through the mass events the channel staged. Sârbu himself said in 2025 that Pro TV had brought Constantinescu to power and that Constantinescu had acknowledged it.

After the elections the station threw itself into the campaign for NATO membership. Ahead of the 1997 Madrid summit it ran a "Pro NATO" campaign in which viewers deposited postcards in the courtyard of its headquarters for a prize of one billion lei, moved its news team to Madrid for the summit and, after Romania was left out of the first wave of enlargement, covered Bill Clinton's speech to the crowd in University Square on 11 July 1997. Sârbu has said that NATO membership became Pro TV's main objective after 1996 and that the station spent $2 million of its shareholder's money promoting Romania abroad, and he counts the country's admission to NATO in 2004 and to the European Union in 2007 among the outcomes to which Pro TV contributed. Adevărul has argued that after 2004 Sârbu kept the channel out of political games.

Television was only part of it. In 1996 Media Pro was a 30 percent partner in Mobil Rom, the consortium led by France Télécom that won one of Romania's first two GSM licences and launched the Dialog network in 1997, later rebranded Orange România. When France Télécom bought out the remaining minority shareholders in 2005, the sellers were financial investors led by the AIG New Europe Fund and Alcatel, funds that had come into the company in 1999. In 1998 Media Pro bought the state film studios at Buftea, which dated from the 1950s, and turned them into MediaPro Studios and the production company MediaPro Pictures. MediaPro Pictures produced, among other films, Cristian Nemescu's California Dreamin', which won the Un Certain Regard prize at Cannes in 2007. In 2000 the group opened Hollywood Multiplex in Bucharest Mall, the first multiplex cinema in Romania. In 2006 it added a distribution arm, MediaPro Distribution, which released the group's own productions and other titles in Romanian cinemas and was among the companies sold to CME in 2009. Sârbu has also produced films himself: he was the producer of Jiří Menzel's The Don Juans (2013), made by Media Pro Pictures with TV Nova and submitted by the Czech Republic for the Academy Award for Best Foreign Language Film, and of Cristina Jacob's Oh, Ramona! (2019).

Publishing was organised under PubliMedia International. The sports daily ProSport was launched in 1997, sold to the Swiss group Ringier in 2003 and bought back in 2008. On 16 November 1998 Sârbu launched Ziarul Financiar, a daily devoted to business and finance, at an event hosted by the National Bank of Romania. The paper outlasted almost everything else in the group and stayed identified with him long after the television and entertainment side had gone to CME. In May 2006 PubliMedia bought 60 percent of the company publishing Gândul, the daily founded a year earlier by Cristian Tudor Popescu and a group of journalists who had left Adevărul; at the time PubliMedia's portfolio included twelve magazines, among them Business Magazin, Pro TV Magazin and ProMotor, and seven regional newspapers. In May 2008 MediaPro Management bought 50.1 percent of the London-listed film distributor Metrodome Group from Germany's TV-Loonland, in a deal that valued Metrodome at about £3.2 million. Media Pro's combined sales for 2007 were put at €93 million.

Besides the commercial companies, Sârbu set up a charitable foundation, Fundația Pro, in 1997. It concentrated on education and in 1999 launched The Media University, a private school teaching journalism and other media disciplines. In 2007 Media Pro Pictures registered a Czech subsidiary in Prague, which took part in co-productions with Czech Television.

=== Selling to CME ===
The ownership of the Romanian companies changed hands several times over. In March 2003, after a new audiovisual law required licence holders to run their own stations, CME agreed with Sârbu and Țiriac to raise its stake in Pro TV from 49 to 66 percent and to move broadcasting from Media Pro International, of which it then held 66 percent, into Pro TV. In July 2004 Sârbu obtained put options giving him the right to sell his remaining shares to CME at a floor price of $1.45 million for each percentage point. In February 2006 CME bought a further 5 percent in Pro TV and Media Pro International from him for $27.2 million, taking its holding to 90 percent, and at the same time put him in charge of its Czech, Slovak and Romanian operations. Sârbu said the money would go into new Media Pro projects, and CME's chief executive Michael Garin said the group's Romanian plans amounted to backing Sârbu's vision because nobody knew the market better. Another 5 percent followed in June 2007 for $49.8 million, leaving him with 5 percent of each company. Until 2006 he had held 15 percent and a veto right over decisions.

CME also bought businesses from Media Pro directly. In April 2008 it paid 47.2 million lei (about $20.6 million) for the radio assets of Compania de Radio Pro, owner of Pro FM and Info Pro. The largest transaction came in July 2009, when CME agreed to buy the Media Pro Entertainment business, comprising MediaPro Pictures, MediaPro Studios, Media Pro Distribution, Pro Video, Media Pro Music, Hollywood Multiplex, a Czech production arm and a majority of the commercials producer Domino. The price was $10 million in cash, 2.2 million CME class A shares, a warrant over a further 850,000 shares at $21.75, the assumption of about $35.6 million of debt and the return to Sârbu of CME's minority interests in his holding companies. CME estimated his economic interest in the deal at about $67 million at the share price of the day, while Merrill Lynch, quoted by Ziarul Financiar, valued the whole transaction at $97.6 million. Media Pro Entertainment had 2008 revenues of $95 million, 40 percent of them from contracts with CME, and produced more than 500 hours of drama and feature films a year. The deal closed on 9 December 2009. The Media Pro name and trademarks went to CME together with the companies, while Sârbu kept Publimedia, Mediafax, the printing business Coprint, Indoor Media, MediaSat, Media Pro Interactiv and Metrodome. In May 2010 he sold his last 5 percent of Pro TV, Media Pro International and Media Vision to CME for $24.7 million, made up of about $6.2 million in cash and 800,000 CME shares, which cancelled the 2004 put options. Two years later CME also bought from him Pro Digital, the company behind Pro TV Chișinău in Moldova, for €0.7 million. MediaPro Studios, which had passed to CME in 2009, was sold on by CME in 2015 to a group of investors including the director Bobby Păunescu.

The Romanian rich lists have put Sârbu among the wealthiest media owners in the country. In 2008 the Capital Top 300 valued his fortune at €150–155 million and ranked him 49th overall, while Adevărul put it at €250 million and 40th; Forbes Romania estimated it at €110 million in 2009 and €120 million in 2010.

== Central European Media Enterprises ==
=== Rise to chief executive ===
While he was selling, he was also moving up inside CME. On 23 February 2006 the company put him in charge of a new operating group covering Romania, the Czech Republic and Slovakia, describing him as a key top manager who had run its Romanian stations for a decade and made them the model for its other television companies. He became chief operating officer in October 2007 and president at the start of 2009, and on 27 July 2009, the day the Media Pro Entertainment agreement was signed, the board appointed him president and chief executive officer, succeeding Michael Garin. Lauder called him the most talented executive he had worked with, and Romanian media described the appointment as the highest executive post ever held by a Romanian in an American multinational. His contract ran to the end of 2013 with a salary of $1.8 million a year plus bonuses tied to EBITDA targets, and he moved to Prague, where CME's operating headquarters were. He joined the board on 8 December 2009. Once the entertainment deal closed he held about 5 percent of CME's shares, making him one of its largest individual shareholders. He sold parcels of the stock at regular intervals from 2010, and by early 2013 his holding had fallen to about 3.2 percent. CME also bought programming and services from companies connected to him, purchases it disclosed as related-party transactions of about $51.8 million in 2008 and $33.1 million in 2009.

=== Strategy and results ===
He took over as the recession cut advertising across the region, and spent his first months on restructuring, with the loss-making Ukrainian and Croatian operations first in line. In 2010 CME sold its Ukrainian channels to the businessman and CME director Igor Kolomoisky for $300 million and put the proceeds towards buying the Bulgarian market leader bTV from News Corporation for $400 million, merging into it Pro.BG, the channel CME had bought in 2008 while Sârbu was chief operating officer. He described the two deals as steps in repositioning CME as a vertically integrated media company concentrated on the European Union and its accession countries. Media Pro Entertainment was folded into a single content division serving all the group's territories. His other main initiative was Voyo, a video-on-demand service launched in the Czech Republic at the start of 2011 and rolled out to Croatia, Romania and Slovakia within the year, which he presented to analysts as a pilot for his strategy of "one content, multiple distributions". A 2024 Médiář retrospective recalled that he had wanted to turn Voyo into a "Central European Netflix". The service later became CME's main streaming platform and went on to pass a million subscribers across its markets. He ran the group from Prague, where he also served as managing director of CET 21, the licence holder of TV Nova, from July 2010 until April 2012, and where a Czech news agency he had launched under the Mediafax name in 2008 was sold to CET 21 for one euro in 2010 after running at a loss.

The share price fell from more than $120 in 2007 to about $21 in mid-2009 and the company kept reporting losses: $179.6 million in 2011, then $546.4 million in 2012 on revenue down 11 percent to $772.1 million. In April 2012 Time Warner and Lauder agreed to fund tender offers for up to $300 million of CME's notes, in a set of transactions that took Time Warner's economic interest to 49.9 percent by the end of the year. Presenting the 2012 results, Sârbu said that hard times demanded bold steps: higher advertising prices, and higher fees from the cable and satellite operators that carried CME's channels. In June 2013 he confirmed plans to raise prime-time prices in every market, doubling them in the Czech Republic, where results were weakest. In Romania, Pro TV was taken off the must-carry list that July so that cable operators would have to pay for it. In the Czech Republic the policy backfired: large advertisers moved their money to the rival Prima, which overtook Nova in advertising revenue for the first time in the history of Czech television, and CME's Czech revenues fell by almost a third in 2013.

=== Resignation ===
The board still backed him in 2013. On 4 April it extended his contract to the end of 2016, on the same salary. Four months later, on 21 August 2013, two months after the European Commission cleared Time Warner to take control of CME and weeks after the group reported a first-half loss of $150 million, he resigned as president and chief executive. He said his mission at CME was accomplished and that the company was well positioned for the future. Lauder thanked him for the passion, dedication and creative vision he had shown since 1995 and credited him with CME's multi-channel strategy, its new media initiatives and with keeping the group's stations in the lead through difficult economic conditions. CME's shares rose 12 percent on the Prague exchange on the announcement. He stayed on the payroll until the end of the year. Under the separation agreement he received $5.4 million and kept a right of first refusal should CME sell its Romanian operations. On 16 September 2013 the board appointed Michael Del Nin and Christoph Mainusch as co-chief executives. Lauder resigned as chairman in March 2014, and a rights offering that spring took Time Warner's economic interest above 70 percent. The board said it would keep the strategy Sârbu had set, including the higher advertising prices and carriage fees, and his successors did. CME was back in operating profit in 2014, its first full year without him, and revenue and operating profit grew again in 2015 and 2016.

== Mediafax Group ==
The publishing, news agency and online businesses that Sârbu kept out of the CME deal were brought together in 2010 as Mediafax Group. The group closed the print edition of Gândul in 2011 and moved ProSport online in November 2013, leaving Ziarul Financiar as its only daily still in print. The chief executive, Orlando Nicoară, resigned in November 2014 and Sârbu took over the post himself in December.

He then sold the group's titles one by one. In 2019 ProSport, ProMotor, Gândul, Descoperă, Ce se întâmplă, doctore?, Apropo TV and Go4IT went to Radu Budeanu, the founder of the tabloid Cancan, with the proceeds going to the creditor bank ING; the magazine The One was sold to the property developer One United Properties the same year. In January 2022 the furniture entrepreneur Dan Șucu bought ING's claim, which represented more than half of the money owed by the group, with the stated aim of becoming its main shareholder. Mediafax Group had reported a turnover of €4.2 million and losses of €1.1 million for 2020. In 2023 Ziarul Financiar and Business Magazin, with their websites, equipment and staff, were transferred to Mediamex Investment, a company owned 51 percent by Șucu and 49 percent by Sârbu, who is its general manager. The Mediafax brand itself, with the website, the photo agency and the news feed, was sold by Mediamex on 8 January 2025 to Budeanu's Titluri Quality, for about €990,000 plus VAT according to Profit.ro. After that sale the only media businesses he still controlled were the Aleph television channels.

== Aleph ==
In June 2019 the National Audiovisual Council granted licences for three channels to Aleph Media: Aleph Business, Aleph News and Aleph Comedy. Sârbu told the council that the channels were aimed at a public with above-average income and higher education that did not find its place in cable television, that he intended to invest €14 million in them, and that two more channels, on education and lifestyle, would follow, all of them to be gathered eventually on a Netflix-style platform. Earlier that month the council had licensed Smart TV, a general channel he founded with the journalist Marius Tucă.

Aleph News began broadcasting at the start of September 2020. Sârbu presented it as the first "social television" channel, a project for the 21st century that would create its own market among people consuming news and entertainment on their phones, "those who have abandoned or have been abandoned by traditional television". The channel was formatted for vertical 9:16 viewing on mobile phones as well as for television, and was carried by Vodafone, Telekom, Orange, iNES and NextGen but not, at launch, by the largest cable operator, RCS&RDS. Many of his former collaborators from Pro TV joined the team. Sârbu fought a long dispute with RCS&RDS over the placing of the channel near the bottom of its programme guide, among other small news stations. The council fined the operator repeatedly for not grouping news channels together, and the operator complied only after Parliament amended the audiovisual law. Aleph Business followed; Aleph Comedy was dropped.

== Personal life ==
Sârbu has been married twice and has three daughters.

== Legacy and influence ==
In Romania Sârbu is known as the father of Pro TV, and often of commercial television as such. When he left CME in 2013, Forbes România wrote that the launch of Pro TV had been more than the birth of a commercial channel: it was the foundation stone of the Romanian television market. Adevărul calls him the country's first television mogul. The Christian Science Monitor, reporting from Bucharest in January 1997, found a station with American-style production, a newsroom of young journalists with no television past, and competitors, state television included, copying its formats. Most of the observers the newspaper spoke to credited it with a revolution in news reporting. Alfred Bulai's view is that Pro TV was a school. It was run from the start like an American network, paid and trained its staff as no Romanian broadcaster had, and a large part of the country's television professionals came through it. The presenters it made famous in the late 1990s, Andreea Esca and Florin Călinescu among them, were dubbed the "Pro generation". Its part in the 1996 change of government is treated in the Romanian press as a settled fact, and Iulian Comănescu wrote in 2015 that no station since has had the power to change the political order the way Pro TV did then. Two of his other creations outlasted his television career by a long way. Mediafax, the first independent news agency in post-communist Romania, was his until January 2025, and as of 2025 he co-owns and runs Ziarul Financiar through Mediamex Investment.

People who worked for him describe a hard boss. Brăduț Florescu, a former Pro TV employee, says Sârbu ran the station almost as a dictator, but that the dictatorship was fed by passion and by a magnetic vision he pushed everyone around him towards. Lucian Georgescu of GAV Advertising called him "a Romanian Citizen Kane" to whom the history of broadcasting in the country owes an enormous amount.

== Media ventures ==
Year	Venture	Field	Later history
1990	Media Pro	Holding brand for the group	Name and trademarks sold to CME in 2009
1991	Mediafax	News agency	Sold to Titluri Quality in January 2025
1993	Pro FM	Radio	Sold to CME with Info Pro in 2008
1995	Pro TV	Television	Stakes sold to CME between 2003 and 2010
1996	Mobil Rom (Dialog)	Mobile telephony, 30 percent stake	Became Orange România; remaining minority holders bought out by France Télécom in 2005
1997	ProSport	Sports daily	Sold to Ringier in 2003, bought back in 2008, sold to Radu Budeanu in 2019
1997	Fundația Pro	Charitable foundation for education	Launched The Media University in 1999
1998	MediaPro Studios and MediaPro Pictures	Film studios and production	Sold to CME in 2009; studios sold on in 2015
1998	Acasă	Television	Part of Pro TV, sold with it
1998	Ziarul Financiar	Business daily	Transferred to Mediamex Investment in 2023
2000	Hollywood Multiplex	Cinema	Sold to CME in 2009, sold on in 2016
2006	Gândul (60 percent)	Daily newspaper	Print edition closed in 2011; sold to Radu Budeanu in 2019
2008	Metrodome Group (50.1 percent)	UK film distribution	Kept out of the CME deal
2008	Mediafax (Czech Republic)	News agency in Prague	Sold to CET 21 for one euro in 2010, wound down in 2012
2020	Aleph News, Aleph Business	Television	His remaining media business after the sale of Mediafax in 2025
