= Marius Tucă =

Romanian journalist

Marius Tucă (born 29 July 1966) is a Romanian journalist and TV host.

== Biography ==
He was born in Caracal, Olt County. He distinguished himself in the 1990s as a political analyst and a TV host. He also contributed to the transformation of the Jurnalul Național newspaper into the best selling broadsheet in Romania. In 1997–1998, he hosted Milionarii de la miezul nopții on Antena 1. After 1998, the show was named Marius Tucă Show. The TV show ceased in 2005. A short spell of the TV talk show in fall 2007 flopped and, from 2008, he was again working exclusively only the newspaper. As of 2011, he was the owner of the Taverna Sârbului restaurant in Bucharest.

From 1 September 2020, after Aleph News (the new television station of Adrian Sârbu) was launched, the Marius Tucă Show returned, after a long break, with new topics, and new guests every night. As of 2024, the TV show is hosted by the Gândul online newspaper; regular guests include Dan Dungaciu, H.D. Hartmann, and Ion Cristoiu.
