= Oh, Ramona! =

- Theatrical release poster
- Directed by: Cristina Jacob
- Screenplay by: Cristina Jacob; Andrei Ciobanu; Alex Cotet
- Based on: Suck It, Ramona! by Andrei Ciobanu
- Produced by: Adrian Sarbu; Daniel Iacob
- Starring: Bogdan Iancu; Aggy K. Adams; Holly Horne; Basil Eidenbenz; Leonardo Boudreau; Andromeda Godfrey; Melanie Ebanks
- Cinematography: J.P. Garcia
- Edited by: Gabriel Tudor Marin; Dragos Teglas
- Music by: Hahaha Production; Avanpost
- Production company: Zazu Film
- Distributed by: Jacob Bros
- Release date: 14 February 2019 (Romania)
- Running time: 109 minutes
- Country: Romania
- Language: English
- Budget: Budget €2.5 million

Oh, Ramona! is a 2019 Romanian English-language coming-of-age comedy directed by Cristina Jacob, adapted from Suge-o, Ramona! (Suck It, Ramona!), an autobiographical novel by the Romanian comedian Andrei Ciobanu. Bogdan Iancu plays Andrei, a shy teenager torn between Ramona (Aggy K. Adams), the most popular girl at his school, and Anemona (Holly Horne), a hotel receptionist he meets on holiday.

Produced by Zazu Film with support from Romania's National Film Centre, the film was released in Romanian cinemas by Jacob Bros on 14 February 2019 and worldwide on Netflix on 1 June 2019. It was given the widest release a Romanian film had ever had, opened bigger than any Romanian film in decades, topped the Romanian box office for two weekends and became the first Romanian production to gross more than US$1 million at home. It ended its run with 256,115 admissions, more than any Romanian film released since 2002 and the highest of any Romanian film of 2019, which brought it the Audience Award at the 2020 Gopo Awards.

== Plot ==
Andrei, a shy sixteen-year-old from Brașov, tells his own story, speaking directly to the audience. For years he has been in love with Ramona, the most popular girl at his school, who barely notices him. At a party Ramona unexpectedly makes a move on him, but Andrei, who wants a real relationship rather than a one-night stand, turns her down. The rejection sets off a chain of humiliations as his clumsy attempts to win her over go wrong in front of the whole school.

His mother, who is raising him alone, takes him on a seaside holiday. There he meets Anemona, the receptionist at their hotel, who is won over by his sincerity and awkward charm, and Andrei's first real romance begins. Back home, Ramona returns to his life, and he finds himself caught between the girl he idealised for years and the one who actually wants him.

== Cast ==
- Aggy K. Adams as Ramona
- Holly Horne as Anemona
- Bogdan Iancu as Andrei
- Adina Stetcu as Raluca
- Basil Eidenbenz as Alin
- Mihaela Mihut as Psychologist
- Leonardo Boudreau as Silviu
- Andromeda Godfrey as Alfred (Andrei's Mother)
- Melanie Ebanks as Carla
- Ioachim Ciobanu as The Priest
- Cosmin Dominte as The Pelican
- Smiley as a policeman
- Howard Dell as Bodyguard
- Andrei Ciobanu as Bartender Hotel
- Cristina Ich as Girl in Alin's flat

== Production ==
=== Development and writing ===
Andrei Ciobanu's Suge-o, Ramona! grew out of a story about a girl he had liked in high school, which he posted on Facebook in September 2013. The book was published on 14 February 2015 and became a bestseller in Romania; the online story had drawn more than a million readers, and Ciobanu later continued it in a sequel, Suge-o, Andrei!. Jacob approached Ciobanu in the summer of 2016 about adapting it, and Ciobanu, Jacob and Alex Coteț wrote the screenplay together over about six months. The project was announced in late 2016 as Jacob's fourth feature, under the working title Confessions of a Teenager. The adaptation moved Andrei's home town from Suceava, where the book is set, to Brașov.

The film was produced by Zazu Film, with Adrian Sârbu as producer and Daniel Iacob as executive producer, and distributed in Romania by Jacob Bros. Its budget of more than €2.5 million, large by Romanian standards, was partly covered by the National Film Centre. Jacob later said the financing combined a loan from the Centre with a bank loan and other sources. She chose to shoot in English with a largely international cast, describing the film as a portrait of a generation of Romanian teenagers who live by Western models and whose vocabulary takes in more English every day. She also gave practical reasons: English let her cast actors from anywhere and made the film easier to sell abroad. Ciobanu put it more bluntly, saying the team wanted to measure itself against American films rather than weaker ones.

=== Casting ===
Casting ran for several months in Romania, the United Kingdom and the United States, with candidates for the lead considered from all three countries and from Bucharest, Iași and Cluj. Jacob said around 10,000 actors were seen. The part of Andrei went to Bogdan Iancu, a Bucharest actor who had worked since childhood, was known to Romanian television audiences as Mihăiță in the series Pariu cu viața, and was still in high school when the film was made. Ramona is played by Aggy K. Adams, a Polish-born actress who grew up in the United States and is based in London, and Anemona by the British actress Holly Horne. The director opted for a mix of foreign and Romanian actors, and Romanian celebrities appear in smaller parts, among them the singers Smiley and Feli, the author Andrei Ciobanu, Cristina Ich, Laura Giurcanu, Gina Pistol and Gabriel Jugaru, alongside Howard Dell. Jacob and Iancu worked together again on her next feature, The Perfect Escape, in which he also took a leading role.

=== Filming ===
Principal photography took place in the summer of 2017 and wrapped at the end of September, after 35 shooting days; from development to the end of the shoot, the production took about three and a half years. Locations included Bucharest, Brașov and Constanța. J. P. Garcia was the cinematographer, Cristina Paula Ana Barbu the production designer and Doina Levintza the costume designer. Jacob avoided explicit sex scenes, cutting instead to visual metaphors, many of them involving desserts, at the moments of Andrei's erotic discoveries.

=== Music ===
The soundtrack was produced by HaHaHa Production, the label of the singer Smiley, with Jacob coordinating the recordings. Smiley said the brief gave the team unusual freedom, since the music did not have to follow what was popular in Romania at the time, and HaHaHa producer Șerban Cazan said the label wanted to release the songs as a compilation.

== Release ==
=== Marketing and premiere ===
The trailer was released on 21 December 2018, revealing that the film had been shot in English. The campaign leaned on Ciobanu's readership and on the cast. Jacob and Ciobanu promoted the film in live online sessions with Ciobanu's radio colleague Ionuț Rusu, tickets for the preview screenings went on sale in advance, and in the run-up to the opening Jacob said more than half of them had already been sold. The gala preview was held at Cinema City in Bucharest's AFI Cotroceni mall, attended by Romanian television personalities, with guests invited to come in pyjamas, slippers or wrapped in a blanket; it was followed by a roast in which Jacob, Ciobanu, Iancu and Adams traded jokes about one another and about the celebrities appearing in the film. Gala screenings followed in other cities, among them Galați, with the director and cast present. After the Netflix release, videos with Iancu on Ciobanu's YouTube channel and on that of the YouTuber Mimi each passed a million views.

=== Theatrical and streaming ===
Oh, Ramona! opened with preview screenings in 49 cities on 13 and 14 February 2019, timed for Valentine's Day, and went into general release on 15 February, distributed by Jacob Bros. It was rated AP-12, parental guidance for children under 12, and opened on 109 screens in 50 cities, the widest release a Romanian film had ever received. Jacob Bros, which also held the rights for the United Kingdom and France, said talks were under way for theatrical distribution there and in other countries. Netflix released the film worldwide on 1 June 2019, in 190 countries and translated into 33 languages, alongside Jacob's earlier films.

== Reception ==
=== Box office ===
The opening was the biggest for a Romanian production in decades. The film sold 30,243 tickets on a single day, 71,294 over its first three days and 111,881 between the Wednesday previews and the following Sunday, a five-day total that Film New Europe called a record for a Romanian film in the last 30 years, with a gross of 2,209,669 lei (about €470,000), more than Black Panther had taken on its Romanian opening. Writing for Cinemagia, Ștefan Dobroiu called it the best debut for a Romanian film in decades and set it against Garcea și oltenii, the most popular Romanian film of the millennium up to then, which had sold about 252,000 tickets over three months in 2002 but only 34,000 on its opening weekend, at a time when Romania had far fewer cinemas; he added that the numbers stood comparison with Hollywood openings. The previous opening record for a Romanian film had belonged to Jacob's own Selfie 69 (2016), which finished with 150,536 admissions, after her #Selfie (2014) had led the domestic films of its year with 87,288.

Oh, Ramona! opened at number one on the Romanian weekend chart with US$526,488 on 109 screens, against US$370,379 for Alita: Battle Angel, and held first place the following weekend ahead of the new release Cold Pursuit. By then it was the highest-grossing film of 2019 in Romania to that point, ahead of How to Train Your Dragon: The Hidden World, Ralph Breaks the Internet, Glass, Vice and The Favourite. A second week of 77,327 admissions took the total to 189,208, on 92 screens in 48 cities, and after a third weekend in the top three it stood at 225,951 admissions, which the producers said made it the first Romanian film since 2002 to pass 200,000, and US$1,031,211 in takings, the first time a Romanian production had passed US$1 million at the domestic box office. After five weeks it had passed 250,000 admissions.

The film ran for twelve weeks. Its final tally, as reported by the National Film Centre and cited at the Gopo Awards, was 256,115 admissions and a gross of 5,016,367 lei, the highest of any Romanian film released in 2019 and above the 251,891 admissions Garcea și oltenii had recorded in 2002. Box Office Mojo puts the gross at US$1,200,582. Jacob nonetheless said the film had not made its backers rich: by her estimate a Romanian film needs about 600,000 admissions to recover its investment at home, and cinemas keep a large share of ticket revenue.

=== Accolades ===
At the Gopo Awards ceremony held on 29 June 2020, Oh, Ramona! received the Audience Award, presented to the domestic productions with the greatest box-office success of 2019.
