= Mediafax =

Romanian news agency

Mediafax (Romanian pronunciation: [ˌmedi.aˈfaks]) is a Romanian media company headquartered in Bucharest and founded in 1991 as the first undertaking of the MediaPro Group. Its lines of business include news, photography, and business information services. The company's Mediafax Business Information services, launched in 1994, include a variety of business news and data, such as currency market, business opportunities, calls for tender, statistics and company data.

== See also ==
- BBC
- CNN
- ITN
