= Doina Levintza =

Fashion designer

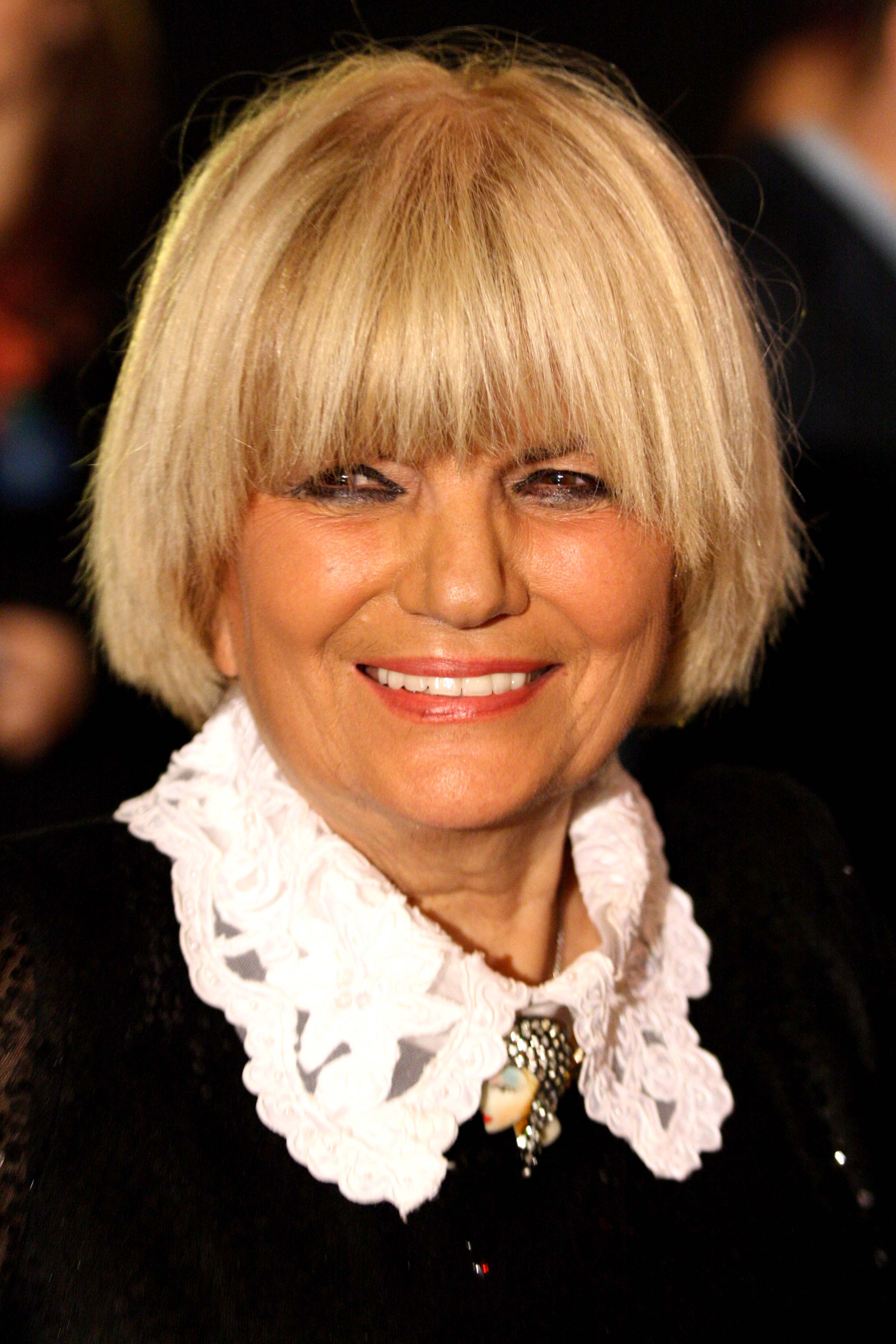
- Born: April 10, 1939 (age 87); Bucharest
- Occupations: scenographer, architect, designer
- Spouse: Dan Coma
- Awards: National Order of Merit (Romania)

Doina Levintza (born 10 April 1939, Bucharest) is a Romanian fashion designer. She is the official supplier of the Romanian royal family. She has held presentations of her eponymous label in Monte Carlo, Paris, Washington, New York, London, Prague, Geneva, Madrid, Berlin, Brussels, and Chicago.

== Awards ==
- National Order of Merit (Romania) (December 1, 2000) "for outstanding artistic achievements and for the promotion of culture, on Romania's National Day"
