= Selfie (2014 film) =

2014 Romanian teen comedy film

- Theatrical release poster
- Directed by: Cristina Jacob
- Written by: Cristina Jacob; Maria Spirache; Alexandru Molico; Geo Caraman
- Produced by: Cristina Dobrițoiu; Misu Predescu; Alexandra Marinescu
- Starring: Crina Semciuc; Olimpia Melinte; Flavia Hojda; Vlad Logigan; Levent Sali; Alexandru Călin; Răzvan Vasilescu; Alina Chivulescu; Răzvan Fodor; Florin Călinescu
- Cinematography: Viorel Sergovici
- Edited by: Ovidiu Văcaru
- Music by: Mihai Coporan
- Production companies: MediaPro Pictures; Zazu Film
- Distributed by: Zazu Film
- Release dates: 8 May 2014 (Bucharest (premiere)); 9 May 2014 (Romania)
- Running time: 123 minutes
- Country: Romania
- Language: Romanian
- Budget: €900,000 (approx.)
- Box office: 1.14 million lei (€260,000)

Selfie (stylised as #Selfie) is a 2014 Romanian teen comedy film, the first feature directed by Cristina Jacob, who is credited on it as Cristina Iacob. It follows three girls from Bucharest who run off to the Black Sea coast two days before their baccalaureate exam instead of studying, and the three young men they meet there. Crina Semciuc, Olimpia Melinte and Flavia Hojda play the leads. The cast also includes Vlad Logigan, Levent Sali, Alexandru Călin, Răzvan Vasilescu, Alina Chivulescu, Răzvan Fodor and Florin Călinescu, with television and pop personalities such as Mihaela Rădulescu, Dan Chișu, Smiley and Alex Velea in small parts. The film was produced by MediaPro Pictures and Zazu Film with support from Romania's National Film Centre (CNC) and cost about €900,000.

Released on 9 May 2014, Selfie was the most-watched Romanian film of the year at home: 87,288 tickets according to the CNC's official count for 2014, or 102,026 according to Cinemagia, which tracked it over the 25 weeks it stayed in cinemas. Romanian critics were mostly cold towards it, faulting the thin characters and the television comedy formula, but the film won the Audience Award at the 2015 Gopo Awards, where it was also nominated in four categories, and top prizes at two festivals abroad, the Broad Humor Film Festival in Los Angeles and the Southampton International Film Festival in England. Its success led to a sequel, Selfie 69, released in 2016.

== Plot ==
Yasmine, Roxi and Ana are classmates and best friends at a Bucharest high school. On the night of their graduation party, two days before the baccalaureate, the three drive off to the seaside in Yasmine's convertible, determined to live the weekend as if it were their last. Yasmine (Crina Semciuc) is a rich girl whose parents have given her everything money can buy and not much attention. She is secretly involved with Sergiu (Răzvan Fodor), her history teacher, who refused to be seen with her at the party; the trip is also her way of going after him. Roxi (Olimpia Melinte), self-conscious about her body and hooked on selfies, was brought up without rules by her mother Cecilia (Alina Chivulescu), a former hippie. Ana (Flavia Hojda), naive and a gifted guitar player, lost her mother early and grew up under the strict eye of her father, Nea Ceaușu (Răzvan Vasilescu), who still pines for the communist years.

Between the clubs of Mamaia and the beach at Vama Veche the girls run into Mihai (Levent Sali), George (Vlad Logigan) and Bogdan (Alexandru Călin), three friends who plan to pay for a summer of fun on the coast with stolen money. The two groups mix, couples form, and one scrape follows another until a car ends up in the sea. Back home, each parent reacts in a different way. Yasmine's mother and father (Mihaela Rădulescu and Dan Chișu) leave for Monaco and block her bank card. Cecilia trusts her daughter. Nea Ceaușu imagines the worst and sets off after the girls with Cecilia in his old bus, which is full of communist-era souvenirs and breaks down on the way. A police chief (Florin Călinescu) and two watermelon sellers by the roadside (Smiley and Alex Velea) get drawn into the story as well, the latter two turning up to rescue the young people at the moment when all seems lost. In the end Sergiu decides to stand by his relationship with Yasmine. An epilogue set a few months later shows one of the girls among the demonstrators protesting against the Roșia Montană mining project.

== Cast ==
The cast, with the characters as listed by Cinemagia:

- Crina Semciuc as Yasmine
- Olimpia Melinte as Roxana "Roxi" Popa
- Flavia Hojda as Ana
- Vlad Logigan as George
- Levent Sali as Mihai
- Alexandru Călin as Bogdan
- Răzvan Vasilescu as Nea Ceaușu, Ana's father
- Alina Chivulescu as Cecilia Popa, Roxi's mother
- Răzvan Fodor as Sergiu, the history teacher
- Mihaela Rădulescu as Yasmine's mother
- Dan Chișu as Yasmine's father
- Florin Călinescu as the police chief
- Nicoleta Luciu as Sergiu's girlfriend
- Carmen Tănase
- Smiley as a watermelon seller
- Alex Velea as a watermelon seller
- Anghel Damian as Rareș
- Constantin Florescu as the maths teacher
- Cătălin Cățoiu as Sergiu's friend
- George Vintilă as a petrol station employee
- Bogdan Cotleț as a policeman
- Ion Grosu as a policeman
- Titi Radoaie as a driver
- James Simenc as the voice of George (Magi)

Smiley and Alex Velea, who shot their scenes in a single day, play a gay couple selling watermelons on the roadside, parts Smiley described as small and there for colour. Andreea Esca is among the cameo appearances.

== Production ==
=== Script and title ===
Jacob wrote the screenplay with Maria Spirache, Alexandru Molico and Georgiana Alexandra "Geo" Caraman. She said she started first of all from her own experiences, being close in age to the characters, and that the scenes were then adapted together with the actors. The script went through 27 drafts. The title changed several times along the way. The project was first called Crazy Teens, then Liceenii 2000 ("High Schoolers 2000"), the title under which it was financed and shot, then Generația Y ("Generation Y"). Only in December 2013, when Jacob came across the word "selfie", did she decide that it described the film best, as a self-portrait of a generation. Jacob recalled that Smiley told her people would take it for a girl's name, since nobody knew what it meant. The word turned into a phenomenon in 2014 and the film's promotion was built around it, with characters photographing themselves on their phones throughout the story and posting the pictures on social media.

=== Financing ===
Under the title Liceenii 2000, MediaPro Pictures entered the project in the debut section of the CNC's 2012 funding competition. When the results were announced in April 2013 it received a credit of 800,000 lei, more than the top-scoring debut project in the same section, Adina Pintilie's Touch Me Not, which got 700,000 lei, even though its score had been almost half that of Pintilie's. AaRC, the film database of the Romanian Filmmakers' Union, puts the sum at roughly €180,000; Jacob later spoke, in an interview for Forbes, of €300,000 in CNC funding and said the project had come first in the debut section. She explained that the competition mattered not only for the money but as a guarantee towards the other financiers, without which nobody would risk investing in a film.

The total budget was about €900,000, a large sum for a Romanian film, covered by the CNC, by MediaPro Entertainment and by other financiers, according to producer Cristina Dobrițoiu. The film is a MediaPro Pictures production, a company of the MediaPro Entertainment România group, made in co-production with Zazu Film, the company Jacob had founded in 2011, which also handled the theatrical distribution. The CNC's catalogue of Romanian films lists it as a MediaPro Pictures and Zazu Film production made with CNC support, shot in HD. Speaking to Forbes, Jacob summed up her thinking behind the project: films are made to be seen, and she wants to make commercial films that one can live off; Selfie, in her words, is a light film, "almost like a shawarma, it's a summer film", and such films are needed.

=== Casting and rehearsals ===
Most of the actors were chosen through castings held across the country; Jacob said she had Vlad Logigan in mind from the time she was writing the script. Some of the non-professional performers were found on Facebook. The cast was put together on two levels: the young actors in the lead roles, Crina Semciuc, Olimpia Melinte, Flavia Hojda, Vlad Logigan, Levent Sali and Alexandru Călin, and established names in the adult parts, Răzvan Vasilescu, Alina Chivulescu, Răzvan Fodor, Carmen Tănase and Florin Călinescu, plus television and music stars in short appearances. Jacob insisted on rehearsals. The actors rehearsed for six weeks before the shoot, something she considers a must, all the more for a first-time director.

Flavia Hojda, a former finalist of X Factor and a first-year student at the UNATC film and theatre university when the film was shot, was in her first film role and said the more experienced actresses helped her a lot. Olimpia Melinte, who had just come off another project for which she had already gained weight, had to put on kilos again to play a teenager unhappy with her body; the press at the time spoke of ten kilograms. Logigan himself proposed the clown routine in George's part and learned magic tricks for the film. Mihaela Rădulescu and Dan Chișu, a well-known real-life couple almost two decades earlier, were cast as Yasmine's parents, an idea that amused Chișu. Răzvan Fodor admitted that the role of a teacher who is involved with a pupil had troubled him at first, particularly as the father of a little girl.

=== Filming ===
The film was shot in August and September 2013, over 27 shooting days in 12 locations, with a crew of 68 plus nine stunt performers. The story is set in Bucharest and on the coast, at Mamaia and Vama Veche. The most spectacular sequence, a car plunging into the sea, was shot on the evening of Friday 23 August 2013 near Tuzla. Stuntman Răzvan Puiu drove the car at around 60 km/h up an artificial pier built in the sea as a launch ramp and dropped into the water. The car had been prepared for almost a month for a scene lasting a few seconds, which Puiu described as the hardest job of his career because of the height of the drop, the shallow water and the shock on landing. The scene was filmed with ten cameras and was done in a single take. Shooting wrapped at the beginning of September 2013.

The budget allowed for night and underwater filming and for more elaborate post-production than on the MediaPro comedies of the preceding years. Olimpia Melinte recalled that her hardest scene was going into the sea at night after a storm had filled the water with seaweed, with the crew standing in the water as well. The sound mix was done in Paris, at a studio where Jacob ran into Roman Polanski, who told her he had rehearsed for eight weeks on Carnage. Viorel Sergovici was the cinematographer, Ovidiu Văcaru the editor and Adina Bucur the costume designer, and the film was shot in CinemaScope (2.35:1). It runs 123 minutes; the CNC catalogue of Romanian films gives 126 minutes.

=== Music ===
The score is credited to Mihai Coporan, but the songs came from Smiley and his team at HaHaHa Production, a collaboration Jacob repeated on her next film. The single "Nemuritori" ("Immortals"), the fourth from Smiley's album Acasă, came out on 24 April 2014, two weeks before the premiere, as part of the soundtrack. Its video, shot at the Capitol summer theatre in Bucharest, brings all the characters of the film together at a party. Smiley described the song as being about the age at which we all think we are immortal.

== Release ==
=== Theatrical run ===
The film was announced in April 2014 as the first comedy with and about young people to reach the big screen in years, in a campaign that compared it with Liceenii, the audience phenomenon of the late 1980s. The press screening was held on Tuesday 6 May 2014 at CinemaPRO in Bucharest, followed by a question-and-answer session with the director and the cast. The next day, Wednesday 7 May, a public preview took place at the Cinema City multiplex in the AFI Palace Cotroceni mall, attended by Smiley, Alex Velea and the main actors; tickets sold out. The gala premiere followed on Thursday evening, 8 May, at CinemaPRO, with Andreea Esca, Smiley and producers Andrei Boncea, Ruxandra Ion and Alma Bacula on the red carpet.

Selfie opened on Friday 9 May 2014, distributed by Zazu Film, in a network that included the Cinema City, Hollywood Multiplex, Grand Cinema & More and The Light multiplexes as well as older single-screen cinemas in towns such as Botoșani, Piatra Neamț, Râmnicu Vâlcea, Craiova and Slatina. Film New Europe counted 34 cinemas, mostly multiplexes, in 20 towns, with distribution handled by Zazu Film and MediaPro Distribution. More screens were added for the second week, and on 16 May the film also opened in Alba Iulia, Bacău and Iași, where the cast held a gala screening at the Republica cinema for 850 people, followed by an autograph session. The film was rated AP-12, meaning that children under 12 need parental accompaniment.

=== Festivals ===
Selfie was selected for the Romanian Days section of the 2014 Transilvania International Film Festival, where it screened on 5 June at the Florin Piersic cinema and on 6 June at the Mărăști cinema, with the cast present. In September 2014 it won the top prize, for best feature, at the ninth Broad Humor Film Festival in Los Angeles (5 to 7 September), a festival dedicated to comedy made by women; it was also selected for the official competition of the Lady Filmmakers Festival in Beverly Hills (26 to 28 September) and programmed at the 23rd St. Louis International Film Festival in Missouri (13 to 23 November). In Bucharest it was shown again at the White Night of Romanian Film on 19 September and at Bucharest Comedy Week at the end of that month. At the Southampton International Film Festival in England, where it had been nominated in six categories (best film, best director, best screenplay, best actress for Crina Semciuc, best editing and best supporting role for Bogdan Cotleț), it received three awards on 19 October 2014: the top prize for best film, best editing and best actress in a leading role, for Semciuc.

=== Television and streaming ===
Pro TV gave the film its television premiere on Sunday evening, 24 May 2015, at 20:30. It was later made available on Netflix.

== Reception ==
=== Box office ===
The producers released box office figures to the press week by week. On its opening weekend the film sold 12,648 tickets and took about 208,000 lei (€47,000), the best opening for a Romanian film that year up to then, and placed third overall behind The Amazing Spider-Man 2 and The Other Woman. In Constanța and Timișoara screenings were sold out from the Friday, and in Botoșani and Piatra Neamț it out-grossed The Amazing Spider-Man 2. Unusually for a Romanian film, the second weekend was better than the first, with 14,654 admissions; after ten days it had passed 37,000 admissions and 570,000 lei, with full houses in Iași, Constanța, Timișoara and Brăila. Jacob noted that, unlike Romanian films that disappear from cinemas after two or three weeks, Selfie kept a steady pace, with pleasant surprises in small towns such as Odobești, Onești, Focșani and Slobozia. The count rose to 61,000 admissions at the beginning of June, 76,617 in the seventh week, 80,908 in July, 90,703 at the end of August and passed 100,000 in October 2014, a threshold the director called a psychological one, hard to reach in Romania because of the shortage of cinemas in the country.

On 30 December 2014 the Cinemagia box office chart, to which producers report their results, recorded 102,026 admissions and takings of 1,147,487 lei over 25 weeks in cinemas, more than three times the figure of the next Romanian film of the year, Răzvan Săvescu's America, venim! (28,081 admissions), followed by Cuscrii (23,305) and Closer to the Moon (20,135). The CNC's official return for films released up to 31 December 2014 gives a lower figure, 87,288 admissions and 1,143,875 lei (€259,971), again in first place among Romanian productions, ahead of Cuscrii (23,507) and America, venim! (18,657). Set against the 218,064 admissions the CNC counted in 2014 for all 24 Romanian films released that year, Selfie alone accounted for roughly 40 percent of the audience for domestic films. In the cumulative lists the CNC published in later years the film appears with 87,653 admissions, a figure unchanged from 2019 to 2022. Neither the CNC nor Cinemagia explains the difference between the two counts. For comparison, the best-attended Romanian film of the previous year, the Golden Bear winner Child's Pose, had sold around 118,000 tickets.

=== Critical response ===
Film critics were largely unimpressed. For Iulia Blaga of HotNews, Jacob's debut was not a run-of-the-mill MediaPro comedy, being more elaborate and more complex as a story and as a production, but it was just as artificial as Minte-mă frumos or S-a furat mireasa had been. She noted the budget that had paid for locations, night and underwater shooting and a difficult stunt, and a script by four writers, broader and with more subplots than usual, and she considered Răzvan Vasilescu's Nea Ceaușu the most likeable and most substantial character. What she held against the film was its lack of naturalness: the three heroines struck her as unconvincing, with a vitality that was badly calibrated, the film loses its audience before the halfway mark, and the cameos by Pro TV celebrities make it look like a company celebration. Her conclusion was that the film has "too much of the MediaPro recipe" to establish its author as a new voice, although Jacob seems to know her craft, and that it could still become a box office success.

Ionuț Mareș, in Ziarul Metropolis, gave it one star out of five and compared it to a loud Facebook post that wants to be funny and begs for likes. The three graduates seemed to him like aliens dropped by chance into the Romania of 2014, with behaviour borrowed from the Hollywood mythology of adolescence, and the conflicts facile and dramatically unsupported; the only inspired gags, in his view, came from Nea Ceaușu's communist paraphernalia and from Vasilescu's performance, along with the caricatured touches given to the parents and to the policeman played by Florin Călinescu. The bright, colourful photography, like a photo carefully worked over in Photoshop, he wrote, "renders a world made of plastic".

Writing for Cineuropa after seeing the film at Transilvania, Martin Kudláč placed it in the niche of teen comedies with a dash of coming-of-age story and generational conflict, the kind of summer comedy that the wider public, at least, considers perfect. He put the 123-minute running time down to the large number of characters and the three credited screenwriters, and found that the glossy photography, which imitates the look of MTV, and the ridiculing of parents and authorities were aimed at a young audience. A reviewer for the film website Next Projection, also covering the festival, found the result somewhat confused, with too much going on and a tone that lurches from heart-warming scenes to drunk driving and malice, and thought the film at least twenty minutes too long, while praising the cast, Vasilescu in particular, and Jacob's eye for the camera: there was, in this view, "an impressive film hidden within the baggy running time". Jacob answered such reservations indirectly in her statements during the run, insisting that she had made the film with the public and its appetite for Romanian comedy in mind, and that the film's results showed a need for comedies and for entertainment.

=== Accolades ===
At the ninth edition of the Gopo Awards, Selfie received four nominations: best debut film (Cristina Jacob), best actress in a leading role (Crina Semciuc, for Yasmine), best actor in a supporting role (Răzvan Vasilescu, for Nea Ceaușu) and best actress in a supporting role (Alina Chivulescu, for Cecilia). The organisers announced from the outset that the Audience Award, given to the Romanian film with the biggest box office of 2014, would go to it, on the strength of its 102,026 admissions and 1,147,487 lei in takings. At the ceremony on 30 March 2015 at the National Theatre Bucharest the film took that award but none of the four it had been nominated for; the debut trophy went to Vlad Petri's documentary Where Are You, Bucharest?.

A few months earlier, at the Best Film Fest gala of January 2015, organised by the Fabrica de Evenimente association with the support of the CNC and in partnership with the Romanian Filmmakers' Union and the distributors, where film journalists and critics voted on the films of the year, Selfie had received the trophy for the Romanian film with the most admissions of 2014. Abroad, the film won the top prize at the Broad Humor Film Festival in Los Angeles in September 2014 and three awards at the Southampton International Film Festival in October 2014, for best film, best editing and best actress in a leading role.

Award	Date of ceremony	Category	Recipient(s)	Result	Ref.
Broad Humor Film Festival	5–7 September 2014	Best Feature	Selfie	Won	
Southampton International Film Festival	19 October 2014	Best Film	Selfie	Won	
Southampton International Film Festival	19 October 2014	Best Editing	Selfie (Ovidiu Văcaru)	Won	
Southampton International Film Festival	19 October 2014	Best Actress in a Leading Role	Crina Semciuc	Won	
Southampton International Film Festival	19 October 2014	Best Director	Cristina Jacob	Nominated	
Southampton International Film Festival	19 October 2014	Best Screenplay	Cristina Jacob, Maria Spirache, Alexandru Molico, Geo Caraman	Nominated	
Southampton International Film Festival	19 October 2014	Best Supporting Role	Bogdan Cotleț	Nominated	
Best Film Fest	January 2015	Romanian film with the most admissions in 2014	Selfie	Won	
Gopo Awards	30 March 2015	Audience Award	Selfie	Won	
Gopo Awards	30 March 2015	Best Debut Film	Cristina Jacob	Nominated	
Gopo Awards	30 March 2015	Best Actress in a Leading Role	Crina Semciuc	Nominated	
Gopo Awards	30 March 2015	Best Actor in a Supporting Role	Răzvan Vasilescu	Nominated	
Gopo Awards	30 March 2015	Best Actress in a Supporting Role	Alina Chivulescu	Nominated	

== Sequel ==
Jacob said at the time of the premiere that she was already working on a sequel. The project, initially titled #Selfie 2: Cum să te măriți în trei zile (How to Get Married in Three Days), received a credit of 1,190,000 lei from the CNC in October 2014, was shot between 30 March and 7 May 2015 in 41 locations in Bucharest and Ilfov County, with an announced budget of €900,000, and reached cinemas on 16 September 2016 as Selfie 69, produced and distributed by Zazu Film, with the same six leads joined by Maia Morgenstern, Dorina Chiriac and Marian Râlea. The sequel outdid the original: 25,121 admissions on its opening weekend, a record for a Romanian film at the time and about double the first film's opening, and 133,744 admissions in the CNC's records, or 150,536 according to Cinemagia.
