= Love Is a Story =

2015 Romanian film about two artists who fall in love

Love is a Story
- Directed by: Cristina Jacob
- Screenplay by: Dan Chiriac; Cristina Jacob
- Produced by: Misu Predescu
- Starring: Dragos Bucur; Raluca Aprodu; Ducu Darie
- Cinematography: Viorel Sergovici
- Edited by: Catalin Cristutiu; Ovidiu Vacaru
- Music by: Hahaha Production
- Production company: Media Pro Entertainment
- Distributed by: Zazu Film
- Release date: 27 November 2015 (Romania)
- Running time: 97 minutes
- Country: Romania
- Language: Romanian

Love is a Story (2015) is a Romanian feature film, directed by Cristina Jacob. The film is about two young artists who begin their love story during the winter holidays, in an old and charming city of Transylvania.

== Plot ==
Sebastian and Aprilia start a beautiful love journey. Sebastian is a violin singer and earns his living through performances in various parts of the city or through a few public shows. Aprilia is an aspiring actress who, after breaking up with an influential director, finds it increasingly difficult to develop her career. The two meet by chance, so that later they become a couple. Their love story is tried by poverty and frustration. It is hard for both of them to face their situation and their relationship will be threatened by several obstacles.

== Cast ==
- Vlad Zamfirescu — Robert
- Maria Croitoru — Little girl 1
- Raluca Eftimie — Scripta
- Ducu Darie — Paul
- Ina Georgiana Tudor — Little girl 2
- Gabriela Popescu — House tendant
- Irina Petrescu — Paul's mother
- Tudor Roșu — Little boy
- Oltin Hurezeanu — Actor
- Mirela Oprișor — Irina
- Ionuț Bora — Ducu
- Mimi Brănescu — Virgil
- Patricia Poslusnic — Clara
- Raluca Aprodu — Aprilia
- Dragoș Bucur — Sebastian
- Diana Stancu — Make-up girl
- Adrian Hostiuc — Nicky

== Casting ==
A series of castings were conducted throughout Romania for 6 months. According to Cristina Jacob, the main challenge when filming Love is a story was to find the right two people that could create together a credible love story.

The first actor chosen was Raluca Aprodu, known for her career in theatre and Romanian television. About the main female role, Jacob mentioned that she was looking for a beautiful, talented actress that would be capable to bring together both emotion and strength.

The casting for Sebastian's character was one of the main challenges: "The problem was not that I couldn't find a good actor. The problem was that I couldn't find an actor who would match Raluca's height, her physiognomy and her attitude. I found Dragoș Bucur… I was convinced that without him I can't make the film", says Cristina Jacob.

== Production ==
The screenplay is written by Cristina Jacob and Dan Chiriac. The image belongs to Viorel Sergovici, the scenography is signed by Calin Papura and the costumes by Doina Levintza. The editing was done by Ovidiu Vacaru and Catalin Cristutiu. The original music belongs to HaHaHa Production. The sound was done by Dragos Stanomir, and the mix by Cristinel Sirli (Creative Sound). Love is a story was produced by MediaPro Entertainment and distributed by Zazu Film. In Romania, the feature film was released in November 2015.

== Filming ==
The filming lasted 21 days, and the team had to endure daily -20 degrees Celsius and a lot of snow, whether it fell from the sky or artificially created. The film producer, Misu Predescu, mentioned during an interview that they needed artificial snow to be brought on the set daily. It didn't snow during the filming days, although it was very cold outside.

The protagonists had to develop new skills in order to interpret the roles as good as possible. Dragoș Bucur took violin lessons. The scenes in which he plays this instrument seemed to him the most difficult: "I found that I like it a lot more than any classical music instrument", says the actor. About his role, Dragoș Bucur believes that "he is the type of character you play once in a lifetime".

== Music ==
Love is a story has 9 songs on the soundtrack, signed by 5 members of HaHaHa Production and composed specifically for the film. The song I wish, from the final credits, was previously composed by Smiley. For the instrumental part, the team worked with well known violinists of Romania.

One of the iconic songs of the soundtrack is My present for you. The song was composed by Serban Cazan, Ioana Sihota and Marius Pop. The original video contains footage from the movie. "We are very happy that, once again, Cristina gave us the opportunity to make music for a film of hers, this time of a different bill than #Selfie. For a long time we wanted to make music for the film, to dress the images musically”, said Smiley, who was in his second collaboration with the director Cristina Jacob.

== Release ==
Love is a story participated at the Mons International Film Festival. The film was also screened at the Montreal International Film Festival and at the 20th edition of "Portobello International Film Festival". On October 24, the film was released in Miami.
