= Cristina Jacob =

Romanian film director and screenwriter (born 1989)

Cristina Jacob (born 27 March 1989) is a Romanian film director and screenwriter. She has directed five feature films: The Perfect Escape (2022), Oh, Ramona! (2019), Selfie69 (2016), Love Is a Story (2015), and #Selfie (2014). Before that, Jacob directed In Godfather's movie (2012), a medium-length film, The Dowry (2011), a short film, and Mircea Veroiu (2010), a documentary.

== Career ==
Jacob graduated London Film School in 2012. She developed her style by studying works of David Fincher, Guy Ritchie, Christopher Nolan, Martin Scorsese, Darren Aronofsky and Pedro Almodóvar. Jacob stated that during her Master studies at the London Film School, she developed her skills through all the main departments of a film: production, writing, camera etc. After graduation, she chose film directing. According to Jacob, the film is the instrument used by an artist to awaken public consciousness. In her most recent movies, she preferred to express her art through comedy.

For her work as a film director, Jacob has received numerous awards at several international film festivals including Cannes Film Festival, Montreal World Film Festival, Dakino International Film Festival, Beloved International Film Festival, Ruby Mountain Film Festival USA, Eugene International Film Festival in the USA (2012), Ojai Film Festival (2012), Transilvania International Film Festival (2012), Southampton International Film Festival (2014) and Broad Humour Film Festival (2014).

About the process of directing a film, Jacob spoke on the difficulty of finding the right actors for certain roles and with the editing process that included analyzing the film frame by frame.

Jacob also contributes during the writing process of each script. About the experience of writing, she mentioned that usually, from the main idea of a story to the final draft, she and her team worked for more than 5 months and wrote more than 20 drafts. "Maybe for this reason, I always develop several scenarios in parallel, with different teams", said Jacob in a 2019 interview.

In 2012, Jacob founded the Romanian Screenwriters Association (ASCER). According to her, the association was created to ease the process of finding creative heads when producing films and put together both directors and scriptwriters.

== Filmography ==
Directed features
Year	Title	Theatrical Distributor	International Distributor
2012	In Godfather's Movie	MediaPro Distribution	MUBI
2014	#Selfie	Zazu Film	Netflix
2015	Love is a story	Zazu Film	Netflix
2016	Selfie 69	Zazu Film	Netflix
2019	Oh, Ramona!	Jacob Brothers	Netflix
2022	The Perfect Escape	Jacob Brothers	
