= List of Romanian films =

A list of the most notable films produced in the Cinema of Romania ordered by year of release. For an A-Z list of articles on Romanian films see Category:Romanian films.

== 1910s ==
Title	Director	Cast	Genre	Notes
1911
Amor fatal	Grigore Brezeanu	Lucia Sturdza-Bulandra, Tony Bulandra		
1912
Independența României	Aristide Demetriade			
Înșir'te mărgărite	Aristide Demetriade, Grigore Brezeanu	Aristide Demetriade, Ghita Bateria	Fantasy	Released 2 February 1912
1913
Detectivul	Constantin Radovici, Marioara Voiculescu	Constantin Radovici, Marioara Voiculescu		
Cetatea Neamțului	Emil Gârleanu	Remus Comăneanu, Coco Demetrescu		
1914
Dragoste la mănăstire	G. Georgescu	Tony Bulandra, Bebe Stănescu, Marioara Voiculescu		English: Love at the Monastery

== 1920s ==
Title	Director	Cast	Genre	Notes
1924
Păcat	Jean Mihail		Drama	
1925
Manasse	Jean Mihail			
Năbădăile Cleopatrei	Ion Șahighian	Charlotte Brodier, Ion Finteșteanu	Drama	
Legenda celor două cruci	Gheorghe Popescu	Tuchi Eremia, Alexandru Giugaru	Drama	
1926
Cererea în căsătorie	Jean Mihail	Alexandru Giugaru		
1927
Lia	Jean Mihail	Ion Armășescu, George Carussy, Aurel Costescu-Duca, Lilly Flohr	Drama	
1929
Povara	Jean Mihail	Elvira Godeanu	Drama	

== 1930s ==
Title	Director	Cast	Genre	Notes
1931
Aur	Jean Mihail			

== 1940s ==
Title	Director	Cast	Genre	Notes
1946
Floarea reginei	Paul Călinescu	Ioana Călinescu, Ileana Niculescu, Traian Vrajbă		English: The Queen's Flower. Entered into the 1946 Cannes Film Festival

== 1950s ==
Title	Director	Cast	Genre	Notes
1955
Moara cu noroc	Victor Iliu	Constantin Codrescu, Geo Barton, Ioana Bulcă, Colea Răutu	Drama	English: The Mill of Good Luck. Entered into the 1957 Cannes Film Festival
1956
Afacerea Protar	Haralambie Boroș	Radu Beligan, Jenică Constantinescu		Entered into the 1956 Cannes Film Festival
1958
Ciulinii Bărăganului	Louis Daquin	Florin Piersic, Nuța Chirlea, Ana Vlădescu	Drama	English: The Thistles of the Bărăgan. Entered in the 1958 Cannes Film Festival
The Ball	Andrei Blaier, Sinișa Ivetici	Lazăr Vrabie	Drama	Entered into the 1st Moscow International Film Festival
1959
Telegrame	Aurel Miheleș, Gheorghe Naghi	Grigore Vasiliu-Birlic, Costache Antoniu, Jules Cazaban	Comedy	Entered into the 1960 Cannes Film Festival

== 1960s ==
Title	Director	Cast	Genre	Notes
1960
1961
Darclee	Mihai Iacob	Silvia Popovici, Victor Rebengiuc		Entered into the 1961 Cannes Film Festival
Thirst	Mircea Drăgan, Mihai Iacob	Mircea Balaban, Ion Besoiu		Entered into the 2nd Moscow International Film Festival
1962
A Bomb Was Stolen	Ion Popescu-Gopo	Iurie Darie, Liliana Tomescu, Haralambie Boroș		Entered into the 1962 Cannes Film Festival
Lupeni 29	Mircea Drăgan	Lica Gheorghiu, Colea Răutu		Entered into the 3rd Moscow International Film Festival
Tudor	Lucian Bratu	Emanoil Petruț (Tudor Vladimirescu), George Vraca, Alexandru Giugaru	Historical biography	Black and white. The life of the 1820s Wallachian leader Tudor Vladimirescu.
1963
Codine	Henri Colpi	Alexandru Virgil Platon, Françoise Brion, Nelly Borgeaud, Germaine Kerjean		Entered into the 1963 Cannes Film Festival
1964
1965
Forest of the Hanged	Liviu Ciulei	Victor Rebengiuc, Anna Széles	Drama	Won the Best Director Award at the 1965 Cannes Film Festival
Răscoala	Mircea Mureșan	Matei Alexandru, Ion Besoiu		Won the Best First Work at the 1966 Cannes Film Festival
The White Moor	Ion Popescu-Gopo	Florin Piersic, Emil Botta, Fory Etterle, Chris Avram		Entered into the 4th Moscow International Film Festival
1966
Sunday at Six	Lucian Pintilie	Irina Petrescu, Dan Nuțu, Graziela Albini, Eugenia Popovici, Constantin Cojocaru		Entered into the Mar del Plata International Film Festival
1967
The 25th Hour	Henri Verneuil	Anthony Quinn, Virna Lisi, Grégoire Aslan		International co-production
Dacii	Sergiu Nicolaescu	Amza Pellea, Pierre Brice, Marie-José Nat, Georges Marchal, Mircea Albulescu, Sergiu Nicolaescu		Entered into the 5th Moscow International Film Festival
The Subterranean	Virgil Calotescu	Leopoldina Bălănuță		Entered into the 5th Moscow International Film Festival
1968
The Last of the Mohicans	Sergiu Nicolaescu	Hellmut Lange		
The Reenactment	Lucian Pintilie	George Constantin, Emil Botta, George Mihăiță, Vladimir Gaitan	Comedy drama	
1969
A Woman for a Season	Gheorghe Vitanidis	Iurie Darie, Irina Petrescu, Ioana Bulcă		Entered into the 6th Moscow International Film Festival

== 1970s ==
Title	Director	Cast	Genre	Notes
1970
Mihai Viteazul	Sergiu Nicolaescu	Amza Pellea, Ion Besoiu, Olga Tudorache, Sergiu Nicolaescu, Ilarion Ciobanu, Mircea Albulescu, Florin Piersic, Ioana Bulcă	Biographical	Entered into the 7th Moscow International Film Festival
Sick Animals	Nicolae Breban	Mircea Albulescu, Ion Dichiseanu		Entered into the 1971 Cannes Film Festival
Songs of the Sea	Francisc Munteanu	Dan Spătaru, Natalya Fateyeva, Ion Dichiseanu, Ștefan Bănică	Musical	
1972
Veronica	Elisabeta Bostan	Lulu Mihăescu, Margareta Pîslaru, Dem Rădulescu		
Cu mâinile curate	Sergiu Nicolaescu			
1973
Explosion	Mircea Drăgan			Entered into the 8th Moscow International Film Festival
Veronica se întoarce	Elisabeta Bostan			
Ultimul cartuș	Sergiu Nicolaescu			
1975
The Actor and the Savages	Manole Marcus			Entered into the 9th Moscow International Film Festival
1976
The Doom	Sergiu Nicolaescu			Entered into the 10th Moscow International Film Festival
The Punishment	Sergiu Nicolaescu	Amza Pellea, Ioana Pavelescu	Drama	
1977
Ma-ma	Elisabeta Bostan		Musical	
1978
The Prophet, the Gold and the Transylvanians	Dan Pița		Red Western	
1979
The Actress, the Dollars and the Transylvanians	Mircea Veroiu		Red Western	
Mihail, câine de circ	Sergiu Nicolaescu	Karl Michael Vogler	Adventure	
The Moment	Gheorghe Vitanidis			Entered into the 11th Moscow International Film Festival
Uncle Marin, the Billionaire	Sergiu Nicolaescu			
Vlad Țepeș	Doru Năstase	Ștefan Sileanu, Ernest Maftei	Historical	

== 1980s ==
Title	Director	Cast	Genre	Notes
1980
A Girl's Tears	Iosif Demian			Screened at the 1982 Cannes Film Festival
1981
Carnival Scenes	Lucian Pintilie			
The Oil, the Baby and the Transylvanians	Dan Pița		Red Western	
The Pale Light of Sorrow	Iulian Mihu			Entered into the 12th Moscow International Film Festival
1982
Glissando	Mircea Daneliuc			
1983
Return from Hell	Nicolae Mărgineanu			Entered into the 13th Moscow International Film Festival
1984
Life in the Romanian Danube Delta (Sosesc păsările călătoare)	Geo Saizescu	Emil Hossu, Tora Vasilescu, Rodica Muresan, Octavian Cotescu, Stefan Mihailescu-Braila, Sebastian Papaiani, Rodica Popescu Bitanescu, Ovidiu Iuliu Moldovan		
1985
Pas în doi	Dan Pița			Entered into the 36th Berlin International Film Festival
The Ring	Sergiu Nicolaescu			Entered into the 14th Moscow International Film Festival
1987
Pădureanca (The Forest Maiden)	Nicolae Mărgineanu	Victor Rebengiuc, Adrian Pintea, Manuela Harabor	Drama, romance	
1989
The Last Ball in November	Dan Pița			

== 1990s ==
Title	Director	Cast	Genre	Notes
1992
The Oak	Lucian Pintilie			Screened at the 1992 Cannes Film Festival
1993
Oglinda	Sergiu Nicolaescu		Drama	
The Conjugal Bed	Mircea Daneliuc			Entered into the 43rd Berlin International Film Festival
1994
An Unforgettable Summer	Lucian Pintilie			Entered into the 1994 Cannes Film Festival
Pepe & Fifi	Dan Pița			
1995
The Snails' Senator	Mircea Daneliuc			Entered into the 1995 Cannes Film Festival
State of Things	Stere Gulea			
1996
Eu Adam	Dan Pița			
Semne în pustiu	Nicolas Masson			
Too Late	Lucian Pintilie			Entered into the 1996 Cannes Film Festival
1997
The Man of the Day	Dan Pița			
Nekro	Nicolas Masson		Thriller	
1999
The Famous Paparazzo	Nicolae Mărgineanu			Entered into the 22nd Moscow International Film Festival

== 2000s ==
Title	Director	Cast	Genre	Notes
2001
War in the Kitchen	Marius Barna			
Stuff and Dough	Cristi Puiu		Drama	The first feature by Cristi Puiu, who went on to make The Death of Mr. Lazarescu, Stuff and Dough is a youthful road film.
2002
Filantropica	Nae Caranfil		Comedy	
Occident	Cristian Mungiu	Alexandru Papadopol as Luci	Comedy	Relationships in the Romanian spiritual crisis.
2003
Niki and Flo	Lucian Pintilie		Drama	The relationship between two neighboring in-laws.
2004
Marele jaf comunist			Documentary	About the Ioanid Gang
2005
The Death of Mr. Lazarescu	Cristi Puiu	Ioan Fiscuteanu as Dante Lăzărescu	Drama	The odyssey of an ill retired man, screened at Cannes.
Femeia visurilor	Dan Pița		Drama	
Ryna	Ruxandra Zenide	Doroteea Petre as Ryna		A teenager in the Danube Delta.
Second Hand	Dan Pița			
Tertium non-datur	Lucian Pintilie		Medium length	Located during the Second World War, the dialogue is in French, Romanian and German.
2006
12:08 East of Bucharest	Corneliu Porumboiu		Comedy	About the actuality of the Romanian Revolution.
Love Sick	Tudor Giurgiu		Drama	Lesbian teenage drama.
The Paper Will Be Blue	Radu Muntean		Drama	The first night of the revolution.
The Way I Spent the End of the World	Cătălin Mitulescu	Doroteea Petre		The last year of the dictatorship as seen by a teenager and her smaller brother. Screened at Cannes
2007
4 Months, 3 Weeks and 2 Days	Cristian Mungiu			Abortion in Communist Romania, won the Palme d'Or at Cannes
California Dreamin'	Cristian Nemescu			American soldiers meet Romanian villagers.
The Rest is Silence	Nae Caranfil			The making of one of the first Romanian films in 1911
2008
Silent Wedding	Horațiu Mălăele			
Elevator	George Dorobanțu	Cristi Petrescu, Iulia Verdeș	Drama / Comedy	Low-budget independent film.
2009
Eve	Adrian Popovici	Vanessa Redgrave, Michael Ironside	Drama	
Tales from the Golden Age	Cristian Mungiu			Un Certain Regard section at Cannes
Police, Adjective	Corneliu Porumboiu			Un Certain Regard section at Cannes
My Beautiful Dacia	Stefan Constantinescu, Julio Soto Gurpide		Documentary / Humor	Dacia, a simple and discreet automobile, but also a mirror of Romanian society
The Happiest Girl in the World	Radu Jude			

== 2010s ==
Title	Director	Cast	Genre	Notes
2010
The Autobiography of Nicolae Ceaușescu	Andrei Ujică			Shown in the Hors Competition section at Cannes
Aurora	Cristi Puiu			Entered into the Un Certain Regard section at Cannes
If I Want to Whistle, I Whistle	Florin Șerban			Entered into the 60th Berlin International Film Festival
Tuesday, After Christmas	Radu Muntean			Entered into the Un Certain Regard section at Cannes
Morgen	Marian Crișan			
Portrait of the Fighter as a Young Man	Constantin Popescu, Jr.			
2011
Loverboy	Cătălin Mitulescu			Entered into the Un Certain Regard section at the 2011 Cannes Film Festival
2012
Beyond the Hills	Cristian Mungiu			Entered into the main competition and won the awards for Best Screenplay and Best Actress at the 2012 Cannes Film Festival.
2013
Child's Pose	Călin Peter Netzer	Luminița Gheorghiu		Won the Golden Bear for Best Film at 63rd Berlin International Film Festival
Sunt o babă comunistă	Stere Gulea	Luminița Gheorghiu, Marian Râlea, Ana Ularu		
The Japanese Dog	Tudor Cristian Jurgiu			
Roxanne	Valentin Hotea	Ingrid Bisu, Cristian Bota	Drama, Family	
When Evening Falls on Bucharest or Metabolism	Corneliu Porumboiu	Bogdan Dumitrache, Mihaela Sirbu	Drama	Nominated of the Golden Leopard at the 2013 Locarno Film Festival
2014
A Love Story, Lindenfeld	Radu Gabrea	Victor Rebengiuc, Victoria Cociaș	Drama	
The Second Game	Corneliu Porumboiu		Documentary, History, Sport	
Selfie	Cristina Jacob		Comedy	
2015
Aferim!	Radu Jude			Won the Silver Bear for Best Director at 65th Berlin International Film Festival
Be My Cat: A Film for Anne	Adrian Țofei	Adrian Țofei, Sonia Teodoriu, Florentina Hariton, Alexandra Stroe	Psychological Horror	Romania's first found footage horror movie, winner of Best Film at the 2015 A Night of Horror International Film Festival in Sydney and Best Actor for Adrian Țofei at the 2016 Nashville Film Festival
Box	Florin Șerban	Rafael Florea	Drama	Screened during the 2015 Toronto Film Festival.
Circle of Love	Ion Marinescu	Calina Epuran, Florian Ghimpu, Ana Udroiu and Silvian Valcu	multimedia show: live concert and movie	The film was made by director and cinematographer Mihai Georgiadi and the characters were played by actors Calina Epuran, Florian Ghimpu, Ana Udroiu, and Silvian Valcu. Artistic directing belongs to Florian Ghimpu and the concept and production of the entire show was made by Petre Marinescu.
One Floor Below	Radu Muntean		Crime, Drama	Screened during Un Certain Regard at the 2015 Cannes Film Festival. Selected for Contemporary World Cinema section at the 2015 Toronto International Film Festival.
The Treasure	Corneliu Porumboiu	Toma Cuzin		Awarded Prix Un Certain Talent at the 2015 Cannes Film Festival.
The World is Mine	Nicolae Constantin Tănase	Ana Maria Guran	Coming of age, Drama	
Why Me?	Tudor Giurgiu			
2016
Dogs	Bogdan Mirică	Dragoș Bucur, Vlad Ivanov, Gheorghe Visu		
Graduation	Cristian Mungiu	Adrian Titieni, Maria-Victoria Dragus	Drama	Entered into the Palme d'Or section and Mungiu was awarded Best Director at the 2016 Cannes Film Festival.
The Fixer	Adrian Sitaru			
Two Lottery Tickets	Paul Negoescu			
Scarred Hearts	Radu Jude		Comedy, Drama	
Selfie 69	Cristina Iacob			
Sieranevada	Cristi Puiu	Mimi Brănescu, Dana Dogaru, Sorin Medeleni, Ana Ciontea, Bogdan Dumitrache	Drama	Selected as the Romanian entry at the 89th Academy Awards Selected for Palme d'Or at the 2016 Cannes Film Festival. Awarded Best Film at Gopo Awards.
2017
Ana, mon amour	Călin Peter Netzer		Drama	Selected to compete for the Golden Bear at the 67th Berlin International Film Festival
Octav	Serge Ioan Celebidachi			
One Step Behind the Seraphim	Daniel Sandu	Stefan Iancu, Vlad Ivanov	Drama	
Soldiers, Story from Ferentari	Ivana Mladenovic	Dan Bursuc, Sorin Comis	Drama	Winner of the Sebastiane Award – Special Mention at the 2017 San Sebastian International Film Awards
The Dead Nation	Radu Jude		Documentary, History, War	Nominated for Best Film in the Grierson Award at the 2017 Locarno Film Festival
2018
I Do Not Care If We Go Down in History as Barbarians	Radu Jude	Ioana Iacob, Alex Bogdan	Drama	
Infinite Football	Corneliu Porumboiu		Documentary, Sport	
Several Conversations About a Very Tall Girl	Bogdan Theodor Olteanu		Drama	
Touch Me Not	Adina Pintilie	Laura Benson, Tómas Lemarquis	Drama	Awarded the Golden Bear at the 68th Berlin International Film Festival
2019
Collective	Alexander Nanau		Documentary	Nominated for two Oscars – Best Documentary and Best Foreign Feature Film at the 93rd Academy Awards. Winner of the Best Documentary Award at the 2020 European Film Awards.
La Gomera	Corneliu Porumboiu	Vlad Ivanov, Cartinel Marlon	Comedy, Crime, Drama	Selected to compete for the Palme d'Or at the 2019 Cannes Film Festival Selected as the Romanian entry for the 92nd Academy Awards.
Oh, Ramona	Cristina Jacob		Comedy	

== 2020s ==
Title	Director	Cast	Genre	Notes
2020
Acasă, My Home	Radu Ciorniciuc		Documentary	Cinematography Award for World Cinema – Documentary at the 2020 Sundance Film Festival Nominated for Best Documentary at the European Film Awards 2020.
Malmkrog	Cristi Puiu	Agathe Bosch, Ugo Broussot, Marina Palii	Drama, History	Screened at the Encounters section at the 70th Berlin International Film Festival where it won the prize for Best Director.
Poppy Field	Eugen Jebeleanu	Conard Mericoffer, Alexandru Potocean	Drama	
Uppercase Print	Radu Jude		Drama, History	
2021
Bad Luck Banging or Loony Porn	Radu Jude	Katie Pascariu, Claudia Ieremia, Olimpia Mălai	Comedy, Drama	Winner of the Golden Bear at the 71st Berlin International Film Festival
Întregalde	Radu Muntean	Maria Popistașu, Luca Sabin, Ilona Brezoianu, Alex Bogdan	Drama	
Snow, Tea and Love	Catalin Bugean	Alecsandra Timofte Revnic, Alex Velea, Alina Pușcău, Anca Dinicu, Andreas Petrescu, Angel Popescu, Carmen Tănase, Catalin Bugean, Cosmin Seleși, Cristian Iacob, Dan Negru, Dorian Popa, Dragos Dumitru, Florin Busuioc, Ioana Mihail Tiberiu, Iuliana Luciu, Levent Sali, Liviu Vârciu, Marin Barbu, Monica Anghel, Paula Chirilă, Pepe, Raluka, Sergiu Costache, Sorin Bontea	Science fiction, Comedy	
2022
Metronom	Alexandru Belc	Mara Bugarin, Servan Lazarovici, Vlad Ivanov, Mihai Călin, Andreea Bibiri, Alina Brezunțeanu, Mara Vicol.	Drama	
R.M.N.	Cristian Mungiu	Marin Grigore, Judith State, Macrina Bârlădeanu, Orsolya Moldován, Andrei Finți, Mark Blenyesi, Ovidiu Crișan	Drama	
Teambuilding	Alex Cotet, Matei Dima & Cosmin Nedelcu	Matei Dima, Cosmin Nedelcu, Anca Dinicu, Nicu Banea, Șerban Pavlu, Roxana Condurache, Cristi Pulhac, Monica Odagi, Sorina Stefanescu, Bobu Victoria, Vlad Ianus, Adrian Nicolae, Nuami Dinescu	Comedy	
2023
Do Not Expect Too Much from the End of the World	Radu Jude	Ilinca Manolache, Nina Hoss, Katia Pascariu, Sofia Nicolaescu, Uwe Boll	Comedy	
2025
Kontinental '25	Radu Jude	Eszter Tompa, Gabriel Spahiu	Comedy-drama	Premiere at the 75th Berlin International Film Festival on 19 February.

== See also ==
- List of Romanian submissions for the Academy Award for Best Foreign Language Film
- List of Romanian film and theatre directors
- Cinema of Romania
- Lists of films
- List of years in Romania
