= Cazaban =

Cazaban is a Romanian surname of French origin. Notable people with the surname include:

- Alexandru Cazaban, Romanian prose writer
- Jean Cazaban (1882-1980), French WWII general
- Jules Cazaban, Romanian playwright and director
- Theodor Cazaban, Romanian writer
