= Tetraserica rungbongensis =

Scientific classification
- Kingdom: Animalia
- Phylum: Arthropoda
- Class: Insecta
- Order: Coleoptera
- Suborder: Polyphaga
- Infraorder: Scarabaeiformia
- Family: Scarabaeidae
- Genus: Tetraserica
- Species: T. rungbongensis

Binomial name
- Tetraserica rungbongensis Ahrens, 2004

Species of beetle

Tetraserica rungbongensis is a species of beetle of the family Scarabaeidae. It is found in India (Sikkim).

== Description ==
Adults reach a length of about 7.4-7.7 mm. They have a medium reddish brown, oval body. The dorsal surface is mostly dull and glabrous, except for the lateral cilia and some setea on the head.

== Etymology ==
The species is named for its type locality, Rungbong Valley.
