= Anghelescu =

Anghelescu is a Romanian surname that may refer to

- Dan Anghelescu (born 1958), Romanian coach and football player
- Giulia Anghelescu (born 1984), Romanian pop/dance recording artist
- Marcel Anghelescu (1909–1977), Romanian stage and film actor
