= Schizonycha fartula =

Scientific classification
- Kingdom: Animalia
- Phylum: Arthropoda
- Clade: Pancrustacea
- Class: Insecta
- Order: Coleoptera
- Suborder: Polyphaga
- Infraorder: Scarabaeiformia
- Family: Scarabaeidae
- Genus: Schizonycha
- Species: S. fartula

Binomial name
- Schizonycha fartula Péringuey, 1904

Species of beetle

Schizonycha fartula is a species of beetle of the family Scarabaeidae. It is found in South Africa (Western Cape).

== Description ==
Adults reach a length of about 14–15 mm (0.55–0.59 in). They are ferruginous-red, or sometimes chestnut-brown, with the palpi and antennae testaceous and the tibiae piceous-red. The surface of the head is covered with nearly coalescing, sub-scabrose elongate punctures, a little less deep on the clypeus than on the frontal part. The pronotum has a fringe of setea on the outer margin, and the base is briefly pubescent. The surface is sprinkled with round punctures, somewhat distant from each other except along the anterior edge, and has a median impunctate transverse space. The scutellum is closely punctulate in the basal part, above the transverse impression, and with one puncture only on each side. The elytra are covered with closely set round punctures bearing each a most minute hair, and separated from each other by a space equal to their diameter. The pygidium has scattered, somewhat shallow round punctures which are more closely set in the anterior part.
