= A Lost Letter (film) =

- Directed by: Sică Alexandrescu; Victor Iliu
- Written by: Ion Luca Caragiale (1884 play)
- Cinematography: Andrei Feher
- Edited by: Aurelia Simionov
- Release date: 1953
- Running time: 135 minutes
- Country: Romania
- Language: Romanian

A Lost Letter (Romanian: O scrisoare pierdută) is a 1953 Romanian historical comedy film directed by Sică Alexandrescu and Victor Iliu. It is based on the 1884 play A Lost Letter by Ion Luca Caragiale.

== Plot ==
A compromising love letter that goes astray threatens to cause a scandal in a small provincial town in the late nineteenth century.

== Cast ==
- Marcel Anghelescu as Ghiță Pristanda
- Costache Antoniu as Un cetățean turmentat (a drunk citizen)
- Nicky Atanasiu as Ștefan Tipătescu
- Radu Beligan as Agamemnon Dandanache
- Ion Finteșteanu as Tache Farfuridi
- Alexandru Giugaru as Zaharia Trahanache
- Elvira Godeanu as Zoe Trahanache
- Ion Henter as Ionescu
- Ion Talianu as Nae Cațavencu
- Grigore Vasiliu-Birlic as Brânzovenescu

== Reception ==
The film is the directorial debut of Alexandrescu, a renowned theater director, who had staged the play at the Teatrului Naţional; Tudor Caranfil, noting various changes in the cast, praised the production.

The adaptation was judged of an "absolute fidelity" to the play.

== Bibliography ==
- Thomas J. Slater. Handbook of Soviet and East European films and filmmakers. Greenwood Press, 1992.
