= Theodor Cazaban =

Romanian anti-communist writer

Theodor Cazaban (2 April 1921 – 4 March 2016) was a Romanian anti-communist writer.

Born in Fălticeni, he graduated from the University of Bucharest with a degree in letters, and fled to France in 1947. While in Paris, he was a staff member of the anti-communist newspaper 'La Nation Roumaine' and contributed to the broadcasts of Radio Free Europe. In 1963 he published the novel Parages, in which he describes Communist persecutions of Romanian intellectuals, such as Mircea Eliade, Emil Cioran, Eugène Ionesco, and others.

Marilena Rotaru of the Romanian Television made a documentary movie in 2003 about Theodor Cazaban.

== Family ==
Theodor was the younger brother of the playwright, Jules Cazaban.

== Works ==
- Captiv în lumea liberă, Editura Echinox, Cluj, 2002. ISBN 973-8298-10-5
- Eseuri și cronici literare, Editura "Jurnalul literar", București, 2002. ISBN 973-9365-56-6, .
- Parages, Éditions Gallimard, Paris, 1963 (in French)
