= Telegrame =

1959 film

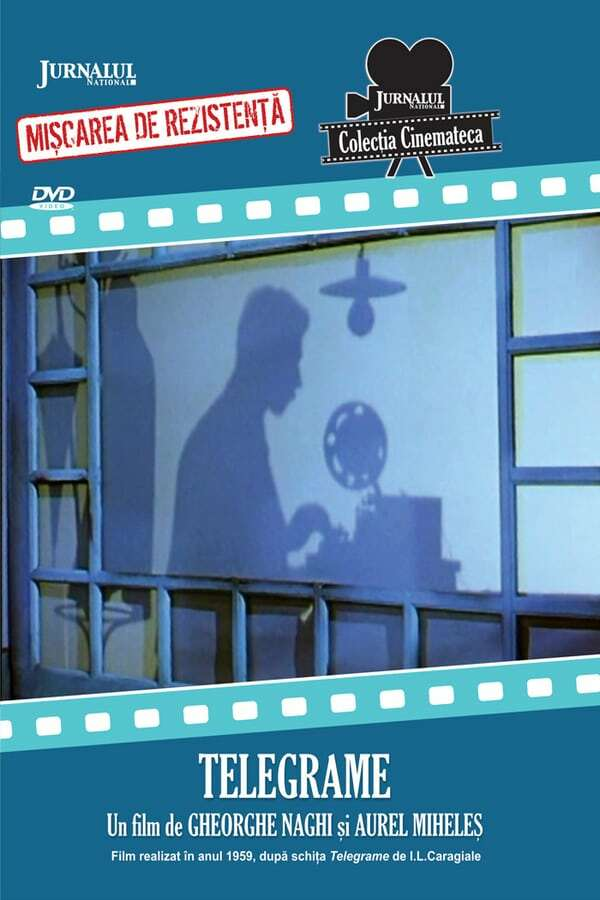
- Directed by: Aurel Miheleș; Gheorghe Naghi
- Written by: Ion Luca Caragiale; Mircea Ștefănescu
- Starring: Grigore Vasiliu Birlic; Costache Antoniu; Jules Cazaban; Marcel Anghelescu; Mircea Șeptilici
- Cinematography: Ion Cosma
- Release date: March 1, 1960
- Running time: 76 minutes
- Country: Romania
- Language: Romanian

Telegrame is a 1959 Romanian comedy film directed by Aurel Miheleș and Gheorghe Naghi and starring Grigore Vasiliu Birlic. The film, based on the eponymous sketch by Ion Luca Caragiale, premiered in Romania on 1 March 1960. It was entered into the 1960 Cannes Film Festival.

== Cast ==
- Coca Andronescu as the prosecutor's daughter
- Marcel Anghelescu as Popic
- Costache Antoniu as Antonache Pamfil
- Niki Atanasiu as Raul Grigorașcu
- Horia Căciulescu as the guard Zapcianu
- Jules Cazaban as Iordăchel Gudurău
- Ștefan Ciubotărașu as the owner of the café
- Remus Comăneanu as general Grigorașcu
- Radu Dunăreanu
- Fory Etterle as a Minister
- Mihai Fotino as the Minister of Interior
- Alexandru Giugaru as the County Court prosecutor
- Nineta Gusti as the Lady
- Alexandru Ionescu-Ghibericon as the bandmaster
- Ștefan Iordănescu-Bruno
- Alexandru D. Lungu as the sweeper
- George Mărutză
- Mihai Mereuță as the general's servant
- Nicolae Neamțu-Ottonel as Iorgu, the Prime Minister
- Draga Olteanu as a commenting wife
- Nucu Păunescu as a pool player
- Dem Rădulescu as another pool player
- Mircea Șeptilici as the Minister of Justice
- Horia Șerbănescu as Jenică
- Carmen Stănescu as Atenaisa Perjoiu
- Vasilica Tastaman as woman in love with Turturel
- Ovid Teodorescu as Albert Gudurău
- Florin Vasiliu as Mr. Turturel
- Grigore Vasiliu Birlic as Costăchel Gudurău
- Unknown yet as telegraph operator Crudela
