= Grigore Vasiliu Birlic =

Romanian actor and comedian (1905–1970)

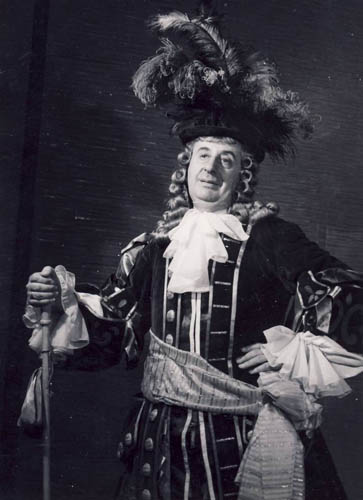
- Born: Grigore Vasiliu; 24 January 1905; Fălticeni, Suceava County, Kingdom of Romania
- Died: 14 February 1970 (aged 65); Bucharest, Socialist Republic of Romania
- Resting place: Bellu Cemetery, Bucharest
- Occupation: Actor
- Years active: 1934–1969
- Spouses: Angela Mateescu; Valeria Nanci

Grigore Vasiliu Birlic (Romanian pronunciation: [ɡriˈɡore vasiˈli.u birˈlik]; January 24, 1905 – February 14, 1970) was a Romanian actor who appeared on stage, television and in films. He was best known for comedic roles.

== Early life ==
Grigore Vasiliu was born on 24 January 1905 into the family of a small businessman on the "Pârâul Târgului" street in Fălticeni, in the Bukovina region of Romania. As a child he wanted to become a circus clown; however, his parents did not consider acting a serious job, and when he finished the "Nicu Gane" high school in Fălticeni in 1924, he was sent to study law at the University of Cernăuți.

== Early career ==
He started in the local theater where he was noticed by Dragoș Protopopescu, the theater director. He received his first role as a mute character in the comedic play "Musca spaniolă" ("The Spanish Fly") by Franz Arnold and Ernst Bach. He was hired at the National Theater in Cernăuți, and his next appearance was in Victor Ion Popa's "Amanetul" (The Pawn Shop) by Ludvig Holberg. Birlic, who struggled with a lisp, failed to get into the Dramatic Art Conservatory of Cernăuţi seven times before succeeding at the eighth. There, he was a student of Petre Sturdza and met Jules Cazaban as a fellow student.

== Top of the career ==
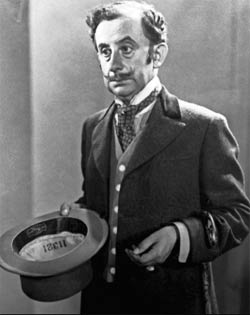

In 1933, director Aurel Maican brought him to Bucharest where he performed in plays such as "Vârcolacul"("The Werewolf), "Micul Weber" ("Little Weber") and "Prostul din baie"("The Idiot in the Bathroom"). Grigore Vasiliu was nicknamed Breloc ("Pendant") after playing in Ion Iancovescu's Corabia lui Noe ("Noah's Ark").

His big breakthrough was with Iancovescu's play Împăratul ("The Emperor") by Luigi Bonelli. Alongside him were Mania Antonova and N.N. Matei. Following this success, he played the main character in Tudor Mușatescu's adaptation of the play Birlic by Franz Arnold and Ernst Bach. The play was another success for the actor who became known as Grigore Vasiliu-Birlic due to the character he interpreted for a long time with great success.

Although he was appointed director of the theatre group Colorado, communist laws banned private theatre groups and he was fired. He returned to the National Theatre of Bucharest where the repertory was set by the Propaganda Department of the Romanian Communist Party.

His comeback was in 1953's Sică Alexandrescu's adaptation of Ion Luca Caragiale's play, O scrisoare pierdută ("A Lost Letter"), in which he initially portrayed Dandanache and then Brânzovenescu. Radu Beligan praised the play and described Birlic as "[a] genius of comedy, of the Romanian humor".

In 1956, Alexandrescu, Birlic, Alexandru Giugaru and George Calboreanu performed the play Bădăranii ("The Boors") by Carlo Goldoni at the Goldoni Festival in Venice. A storm erupted while the actors were on stage, yet the guests remained in the garden of Palazzo Grassi, entranced by Birlic's interpretation of Caciani.

== End of career ==
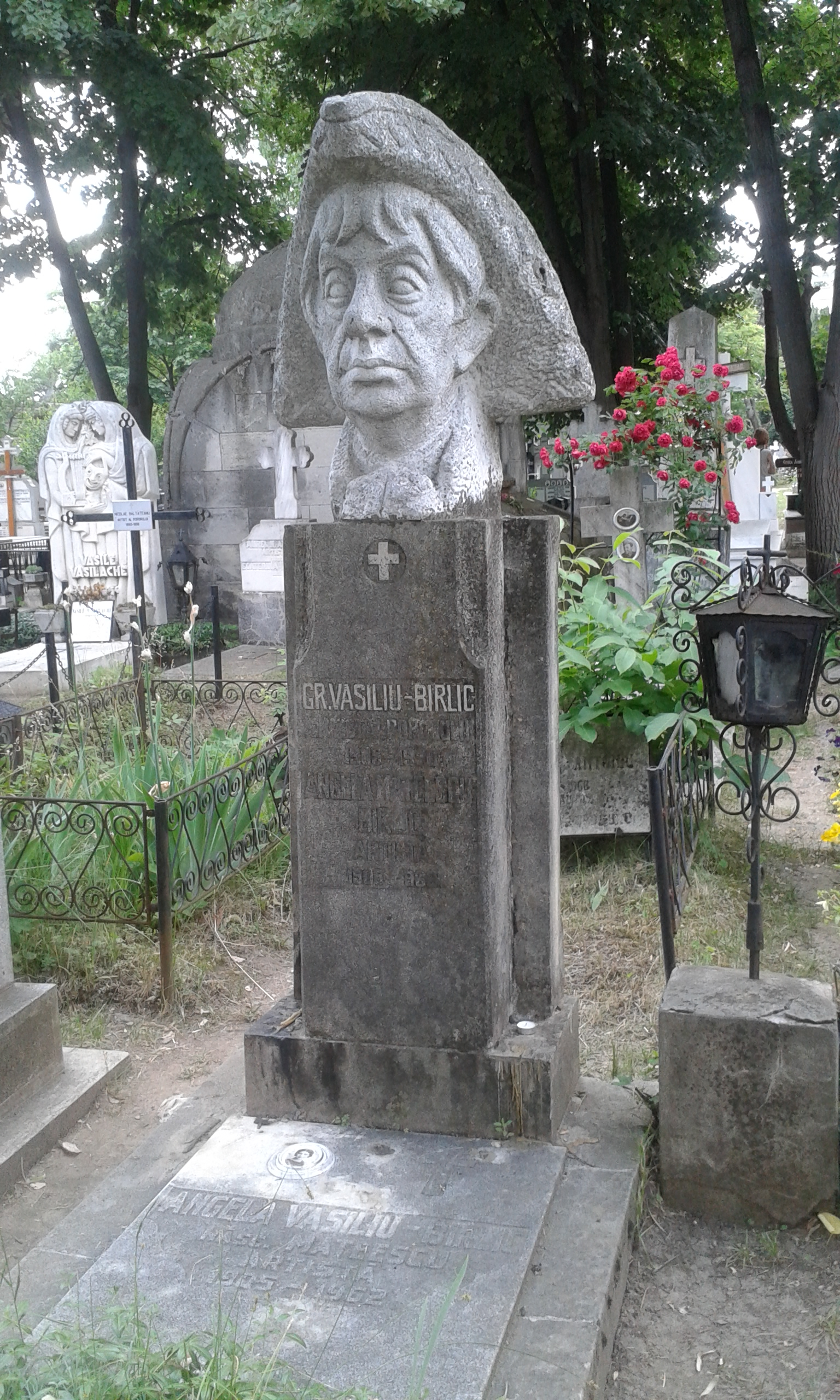
Grave of Birlic at Bellu Cemetery

After his return from Italy, Birlic continued acting in D-ale carnavalului (lit. "Carnival Stuff") and Conu Leonida față cu reacțiunea (lit. "Master Leonida Face To Face With Reactionism") by Caragiale, The Miser and Le Bourgeois gentilhomme by Molière, Yegor Bulychov by Maxim Gorki, The Government Inspector by Nikolai Gogol, Oameni care tac (lit. "People Who Don't Talk") by Alexandru Voitin, Krechinsky's Wedding by Aleksandr Sukhovo-Kobylin, and Mielul turbat (lit. "The Rabid Lamb") by Aurel Baranga.

In his entire career, Birlic portrayed 13 of Caragiale's characters. For Romanians, the face of Grigore Vasiliu-Birlic merges with the notion of a Caragiale character. Birlic himself said "As one of the actors who have played the most characters – 13 – from the work of our great dramatist, I recall Caragiale with affectionate gratitude for the theatrical successes that he occasioned me with. These roles represented to me in over 35 years of theatre, a great school of acting knowledge, characters of our drama masters. "

Sensing that his end was near, Birlic asked his manager, Gaby Michăilescu, to help him direct his last theatrical appearance. He chose to reenact the play that gave him his name, "Birlic". Actors who also played in Birlic's last appearance were Silvia Dumitrescu-Timică, Alexandru Giugaru, Petre Ștefănescu-Goangă, Nicolae Gărdescu, Vasilica Tastaman, and Ion Antonescu-Cărăbuș.

On 14 February 1970, Grigore Vasiliu-Birlic died at the age of 65 in Bucharest. He is buried at Bellu Cemetery in Bucharest.

== Film ==
In 1934, Birlic began in his film career with the movie Bing-Bang alongside Stroe and Vasilache, followed by Doamna de la etajul II ("The second floor lady") starring Birlic, Maud Mary, Mihai Popescu, and Mihai Fotino. During World War II, artistic activities in Romania were limited, but Birlic returned in 1951 in Jean Georgescu's Vizita ("The Visit"), an adaptation of Caragiale's sketch. Following this success, he was featured in O Scrisoare Pierdută, in Gheorghe Naghi and Aurel Micheles's Două lozuri ("Two Lottery Tickets"), and in Iancovescu's D-ale carnavalului ("The Carnival"). The three adaptations of Caragiale's work formed the highlight of Birlic's career.

== Filmography ==
| Year | Film | Role | Notes |
|---|---|---|---|
| 1935 | Bing-Bang | The Client | |
| 1937 | Doamna de la etajul II | Director in the Ministry | |
| 1951 | Viața Învinge | Mișu | |
| 1952 | Vizita | The guest | |
| 1952 | Lanțul Slăbiciunilor | | |
| 1953 | O Scrisoare Pierdută | Iordache Brînzovenescu | |
| 1955 | Directorul Nostru | Gh. Ciubuc | |
| 1957 | Două lozuri | Lefter Popescu | |
| 1957 | D'ale Carnavalului | Crăcănel | |
| 1959 | Telegrame | | |
| 1959 | Doi vecini | Attorney M. Theodorescu-Falciu | |
| 1959 | Băieţii Noştri | | |
| 1960 | Bădăranii | Caciano | |
| 1961 | Post restant | | |
| 1961 | Drum nou | | |
| 1961 | Aproape de Soare | Petre's father | |
| 1962 | Doi băieți ca pâinea caldă | | |
| 1963 | Lumina de iulie | | |
| 1964 | Pași spre lună | Mercur | |
| 1964 | Mofturi 1900 | | |
| 1965 | Titanic Vals | Spirache Necșulescu | |
| 1965 | The Lace Wars | | |
| 1966 | Steaua fără nume | Udrea, the music teacher | |
| 1966 | Corigența domnului Profesor | | |
