= Ion Talianu =

Romanian actor

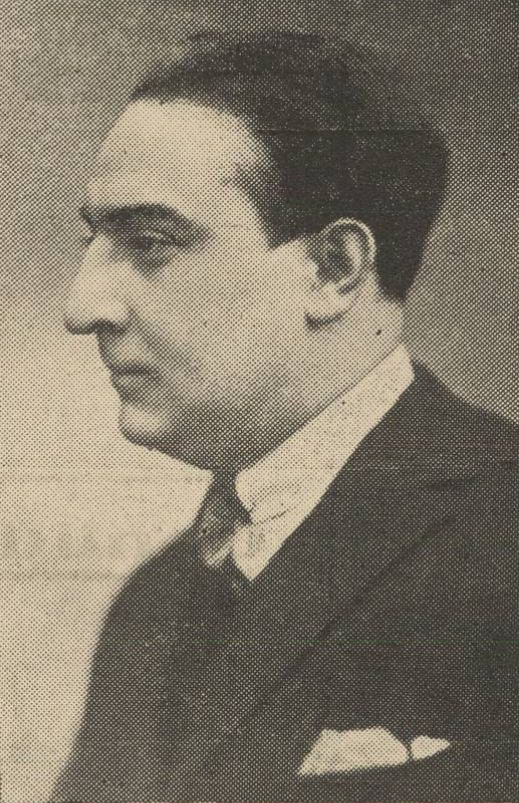
- Born: 3 March 1898; Targu Ocna, Romania
- Died: 21 April 1956; Bucharest, Romania
- Occupation: Actor

Ion Talianu (Romanian pronunciation: [iˈon taliˈanu]; 1898–1956) was a Romanian stage actor. He also appeared in six films.

== Filmography ==
- The Valley Resounds (1950)
- A Lost Letter (1953)
- Mitrea Cocor (1953)
- The Sun Rises (1954)
- Pe raspunderea mea (1956)
- The Protar Affair (1956)

== Bibliography ==
- Cristian Sandache. Literatura si propaganda in Romania lui Gheorghiu Dej. 2001.
