= The Valley Resounds =

1950 film

- Directed by: Paul Călinescu
- Written by: Mircea Ștefănescu
- Cinematography: Wilfried Ott
- Edited by: Lucia Anton
- Music by: Paul Constantinescu
- Release date: 22 August 1950
- Running time: 68 minutes
- Country: Romania
- Language: Romanian

The Valley Resounds (Romanian: Răsună valea) is a 1950 Romanian drama film directed by Paul Călinescu. Communist volunteers work to construct a new railway line.

The film's sets were designed by Stefan Norris.

== Cast ==
- Marcel Anghelescu
- Geo Barton
- Radu Beligan
- Bob Calinescu
- Angela Chiuaru
- Al Ionescu-Ghibericon
- Eugenia Popovici
- Horia Serbanescu
- Nicolae Sireteanu
- Ion Talianu
- Maria Voluntaru
- Livius Cecală

== Bibliography ==
- Liehm, Mira & Liehm, Antonín J. The Most Important Art: Eastern European Film After 1945. University of California Press, 1977.
