= Marcel Anghelescu =

Romanian actor

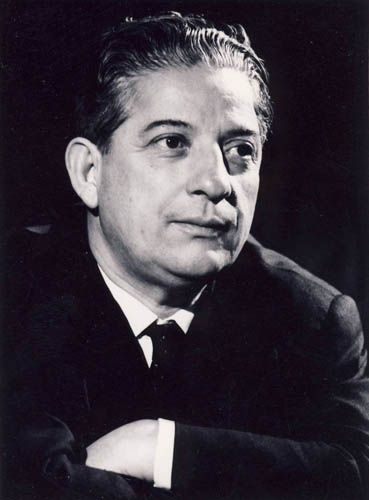
- Born: 3 November 1909; Craiova, Kingdom of Romania
- Died: 22 February 1977 (aged 67); Bucharest, Socialist Republic of Romania
- Occupation: Actor
- Years active: 1942-1977 (film)

Marcel Anghelescu (Romanian pronunciation: [marˈtʃel aŋɡeˈlesku]; 3 November 1909 – 22 February 1977) was a Romanian stage and film actor.

== Partial filmography ==
- Ziua cumpătării (1942)
- Squadriglia bianca (1944) - Nello
- The Valley Resounds (1950) - Ion
- Arendașul român (1952)
- Vizită (1952)
- Cu Marincea e ceva (1954) - Marinică Busuioc
- A Lost Letter (1954) - Ghiță Pristanda
- Popescu 10 în control (1955)
- Pe răspunderea mea (1956) - Șerban
- Stormy Bird (1957) - Steaga
- O mica întîmplare (1957)
- Două lozuri (1957) - Căpitanul Pandele
- Ciulinii Bărăganului (1957) - Ursu
- Avalanșa (1959) - Matei
- Telegrame (1960) - Popic
- Băieții noștri (1960) - Marian
- Furtuna (1960)
- Bădăranii (1960) - Maurizio
- Darclée (1960) - Ruggero Leoncavallo
- Post restant (1962) - Toma
- Omul de lângă tine (1962)
- Celebrul 702 (1962)
- Cinci oameni la drum (1962) - Dobre
- Partea ta de vină (1963) - Oniga
- Lumina de iulie (1963) - Pavel Serea
- Pași spre lună (1963) - Baronul de Münchhausen
- Mofturi 1900 (1964)
- Mona, l'étoile sans nom (1966) - Station Master
- Corigența domnului profesor (1966) - Andrei Mureșanu
- Castelanii (1967) - Mădăraș
- Aventuri la Marea Neagra (1972) - Generarul
- Ceața (1973)
- Cantemir (1973)
- Trei scrisori secrete (1974) - Foreman Bocancea
- Frații Jderi (1974) - Iohan Roşu
- Ștefan cel Mare - Vaslui 1475 (1975) - George Amirutzes, Royal Tutor
- Muschetarul român (1975) - Dragus
- Tufă de Veneția (1977)
- Războiul independenței (1977) - Nicolae Fleva
- Severino (1978) - (final film role)

== Bibliography ==
- Goble, Alan. The Complete Index to Literary Sources in Film. Walter de Gruyter, 1999.
