= The Protar Affair =

1956 film

- Directed by: Haralambie Boros
- Written by: Mihail Sebastian
- Starring: Radu Beligan
- Cinematography: Ion Cosma
- Release date: 1956
- Country: Romania
- Language: Romanian

The Protar Affair (Romanian: Afacerea Protar) is a 1956 Romanian comedy film directed by Haralambie Boros. It was entered into the 1956 Cannes Film Festival.

== Cast ==
- Radu Beligan - Prof. Andronic
- Jenica Constantinescu
- Ion Fintesteanu
- Ion Iancovescu
- Ion Lucian
- Constantin Ramadan
- Ion Talianu
- Florin Vasiliu
- Ioana Zlotescu
