= Fălticeni =

- Municipality
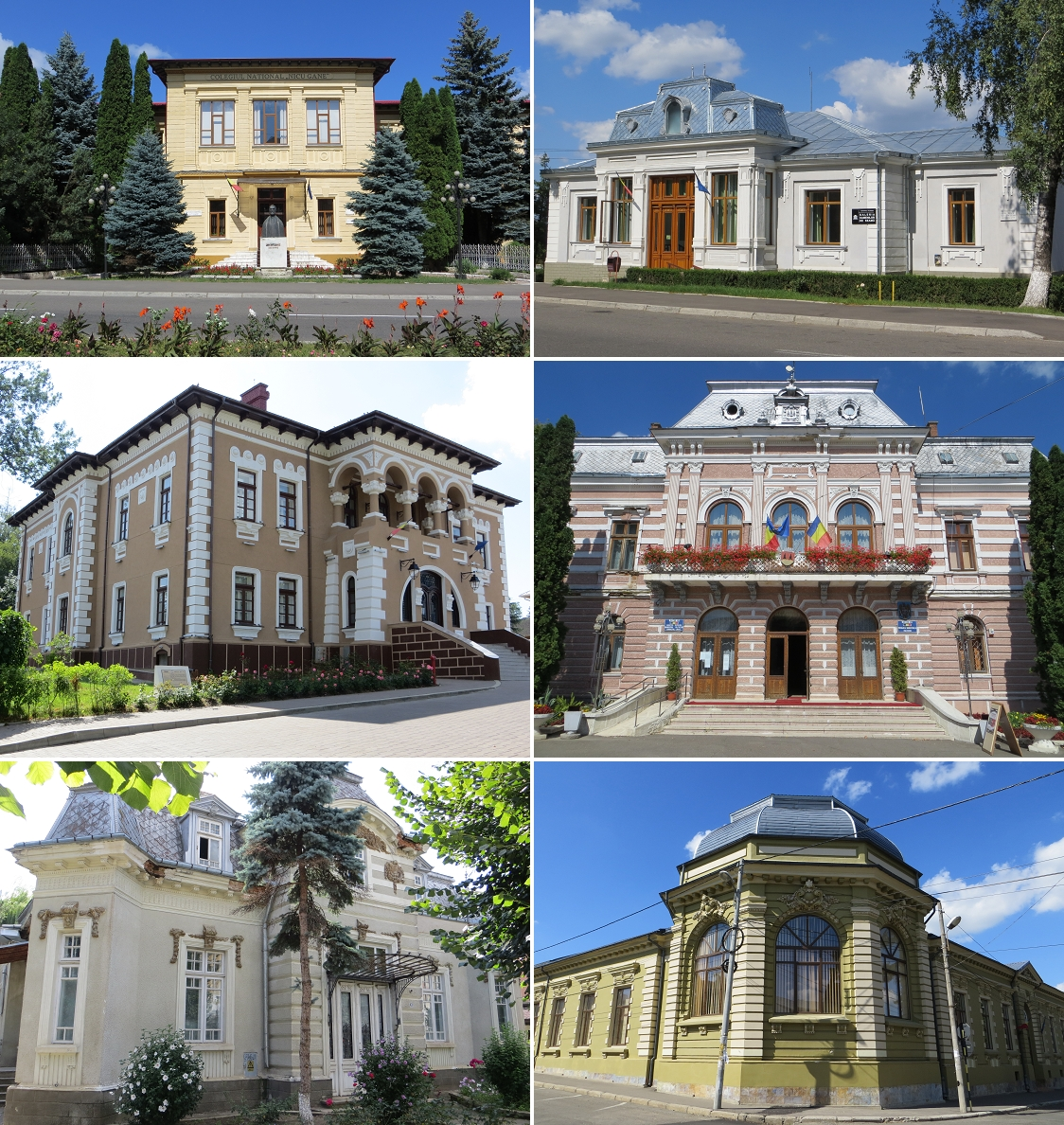
- From top-left, clockwise: Nicu Gane National College, House of Notable People, City Hall, Mihai Băcescu Water Museum, Children's House, Ion Irimescu Art Museum

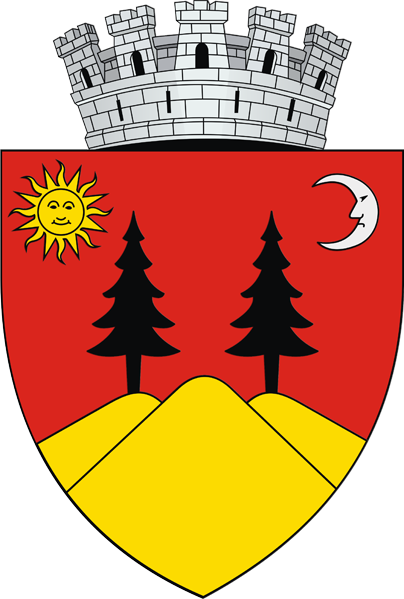
- Coat of arms

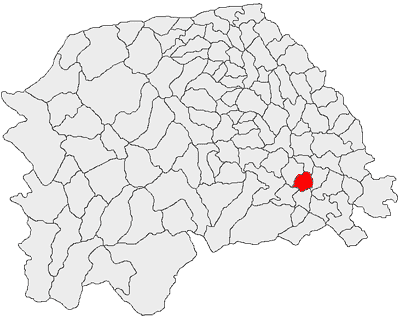
- Location in Suceava County

- Location in Romania
- Coordinates: 47°27′35″N 26°18′0″E
- Country: Romania
- County: Suceava

Government
  - Mayor (2024–2028): Gheorghe Cătălin Coman (PSD)
- Area: 28.76 km^{2} (11.10 sq mi)
- Elevation: 348 m (1,142 ft)
- Population (2021-12-01): 23,902
  - Density: 831.1/km^{2} (2,152/sq mi)
- Time zone: UTC+02:00 (EET)
  - Summer (DST): UTC+03:00 (EEST)
- Postal code: 725200
- Area code: (+40) 02 30
- Vehicle reg.: SV
- Website: www.falticeni.ro

Fălticeni (Romanian pronunciation: [fəltiˈt͡ʃenʲ]); (German: Foltischeni or Folticzeny; Hungarian: Falticsén; Hebrew: פלטיצ'ן Yiddish: פאלטישאן, romanized: Foltshen) is a town in Suceava County, northeastern Romania. It is situated in the historical region of Western Moldavia. According to the 2021 census, Fălticeni is the third largest urban settlement in the county. It was declared a municipality in 1995, along with two other cities in Suceava County: Rădăuți and Câmpulung Moldovenesc.

Fălticeni covers an area of 28.76 km^{2} (11.10 sq mi), of which 25% are orchards and lakes, and it administers two villages: Șoldănești and Țarna Mare. It was the capital of former Baia County (1929–1950). The town is known for the high number of Romanian writers, artists, and scientists who were born, lived, studied, or have created here.

== Geography ==
Fălticeni is located in the southern part of Suceava County, 25 km (16 mi) away from Suceava, the county seat. The European route E85 crosses the city. Fălticeni is connected to the Romanian national railway system, through Dolhasca train station (24 km away). The city of Roman is 80 km (50 mi) to the south, on the E85 road.

== Administration and local politics ==
=== Town council ===
The town's former local council had the following political composition, according to the results of the 2020 Romanian local elections:

Party	Seats	Current Council
Social Democratic Party (PSD)	13	
National Liberal Party (PNL)	4	
Save Romania Union (USR)	2	

The town's current local council has the following political composition, according to the results of the 2024 Romanian local elections:

Party	Seats	Current Council
Social Democratic Party (PSD)	13	
National Liberal Party (PNL)	2	
Alliance for the Union of Romanians (AUR)	2	
United Right Alliance (ADU)	2	

== History ==
The earliest written mention of the village Folticeni is from March 1490, and the second from March 1554, when Moldavian Prince Alexandru Lăpușneanu awarded the estate and the village bearing the aforesaid name to Moldovița Monastery.

Fălticeni was first mentioned as an urban settlement in August 1780 as Târgul Șoldănești (Șoldănești Market), after the name of a local boyar's estate, in a document issued by the chancellery of Prince Constantin Moruzi. In March 1826, an edict issued by Prince Ioan Sturdza changed the name of the town to Fălticeni.

Fălticeni was bombed by the Bolsheviks during World War I.

Before World War I, Fălticeni was the capital of the Romanian Old Kingdom’s Suceava County. After the Union of Bukovina with Romania and an administrative reform from 1925, Fălticeni became the capital of Baia County, remaining as such until 1950. Since the revival of counties in 1968, the city has been part of Suceava County.

In 1921 the Faltishan (Yiddish for Fălticeni) Hasidic dynasty was founded in Fălticeni, by Rabbi Eluzar Twersky, a scion of the Skver Hasidic sect, and part of the prestigious royal Hasidic Twersky family. Today there are Jewish communities in Brooklyn, New York carrying on the name Faltishan, led by Rabbi Twersky's descendants. The Jewish community of Falticeni, unlike those in the other urban communities in the present-day Suceava County, was not deported to Transnistria.

== Demographics ==
Historical population
Year	Pop.	±%
1912	8,637	—
1930	14,096	+63.2%
1948	10,563	−25.1%
1956	13,305	+26.0%
1966	17,839	+34.1%
1977	20,656	+15.8%
1992	32,807	+58.8%
2002	29,787	−9.2%
2011	24,619	−17.3%
2021	23,902	−2.9%
Source: Romanian census data

Fălticeni reached its peak population in 1992, when almost 33,000 people were living within the city limits. As of 2016, the town of Fălticeni was the third largest urban settlement in Suceava County, after the county capital, Suceava, and the town of Rădăuți.

According to the 2011 census data, 24,619 inhabitants lived in Fălticeni, a decrease from the figure recorded at the 2002 census, when the city had a population of 29,787 inhabitants. In 2011, of the city total population, 98.15% were ethnic Romanians, 0.76% Roma, 0.75% Russians (including Lipovans), 0.07% Hungarians, 0.04% Germans (namely, Regat Germans), 0.02% Ukrainians, and 0.01% Poles.

At the 2021 census, the city had a population of 23,902; of those, 85.26% were Romanians and 1.51% Roma.

== Culture ==
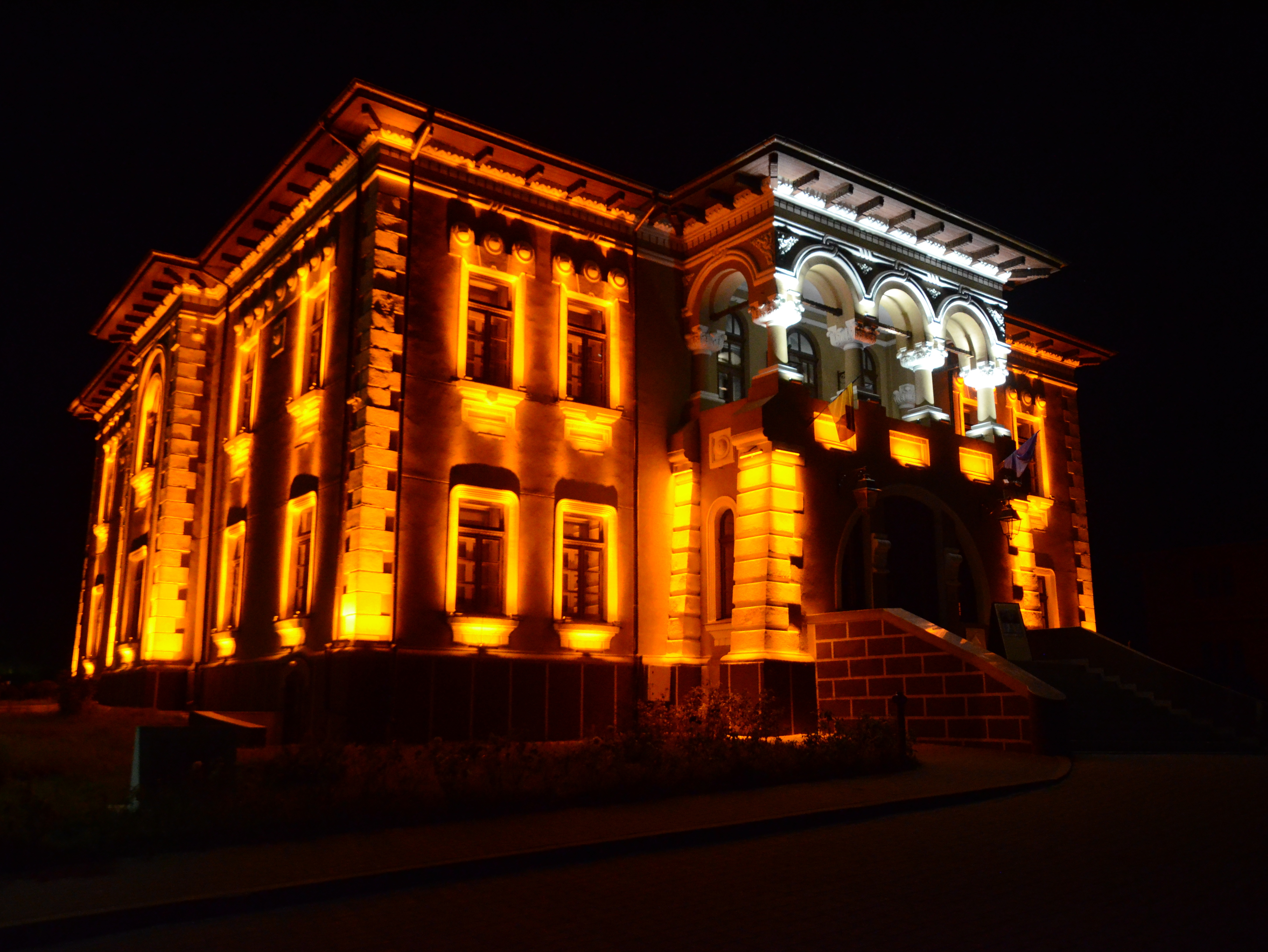
Ion Irimescu Art Museum at night

There are four museums in Fălticeni. Ion Irimescu Art Museum (Muzeul de Artă "Ion Irimescu") houses the largest collection of works of art by a single artist, Ion Irimescu, one of Romania's greatest sculptors and sketchers, as well as a member of the Romanian Academy. The museum building is a historic monument, dating from the middle of the 19th century and had various destinations until 1974, when it was given to the art museum. In 1974, Irimescu took the initiative to establish the museum, at first as a department of the Town Museum and made some donations. Later the value of the collection grew, currently being the richest author collection, and in 1991 an independent museum emerged. It comprises the most representative works by the sculptor Ion Irimescu: 313 sculptures and 1000 drawings: portraits, compositions, monument project carried out in the rondebosse or alterorelief technique, in gypsum, wood, terracotta, marble, bronze works of graphics especially donated to the museum by the author. The museum also includes the artist's personal library (1500 volumes).

Mihai Băcescu Water Museum (Muzeul Apelor "Mihai Băcescu") was founded in 1982 by the Romanian zoologist Mihai Băcescu, who was also a member of the Romanian Academy. This museum of natural sciences represents the enhancement and the development of the first museum established in Fălticeni, in 1914, by professor Vasile Ciurea.

Fălticeni is the hometown of the Lovinescu family, which gave Romania four of its most distinguished men of letters of the 20th century: literary critic Eugen Lovinescu, playwright Horia Lovinescu, esoterist Vasile Lovinescu and novelist Anton Holban. The Lovinescu family contributed to founding a memorial museum in Fălticeni, House of Notable People (Galeria Oamenilor de Seamă). The museum was opened in 1972 and represents a synthesis of the city's cultural and intellectual life.

Classics of Romanian literature, such as Ion Creangă, Mihail Sadoveanu, Vasile Alecsandri, and Nicolae Labiș, at some point in their life linked their name with that of the city by both studying and living in Fălticeni. Mihail Sadoveanu Memorial House (Casa memorială "Mihail Sadoveanu") is a museum founded in 1987 in Fălticeni, in the house where Sadoveanu lived and created between 1909 and 1918.

== Economy ==
The main industries of the city are chemical manufacture, hand-made glass, manufacturing soft drinks, clothing, and wood products. Also the fishing industry is one of the oldest base industry in the city. Most of these industries have died down after the Communist era.

== Notable people ==
- Costin Anton – painter
- Ionuț Atodiresei – kickboxer
- Adrian Avrămia – footballer
- Aurel Băeșu – painter
- J. J. Benjamin – historian and traveler
- Grigore Vasiliu Birlic – actor
- Jules Cazaban – actor, director
- Sofia Cocea – essayist, journalist, and poet
- Ion Dragoslav – writer
- Nicu Gane – writer, politician
- Bogdan Gheorghiu – politician
- Arthur Gorovei – writer, folklorist, ethnographer
- Ștefan S. Gorovei – historian
- Sofia Ionescu – neurosurgeon
- Ion Irimescu – sculptor, sketcher
- Alexandru Lambrior – folklorist
- Dimitrie Leonida – engineer, scientist
- Eugen Lovinescu – literary historian, literary critic, novelist
- Vasile Lovinescu – esoterist
- Vasile Maftei – footballer
- Maria Olaru – gymnast
- Mayer Schorr – hazzan
- Constantin Schumacher – footballer
- Gilles Ségal – actor, playwright
- Rabbi Mordechai Stein – Faltishaner Rabbe
- Ion Tănăsescu – surgeon
- Teodor Tatos – painter, writer, lawyer

Not born in Fălticeni, but artistically active there was also:

- Reuven Rubin – painter

== Gallery ==
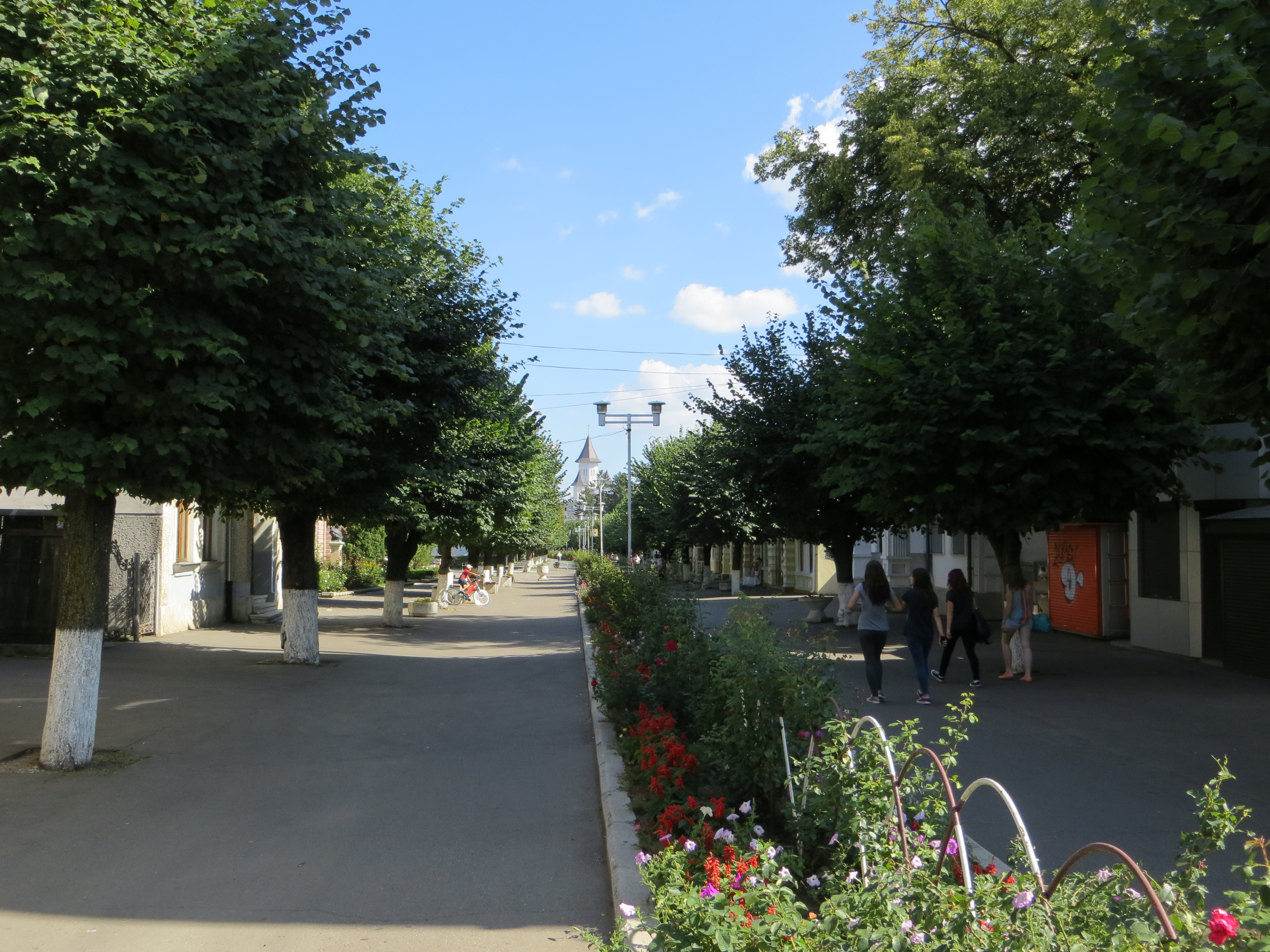
Republicii pedestrian street

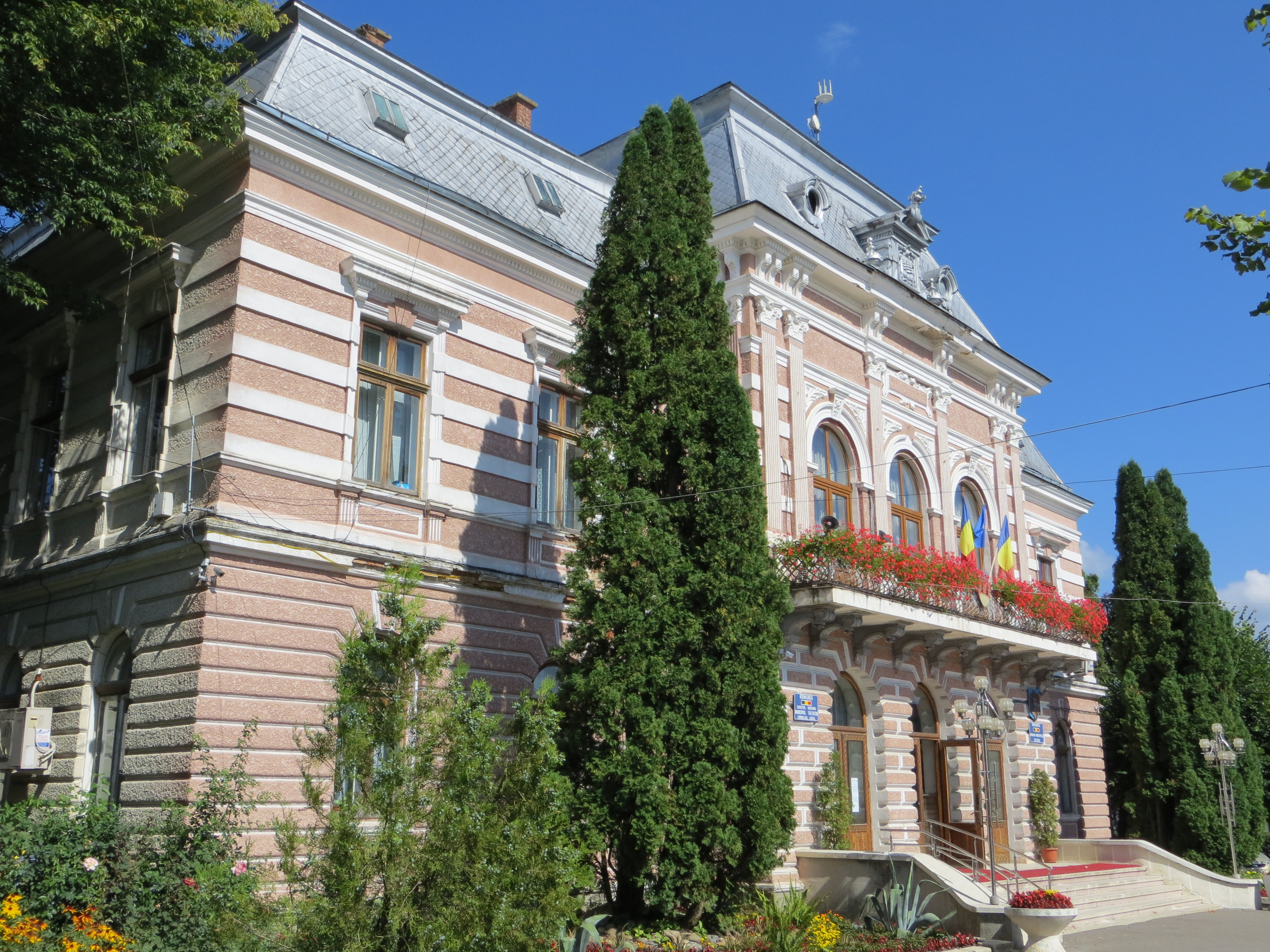
The city hall

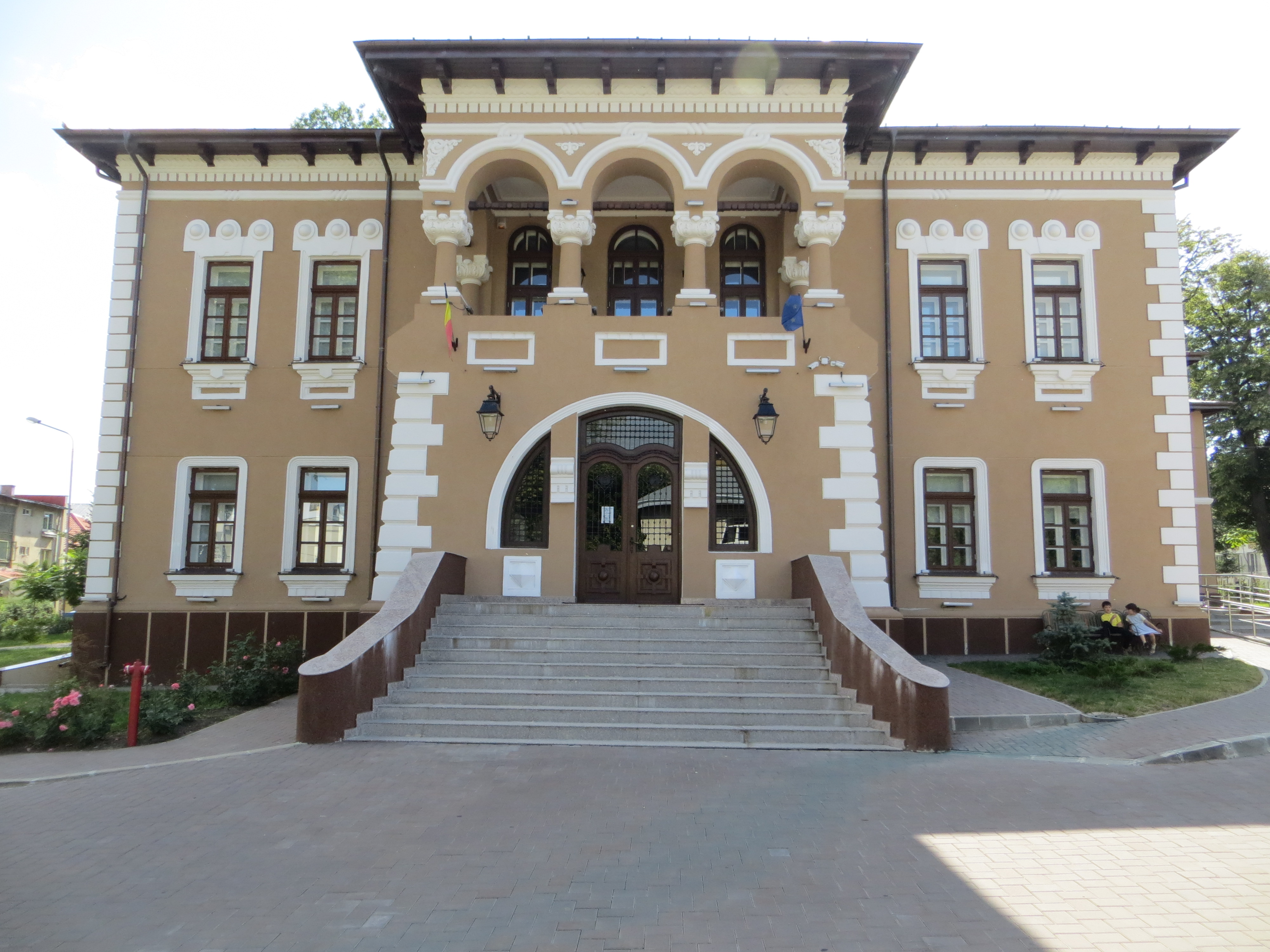
Ion Irimescu Art Museum

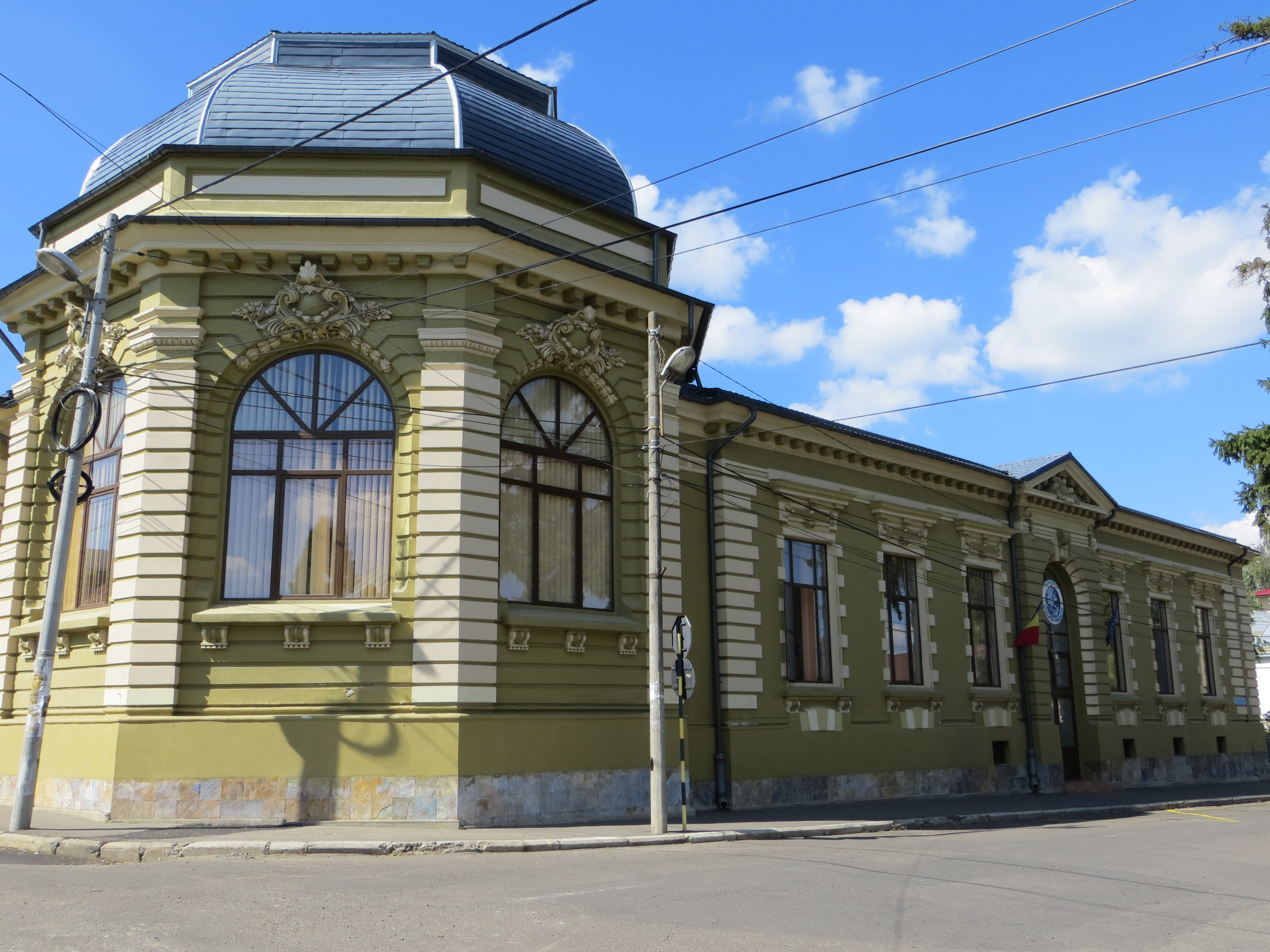
Mihai Băcescu Water Museum

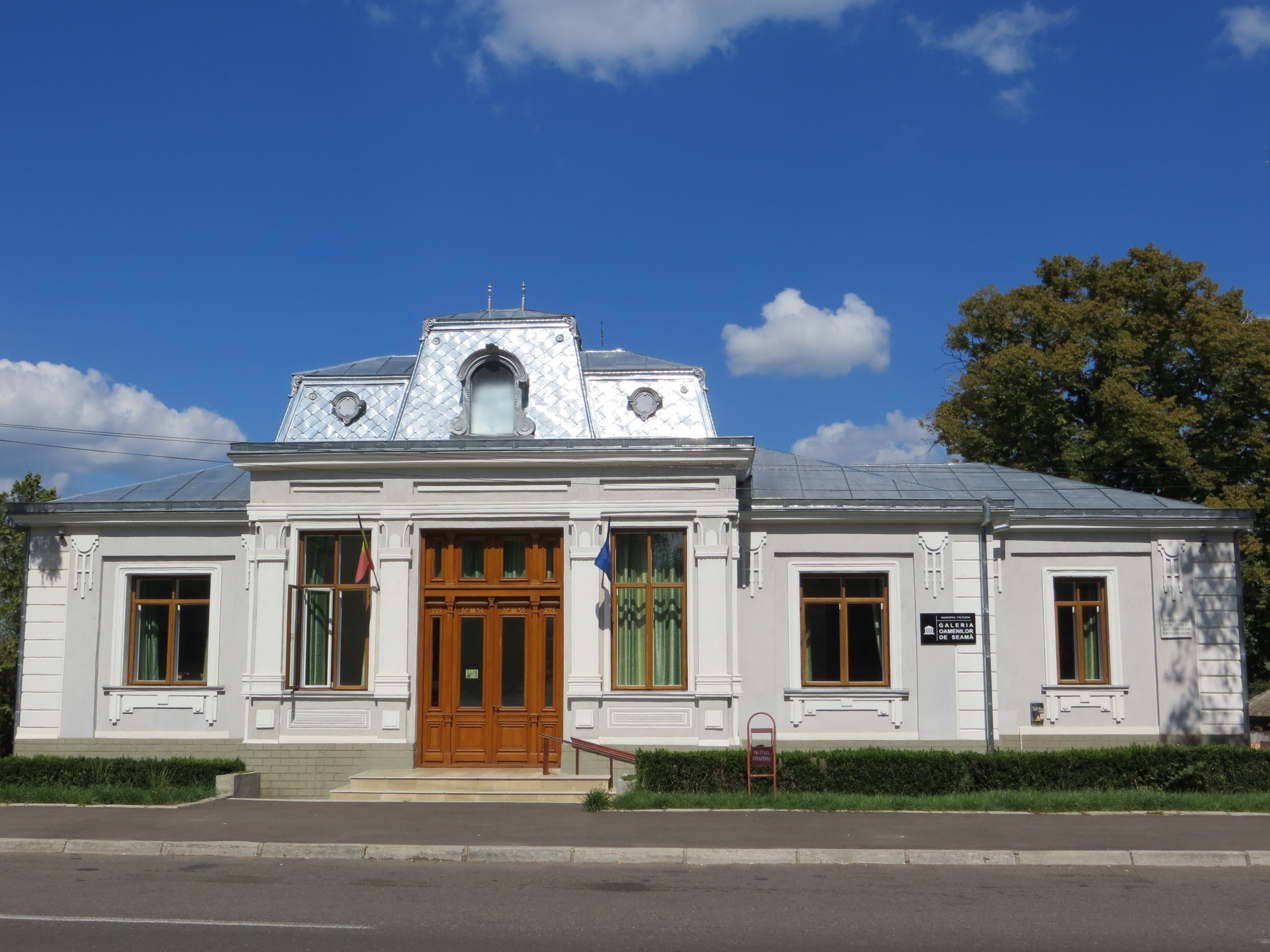
House of Notable People

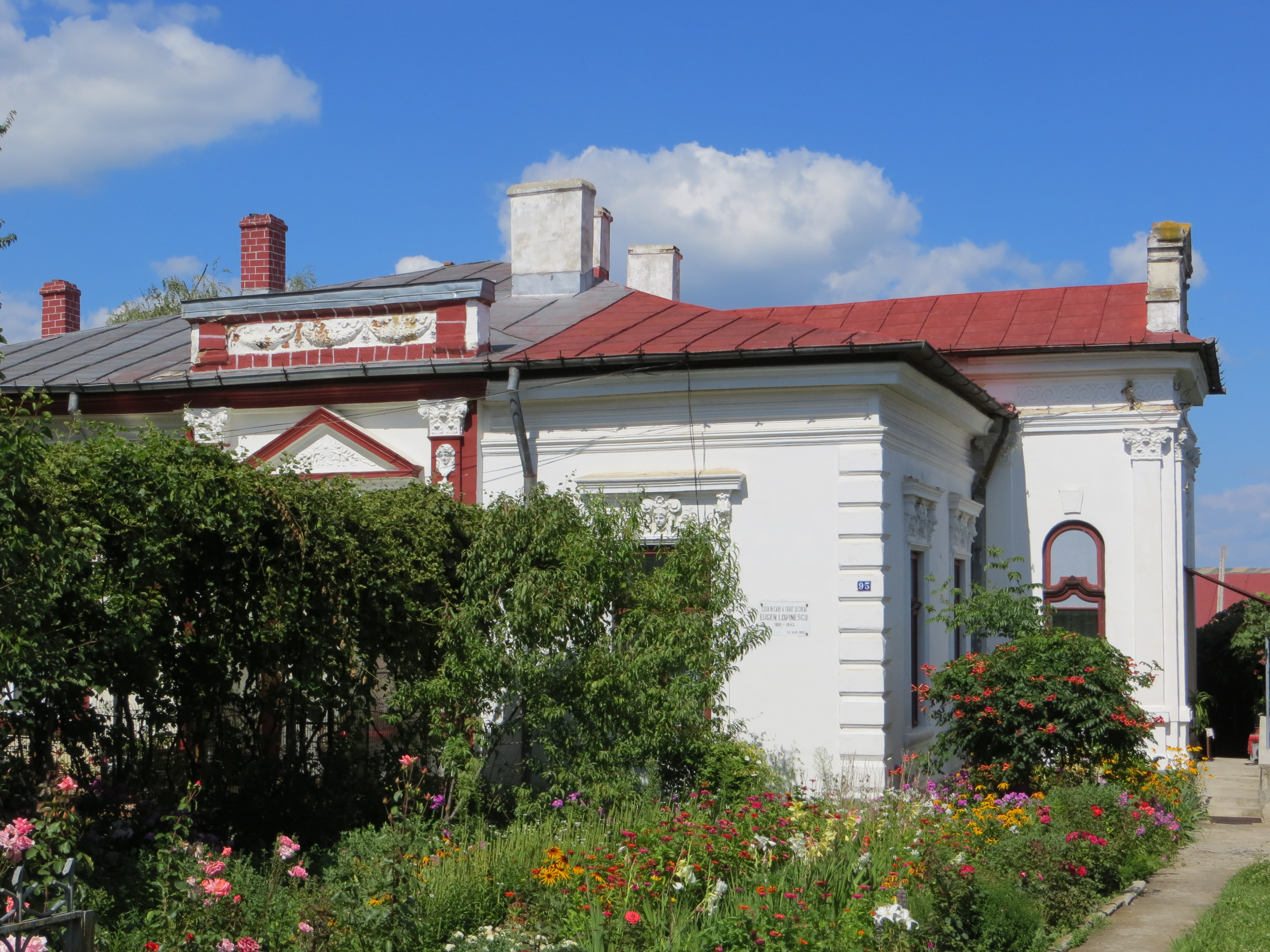
Eugen Lovinescu House

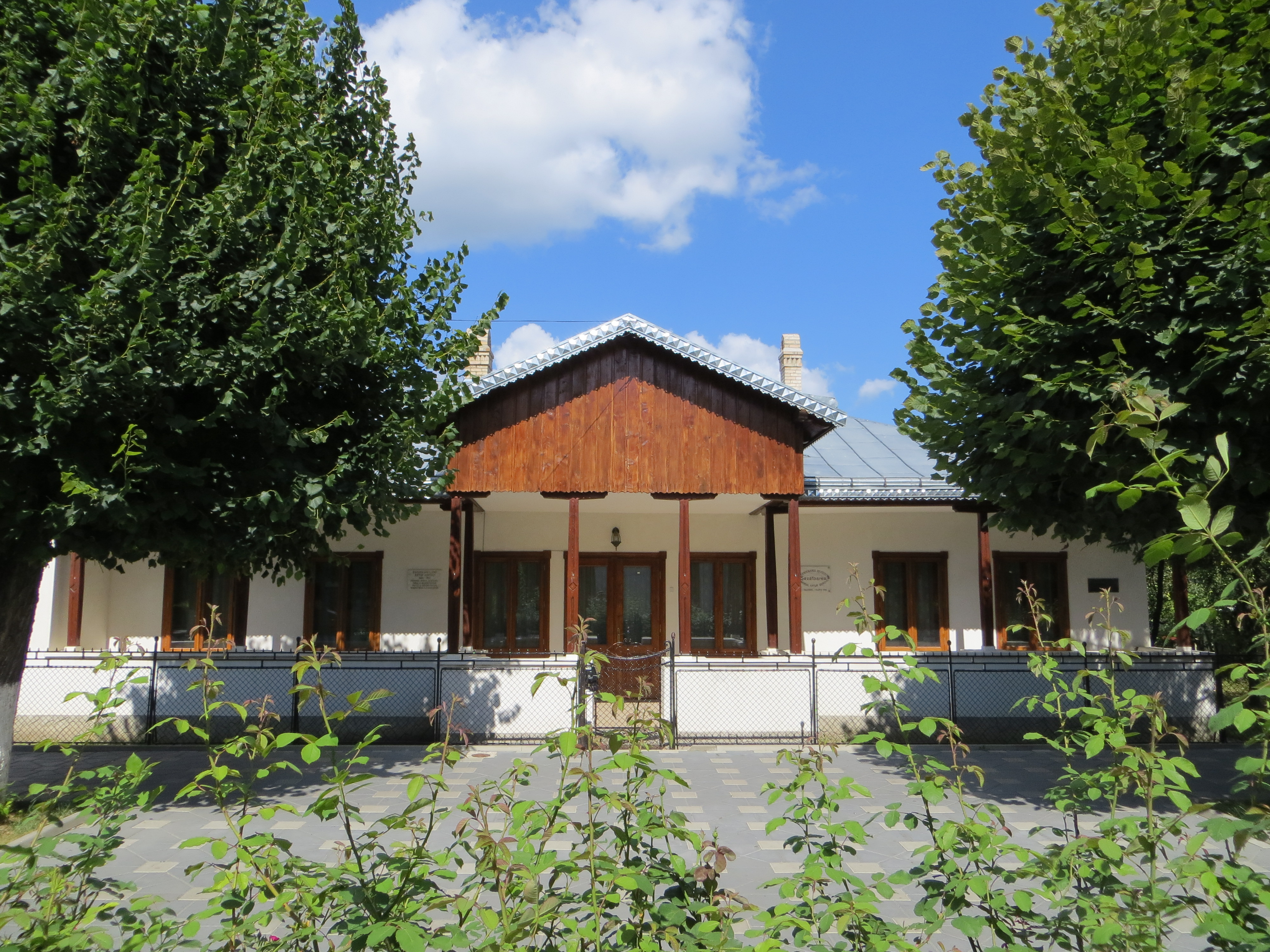
Gane-Gorovei House

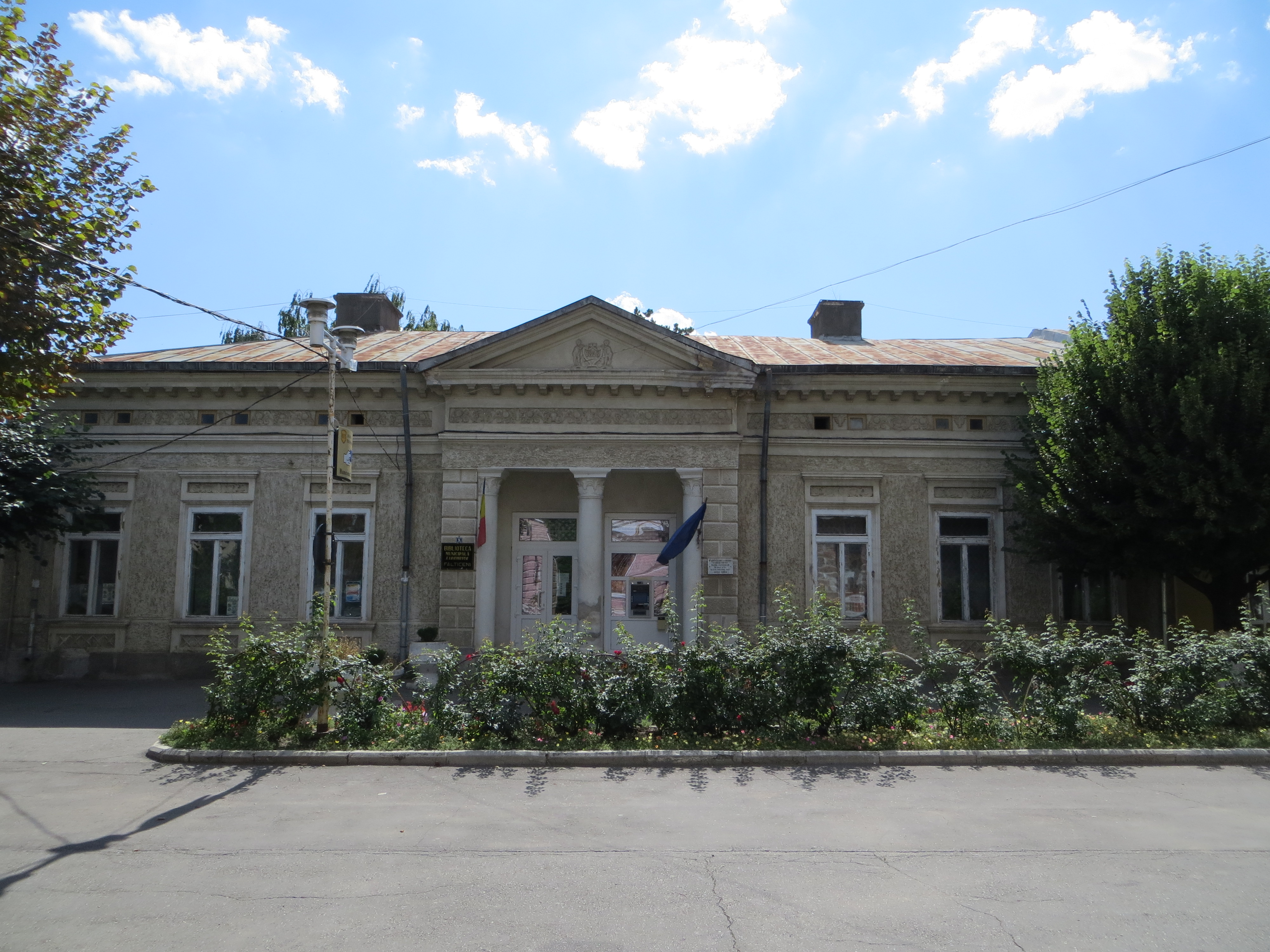
Eugen Lovinescu Public Library

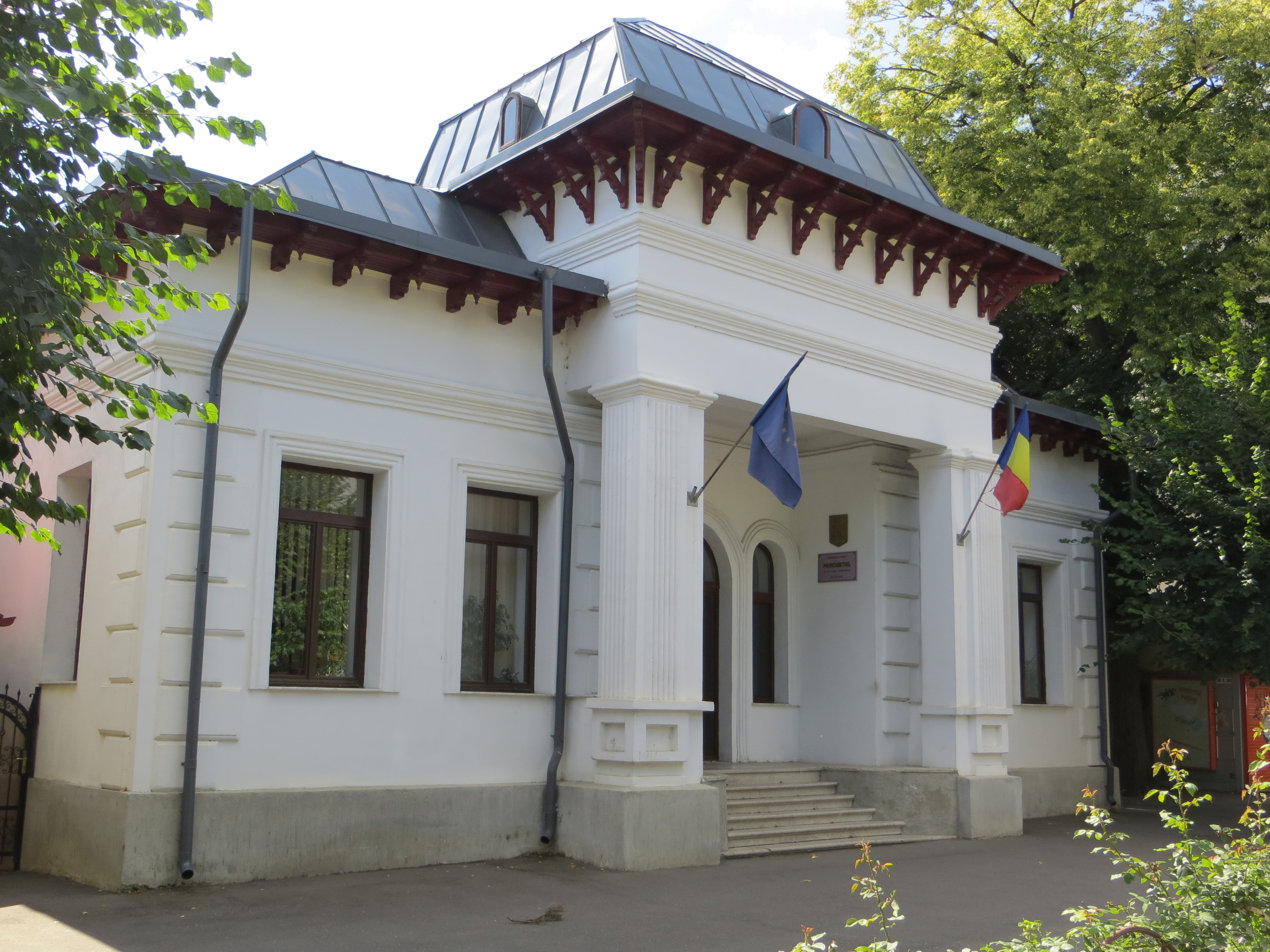
The courthouse

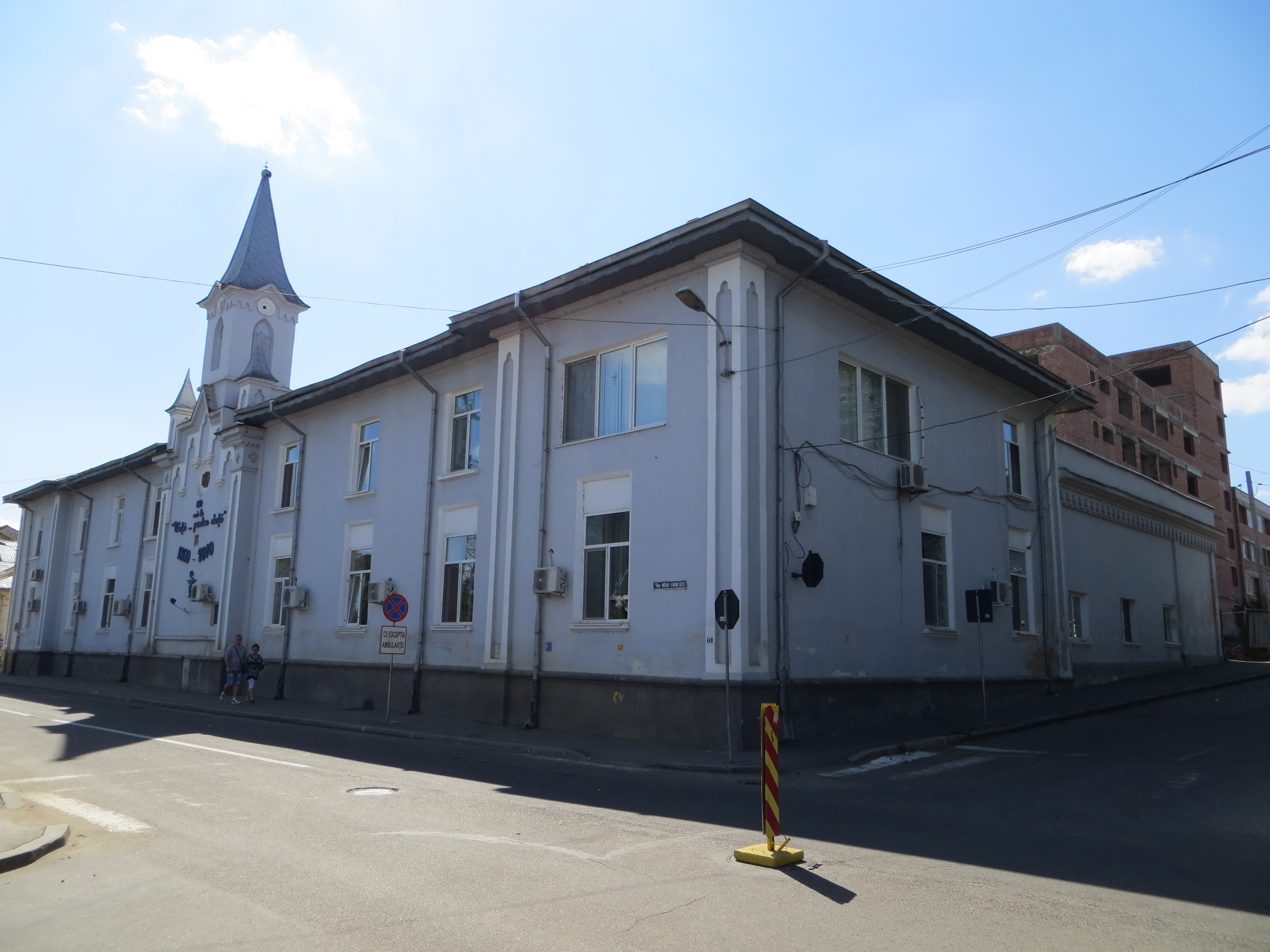
The hospital

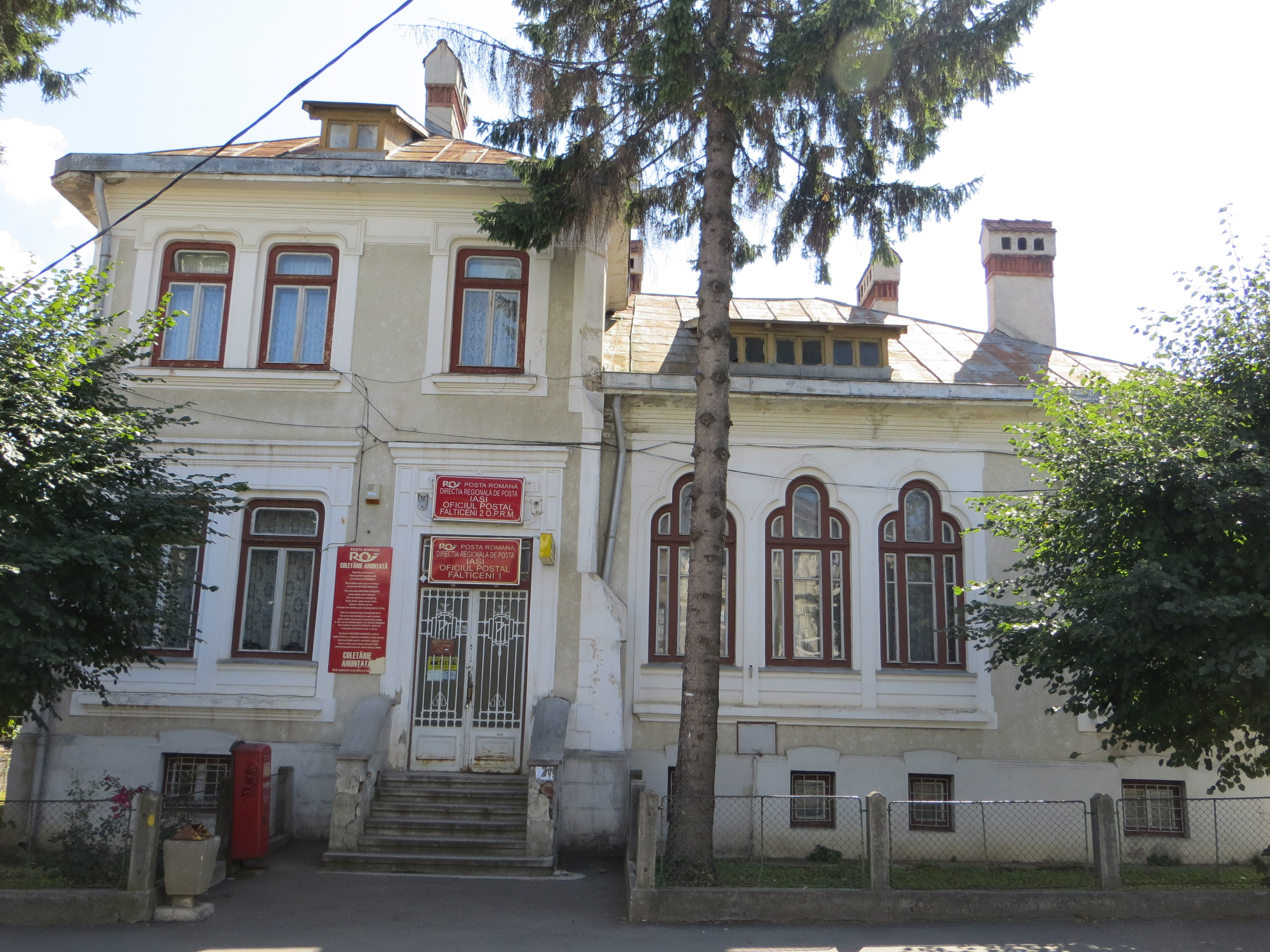
The post office

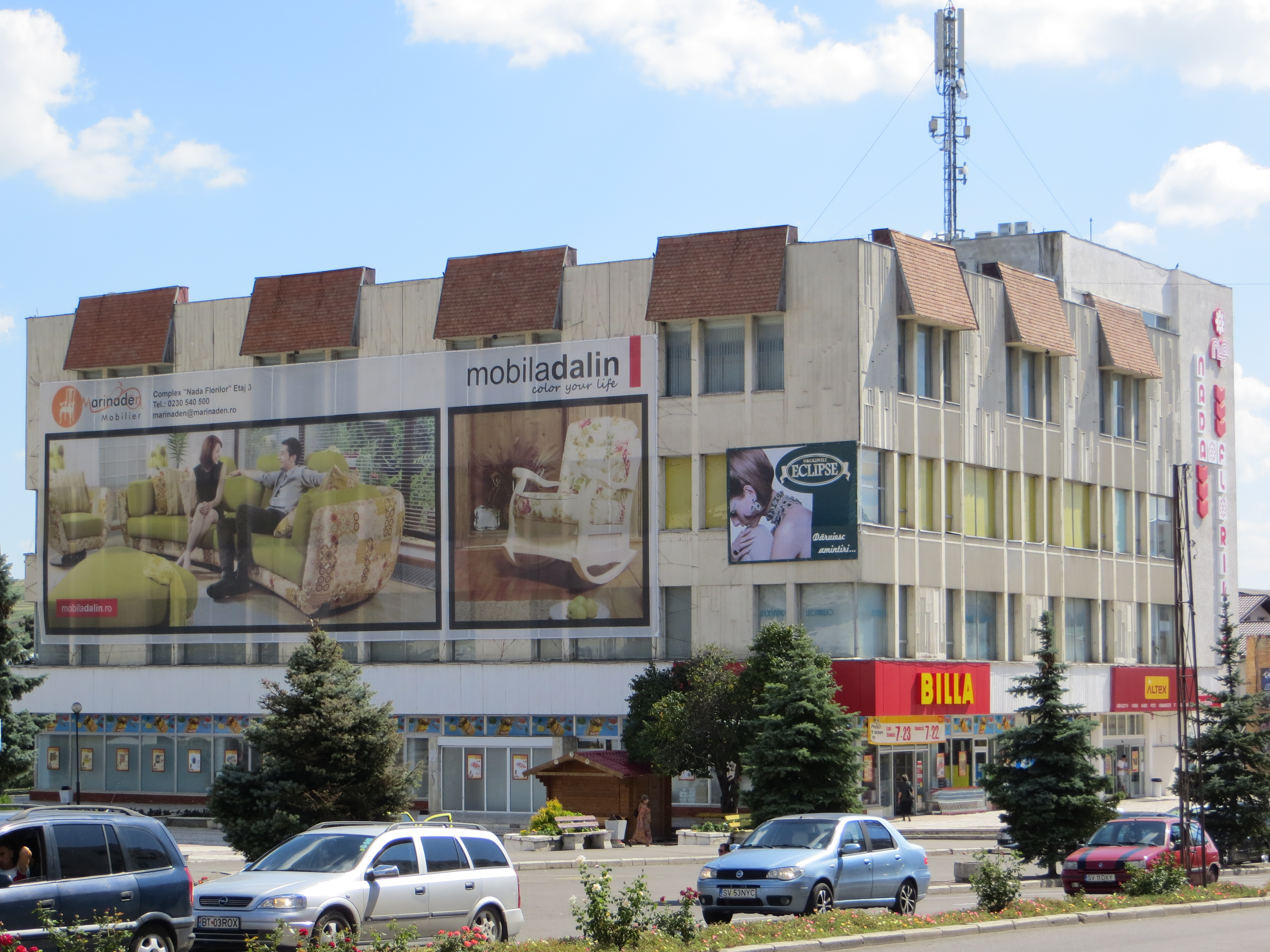
Nada Florilor Shopping Center

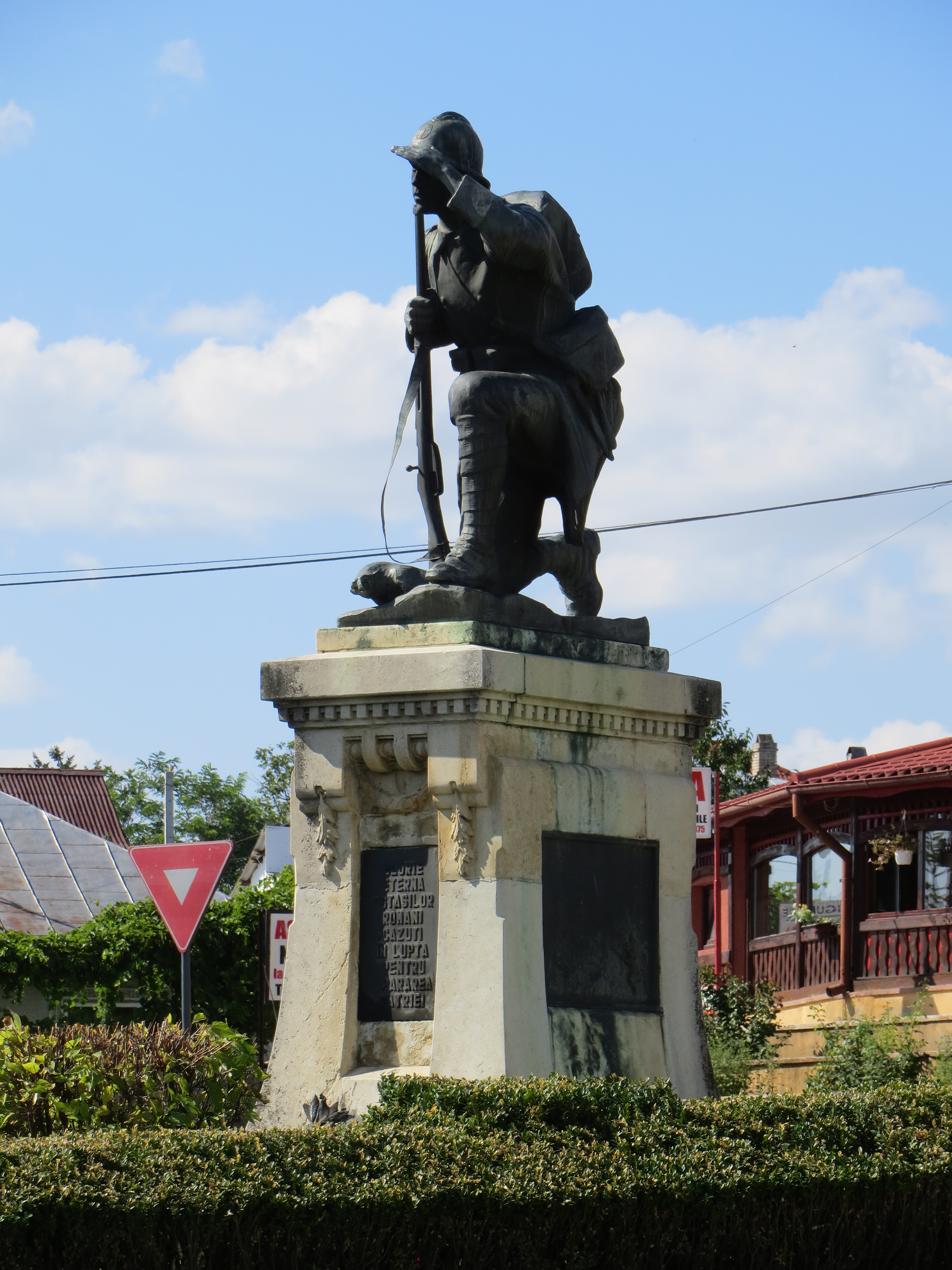
Statue of the border guard

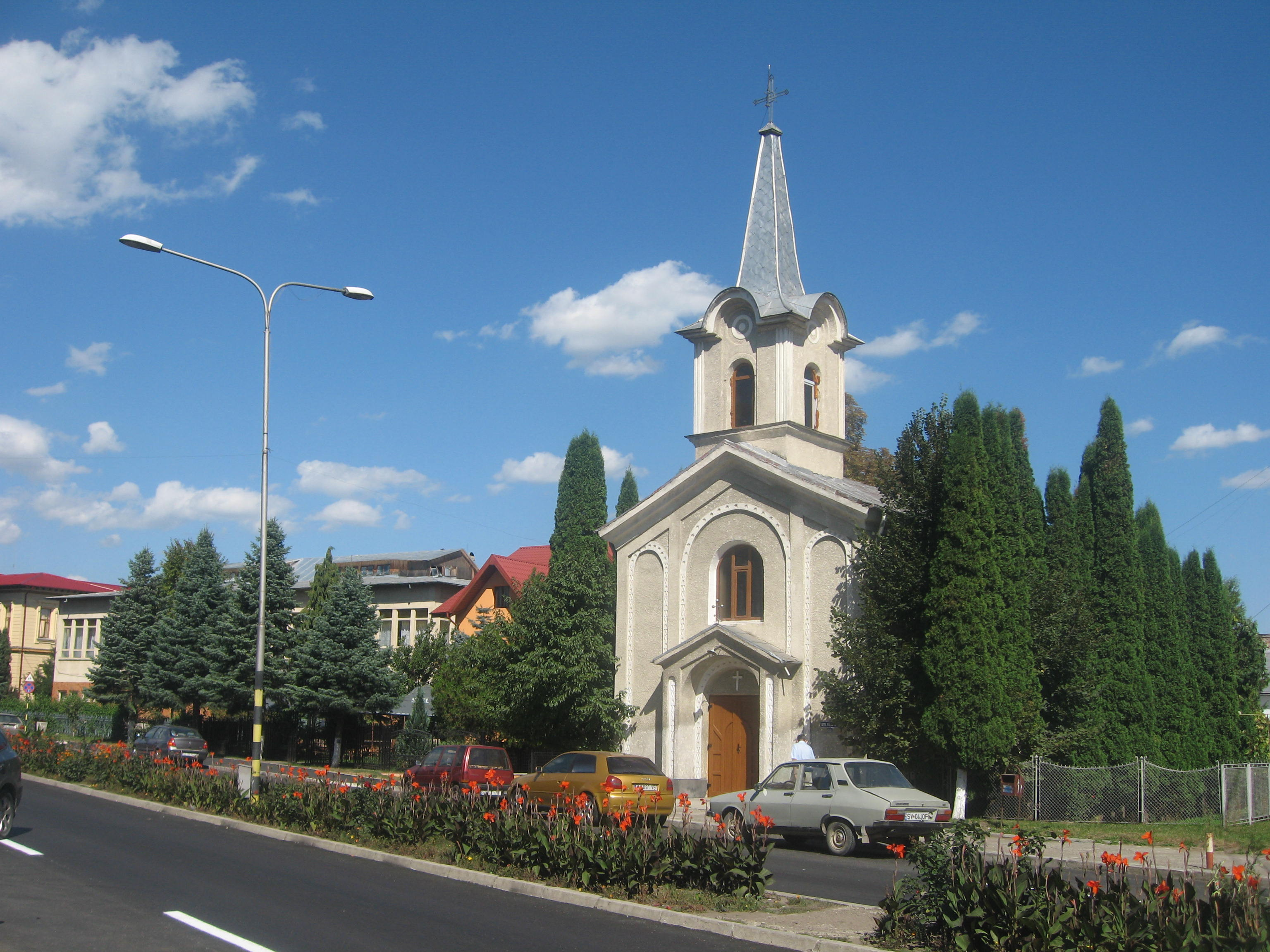
Roman Catholic church

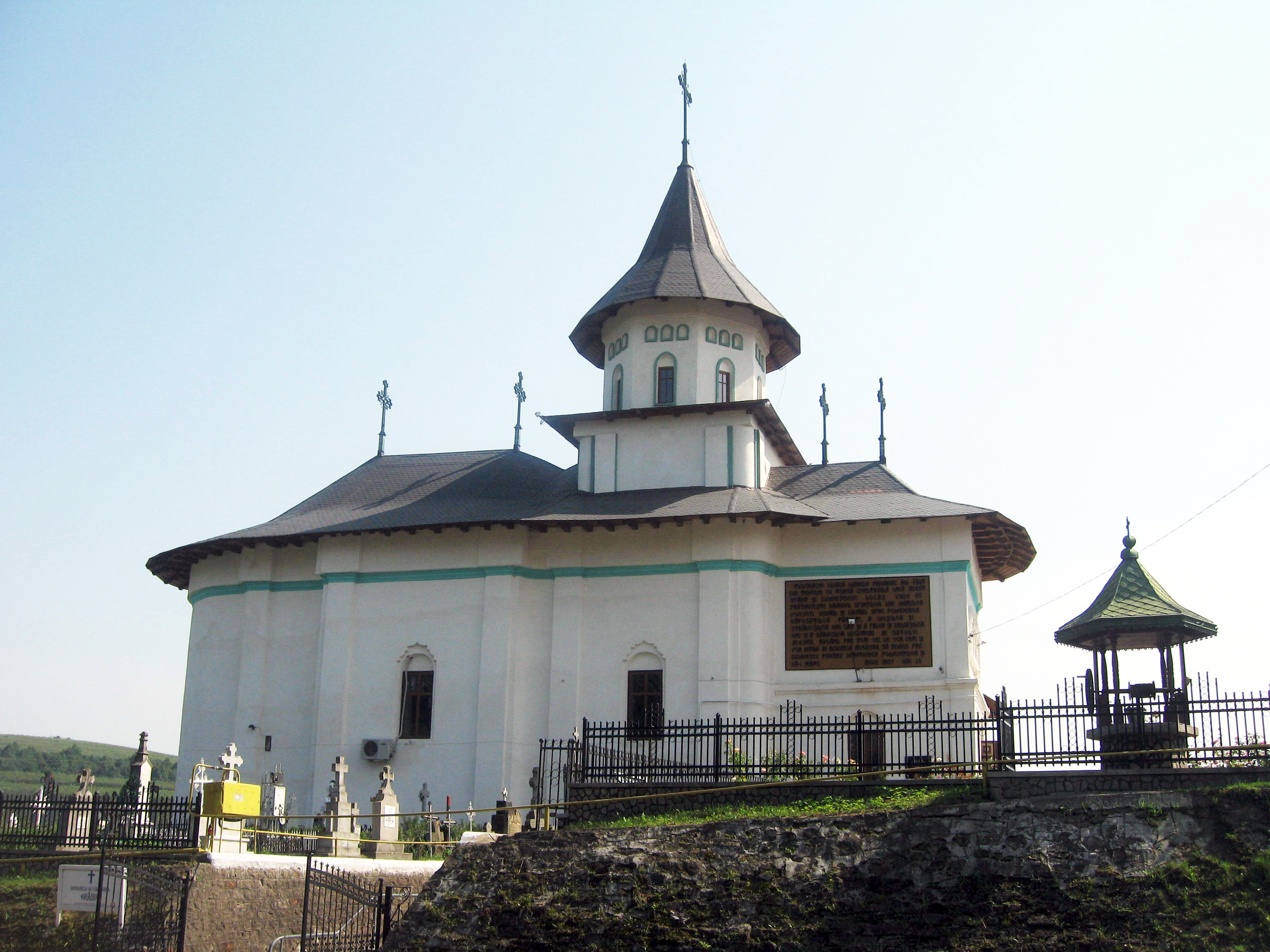
Grădini Orthodox church

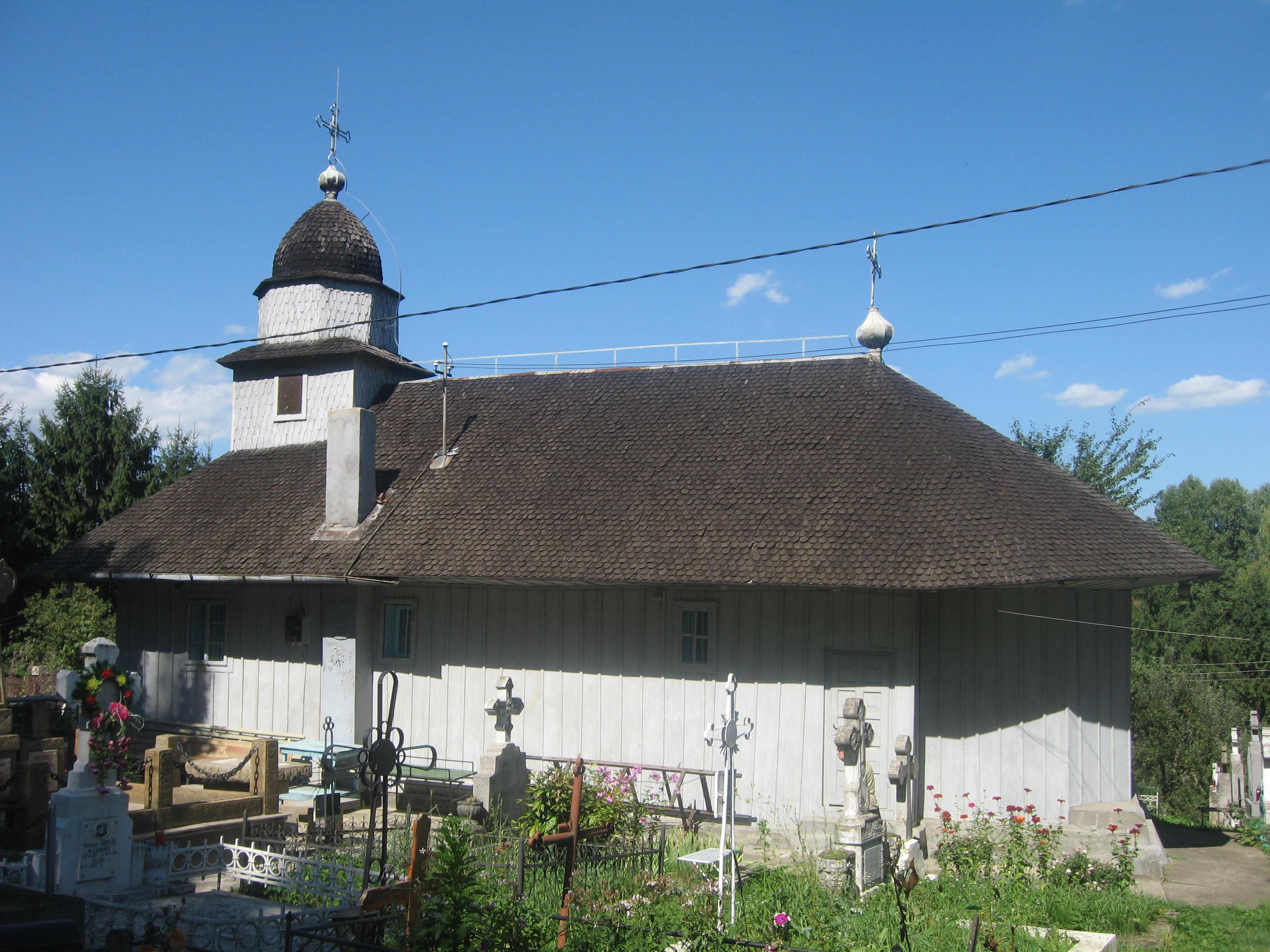
Wooden Orthodox church

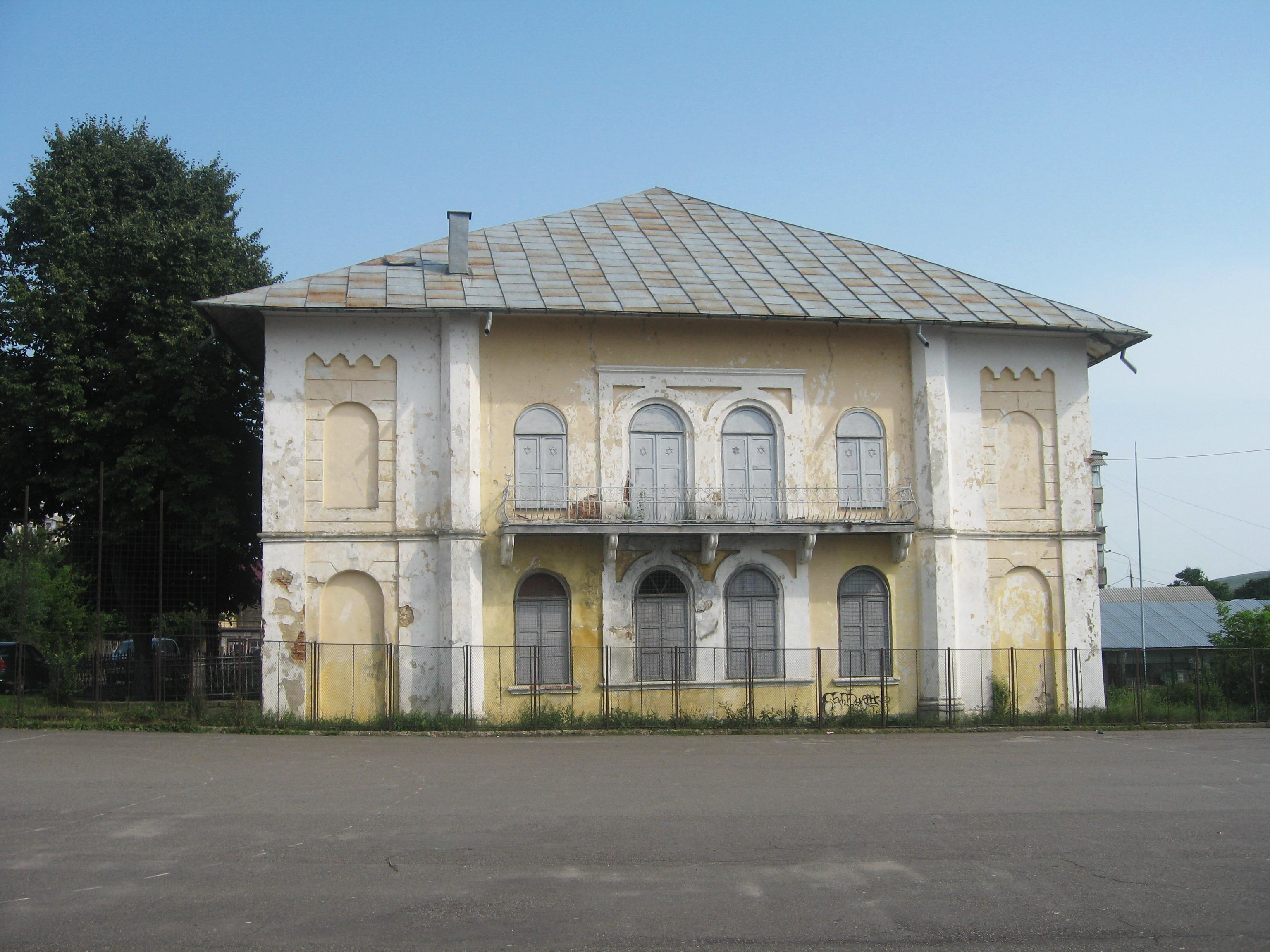
Great Synagogue

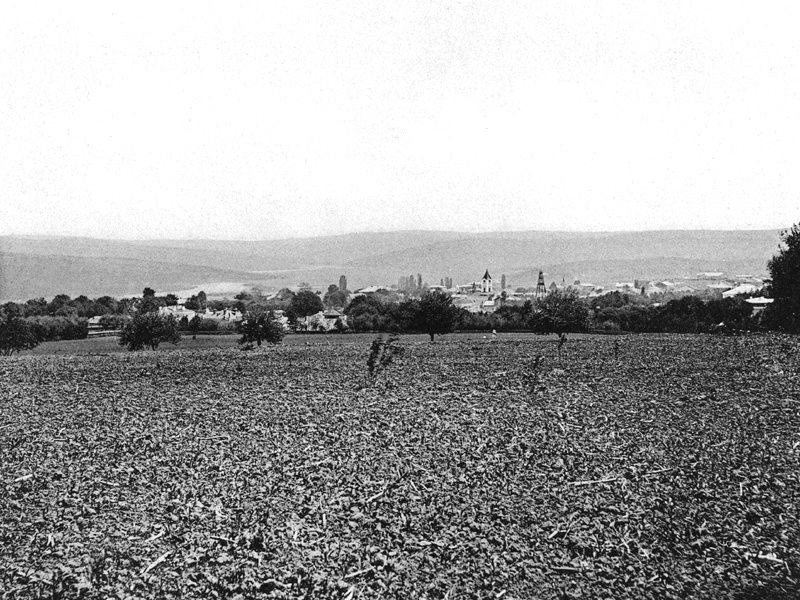
View taken between 1901 and 1904
