= Costache Antoniu =

Romanian actor

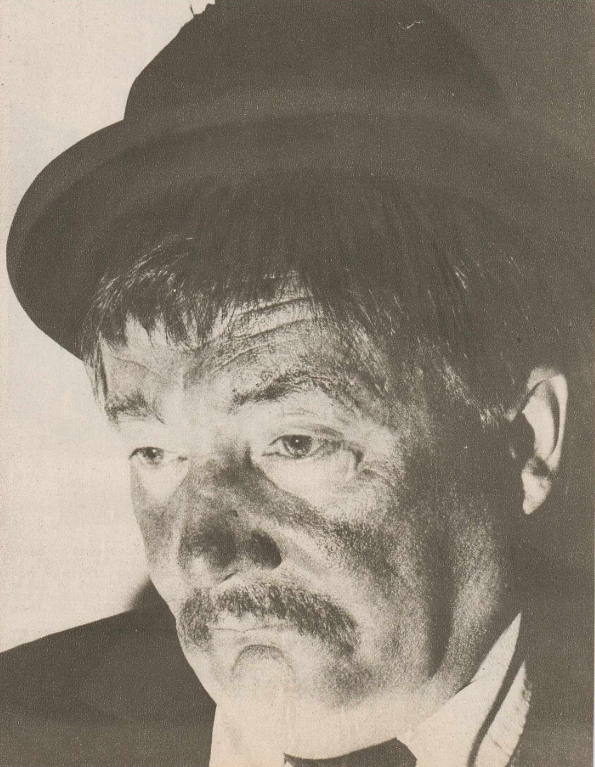
- Antoniu in 1956
- Born: 25 February 1900; Țigănași, Iași County, Kingdom of Romania
- Died: 16 June 1979 (aged 79); Bucharest, Socialist Republic of Romania
- Occupation: Actor
- Years active: 1939–1965 (film)

Costache Antoniu (Romanian pronunciation: [kosˈtace anˈtonju]; 1900–1979) was a Romanian stage and film actor.

He graduated in 1926 from the Conservatory of Dramatic Art in Iași. After playing at a theater in Sibiu, he went to the Popular Theater in Bucharest, then at the National Theater in Craiova. He acquired his reputation at the National Theatre Bucharest, where he carried out a rich activity.

Between 1955 and 1970 Antoniu was rector of the Institute of Theater and Cinematography in Bucharest.

== Filmography ==
Year	Title	Role	Notes
1939	O noapte de pomină		
1954	A Lost Letter	Cetățeanul turmentat	
1956	Nufărul roșu		
1957	Pasărea furtunii	Comandantul	
1960	Telegrame	Avocatul statului	
1960	Băieții noștri	Moșul cu caruta	
1960	Darclee	Charles Gounod	
1963	Vacanța la mare	Directorul ONT	
1964	Străinul	Profesorul Gridan	
1965	Forest of the Hanged	Preotul	
1965	Neamul Șoimăreștilor	The Innkeeper	(final film role)
