= Paul Călinescu =

Romanian film director

- Born: 23 August 1902; Galați, Kingdom of Romania
- Died: 25 March 2000 (aged 97); Bucharest, Romania
- Occupations: Film director Screenwriter
- Years active: 1934–1964

Paul Călinescu (23 August 1902 – 25 March 2000) was a Romanian film director and screenwriter. He directed 14 films between 1934 and 1964.

== Career ==
In 1936 he was appointed as Head of the Cinematographic Service of ONT Carpați, the national tourism office. As part of a collaboration agreement with the German company Tobis Klangfilm, he co-directed, together with Kurt Wesse, a series of three short films about Romania: Bucharest, the city of contrasts, Corners from Romania, and The Generation of Tomorrow. He won the first important prize of Romanian cinema at the international level, for the documentary Țara Moților, at the 1939 Venice Film Festival.

== Selected filmography ==
- România în lupta contra bolșevismului (1941)
- Floarea reginei (1946)
- The Valley Resounds (1950)
- Toamna în deltă (1951)
- Desfășurarea (1954)
- Pe răspunderea mea (1956)
- Porto-Franco (1961)
- Titanic Waltz (1964)
