= The Queen's Flower =

1946 film

- Directed by: Paul Călinescu
- Written by: Paul Călinescu
- Starring: Ioana Călinescu
- Cinematography: W. Ott.
- Release date: 1946
- Running time: 20 minutes
- Country: Romania
- Language: Romanian

The Queen's Flower (Romanian: Floarea reginei) is a 1946 Romanian short film directed by Paul Călinescu. It was entered into the 1946 Cannes Film Festival.

== Cast ==
- Ioana Călinescu
- Ileana Niculescu
- Traian Vrajbă
