= Mihai Iacob =

Romanian film director

- Born: 11 May 1933; Orăştie, Kingdom of Romania
- Died: 5 July 2009 (aged 76); Los Angeles, California, U.S.
- Occupations: Film director Screenwriter
- Years active: 1955–1972

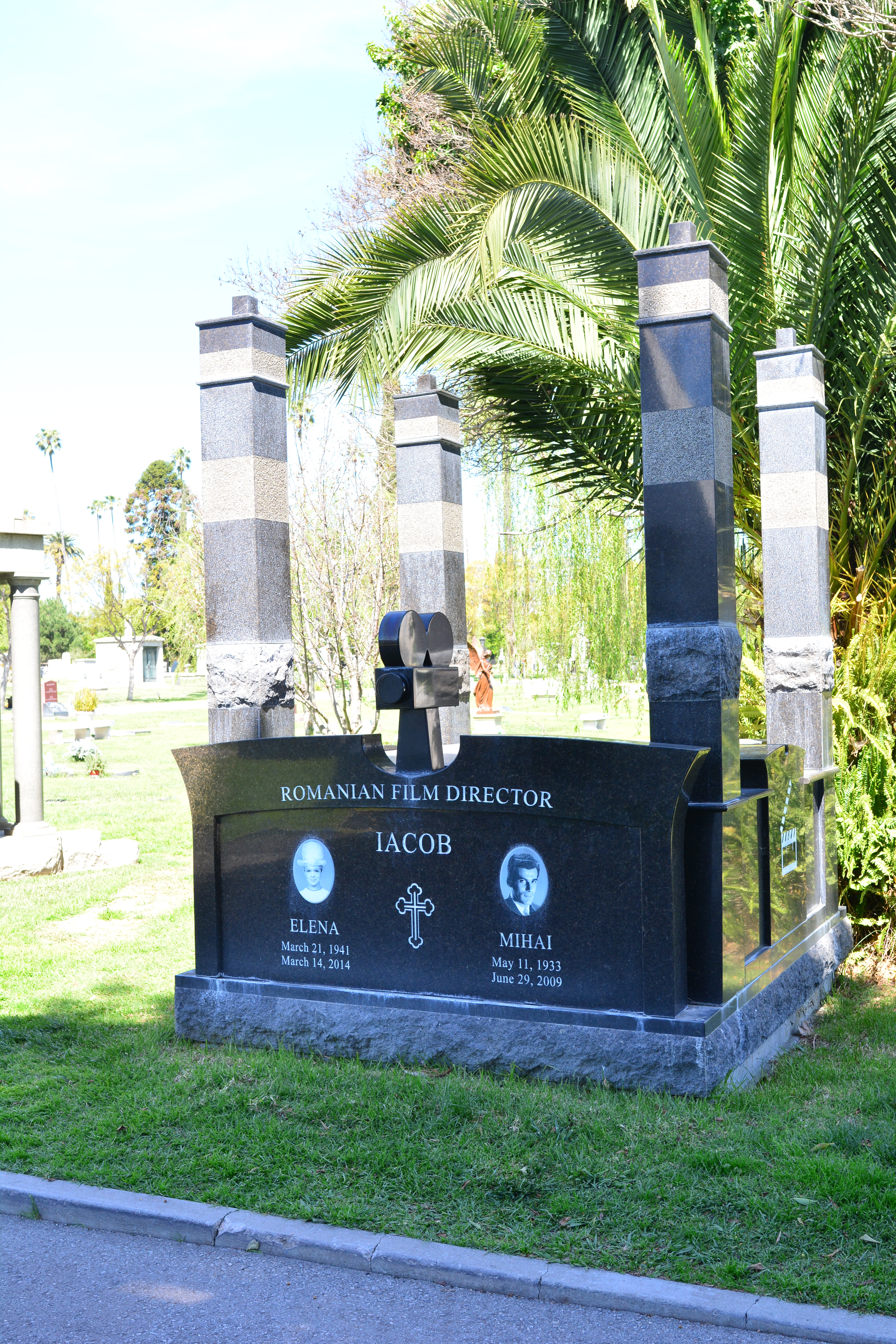
Mihai Iacob's grave, Hollywood Forever Cemetery, Los Angeles, California

Mihai Iacob (11 May 1933 – 5 July 2009) was a Romanian film director and screenwriter. He directed twelve films between 1955 and 1972. His 1961 film Thirst was entered into the 2nd Moscow International Film Festival.

== Filmography ==
- Blanca (co-director Constantin Neagu, 1955)
- Dincolo de brazi (co-director Mircea Drăgan, 1957)
- Thirst (1960)
- Darclee (1961)
- Celebrul 702 (1962)
- Străinul (1964)
- Pe drumurile Thaliei (1964)
- Politețe (1966, documentary)
- De trei ori București (co-directors Ion Popescu-Gopo and Horea Popescu, 1967, anthology film)
- Tom Sawyers und Huckleberry Finns Abenteuer (dir. Wolfgang Liebeneiner, 1968, TV miniseries)
- Castelul condamnaților (1969)
- Pentru că se iubesc (1972)
- The Crazy Stranger (1997)
