= Gheorghe Naghi =

Romanian film director and actor (1932–2019)

- Born: 18 August 1932; Adjudu Vechi, Putna County, Kingdom of Romania
- Died: 10 March 2019 (aged 86); Bucharest, Romania
- Education: Gerasimov Institute of Cinematography
- Occupations: Film director Actor
- Years active: 1955–1991
- Spouse: Eugenia Naghi

Gheorghe Naghi (Romanian pronunciation: [ˈɡe̯orɡe ˈnaɡʲ]; 18 August 1932 – 10 March 2019) was a Romanian film director and actor. He directed 25 films between 1955 and 1991.

Born in Adjudu Vechi, he graduated from the Gerasimov Institute of Cinematography in Moscow in 1955. He was married to Eugenia Naghi (1928–2007), and he died in Bucharest in 2019, aged 86.

== Filmography ==
- După concurs (1955)
- Două lozuri (1957), with Aurel Miheleș
- D-ale carnavalului (1958), with Aurel Miheleș
- Telegrame (1959), with Aurel Miheleș
- Bădăranii (1960), with Sică Alexandrescu
- Lumina de iulie (1963)
- Globul de cristal (1964)
- Vremea zăpezilor (1966)
- Cine va deschide ușa? (1967)
- Doi bărbați pentru o moarte (1969)
- Legende contemporane (1972)
- Aventuri la Marea Neagră (1972)
- Aventurile lui Babușcă (1973)
- Viața obligată (1974)
- Elixirul tinereții (1975)
- Alarmă în Deltă (1975)
- Reacții (1976)
- Ultima poveste (1976)
- Ciocolată cu alune (1978)
- Dumbrava minunată (1980)
- Fiul munților (1981)
- Acțiunea Zuzuc (1984)
- Taina jocului de cuburi (1990)
- De-aș fi Peter Pan (1991)
