= Darclee =

1961 film

- Directed by: Mihai Iacob
- Written by: Constantin Cîrjan; Ionel Hristes
- Starring: Silvia Popovici
- Cinematography: Andrei Feher
- Edited by: M. Teodoru
- Release date: 1961
- Country: Romania
- Language: Romanian

Darclee is a 1961 Romanian drama film directed by Mihai Iacob. It was entered into the 1961 Cannes Film Festival.

== Cast ==
- Silvia Popovici as Darclée
- Victor Rebengiuc as Iorgu
- Marcel Anghelescu
- Costache Antoniu
- Chris Avram
- Geo Barton
- Jules Cazaban
- Ion Dichiseanu
- Toma Dimitriu
- Fory Etterle
- Ion Manu
- Ștefan Mihăilescu-Brăila
- Nelly Nicolau
- Amza Pellea
- Eugenia Popovici
- Nae Roman
