= Elvira Godeanu =

Romanian actress

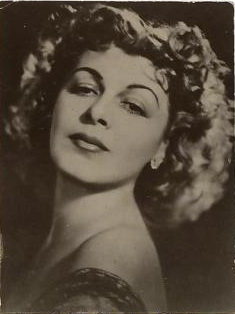
- Born: 13 May 1904; Bucharest, Kingdom of Romania
- Died: 3 September 1991 (aged 87); Bucharest, Romania
- Occupation: Actress
- Years active: 1927–1953 (film)

Elvira Godeanu (13 May 1904 – 3 September 1991) was a Romanian stage actress. She also appeared in four films.

== Selected filmography ==
- Povara (1928)
- A Lost Letter (1953)

== Bibliography ==
- Modorcea, Grid (1997). Istoria gândirii estetice românești de film (in Romanian). Emin. ISBN 9789739694940.
