= Alexandru Giugaru =

Romanian actor (1897–1986)

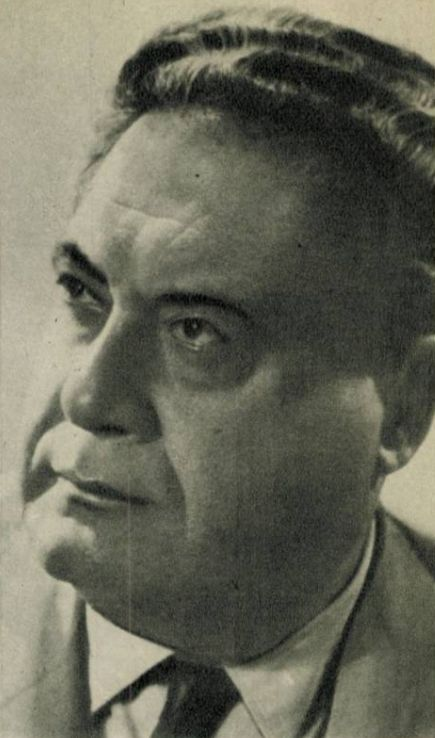
- Born: 23 June 1897; Huși, Kingdom of Romania
- Died: 15 March 1986 (aged 88); Bucharest, Socialist Republic of Romania
- Education: National University of Music Bucharest
- Occupation: Actor
- Years active: 1916–1968

Alexandru Giugaru (Romanian pronunciation: [alekˈsandru dʒjuˈɡaru]; 23 June 1897 – 15 March 1986) was a Romanian stage and film actor.

== Early life ==
Born in Huși, Fălciu County (present day Vaslui County), Romania, Giugaru began his stage career in 1916 after graduating from school in Cuza Vodă and studying at the Conservatory of Dramatic Arts in Bucharest.

== Career ==
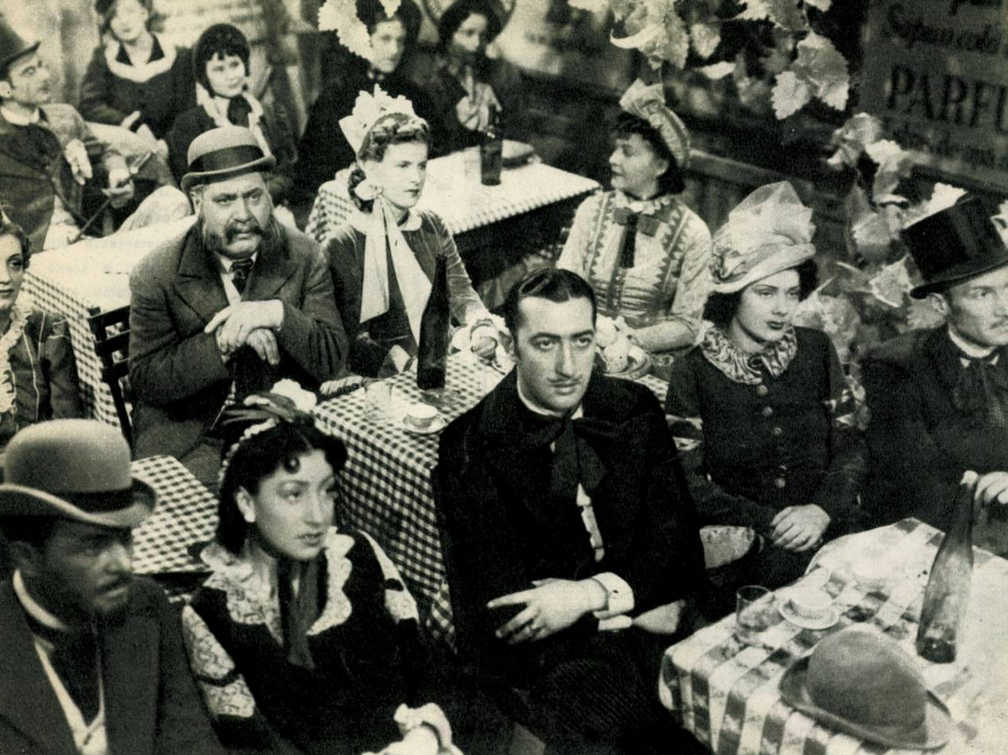
Giugaru (only man seated in the second row) in a scene from Jean Georgescu's film adaptation of Ion Luca Caragiale's play A Stormy Night

After performing on various stages in Romania — including the National Theatre in Bucharest — he made the transition to film in 1925's Năbădăile Cleopatrei. Between 1925 and his retirement from the film industry in 1968, he appeared in over twenty films. His last film role before retirement was in 1968's Răpirea fecioarelor, directed by Dinu Cocea and starring Toma Caragiu and Marga Barbu.

For his work on stage and film Giugaru obtained the title of Emeritus Artist and the State Prize in 1964. Today, the House of Culture in the city of Huși bears his name and there is a street named after him in Bucharest (Strada Alexandru Giugaru).

== Personal life ==
Alexandru Giugaru had two children; a son and a daughter. He died in Bucharest in 1986. In 2004, his daughter Alexandrina brought accusations of "piracy" against Societatea Română de Televiziune for using images of her father and his voice to promote the television station.

== Filmography ==
Year	Title	Role	Notes
1925	Năbădăile Cleopatrei		
1925	Legenda celor două cruci		
1926	Cererea in căsătorie		
1929	Storm of Love		
1932	Take, Ianke și Cadîr	Tache	
1943	A Stormy Night	Master Dumitrache Titircă	
1954	A Lost Letter	Zaharia Trahanache	
1955	Popescu 10 în control	Aristică Bălănel	
1955	Directorul nostru	Director of the D.R.G.B.P.	
1955	Două lozuri	Police Commissioner Turtureanu	
1958	D-ale carnavalului	Iancu Pampon	
1960	Telegrame	The Prosecutor of the County Court	
1960	Bădăranii	The Merchant Lunardo Crèzzola	
1960	Băieții noștri	Head of the Club	
1962	Post restant	Portarul	
1963	Tudor	The Clucer Nicolae Glogoveanu	
1964	Mofturi 1900	Nae	
1965	Doi băieți ca pâinea caldă	Meșterul Tănase	
1966	Haiducii	The Boyar Belivacă	
1966	Corigența domnului profesor	Plutonierul Vasile	
1968	Răpirea fecioarelor	Hristea Belivacă	
1968	Vin cicliștii		
1974	Bălcescu		
