= Jules Cazaban =

Romanian playwright and director

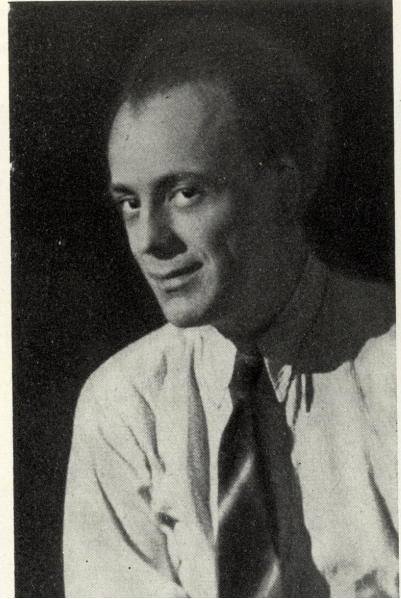

Jules Cazaban (March 16, 1903 – September 23, 1963) was a Romanian playwright and director.

Born in Fălticeni, Romania, he studied law at the University of Iași. He then studied at the Conservatory of Dramatic Art in the same city and made his stage debut in 1927, appearing in Tristan Bernard’s "The Little Café" at the Iași National Theatre.

At the beginning of his activity, he was a theater actor in Iași (between 1927 and 1929). In 1929, he moved to Bucharest, and worked in the theatre, radio, and movie industries until his death; he was primarily based at Bucharest’s Municipal Theater.

Cazaban’s stage appearances included Shakespeare’s "As You Like It" and "Twelfth Night", Dürrenmatt’s "The Visit of the Old Lady", Miller’s "Death of a Traveling Salesman", Sarment’s "Mamouret", Shaw’s "You Never Know", Mayakovsky’s "The Bath", and Victor Ion Popa’s "Take, Ianke and Cadâr". He worked with the National Radio Theatre, and featured in over 30 plays produced for broadcasting, including works by Popa, Cocteau, Petrescu, Gorky, and Ostrovski. His films include Life Triumphs (1951), Telegrame (1959), The Storm (1960), Darclee (1961), and Thirst (1961).

He was a professor at the Institute of Theatre and Cinematography in Bucharest. He was awarded the titles of Emeritus Artist and People's Artist (before 1960).

Cazaban died in Bucharest, at age 60, and was buried in the city's Bellu Cemetery.

== Family ==
Jules was the older brother of the writer, Theodor Cazaban, who spent time in exile in Paris; Jules married actress Irina Nădejde, thus becoming the son-in-law of journalist Iosif Nădejde; the couple had a son, composer and musicologist Costin Cazaban.
