= Thirst (1961 film) =

1961 film

- Directed by: Mircea Drăgan; Mihai Iacob
- Written by: Titus Popovici
- Starring: Mircea Balaban
- Release date: July 1961
- Country: Romania
- Language: Romanian

Thirst (Romanian: Setea) is a 1961 Romanian drama film directed by Mircea Drăgan and Mihai Iacob. It was entered into the 2nd Moscow International Film Festival where it won the Silver Prize.

== Cast ==
- Mircea Balaban
- Ion Besoiu
- Flavia Buref
- George Calboreanu
- Jules Cazaban
- Ilarion Ciobanu
- Stefan Ciubotarasu
- Benedict Dabija
- Toma Dimitriu
- Dumitru Furdui
- Gheorghe Maruta
- Mihai Mereuta
- Amza Pellea
- Alexandru Virgil Platon
- Eugenia Popovici
- Colea Rautu
- Paul Sava
- Sandu Sticlaru
- Vasile Tomazian
- Lazar Vrabie
