= Darie =

Darie is a male given name and surname. Notable people with the surname include:

- Darie Magheru (1923–1983), Romanian poet and theatre actor
- Iurie Darie (1929–2012), Romanian actor
- Vladimir Darie (born 1952), Moldovan historian, journalist, and politician
- Alexandru Darie (1959–2019), Romanian director and manager of Bulandra Theater
