= Adina Cezar =

Romanian coreographer

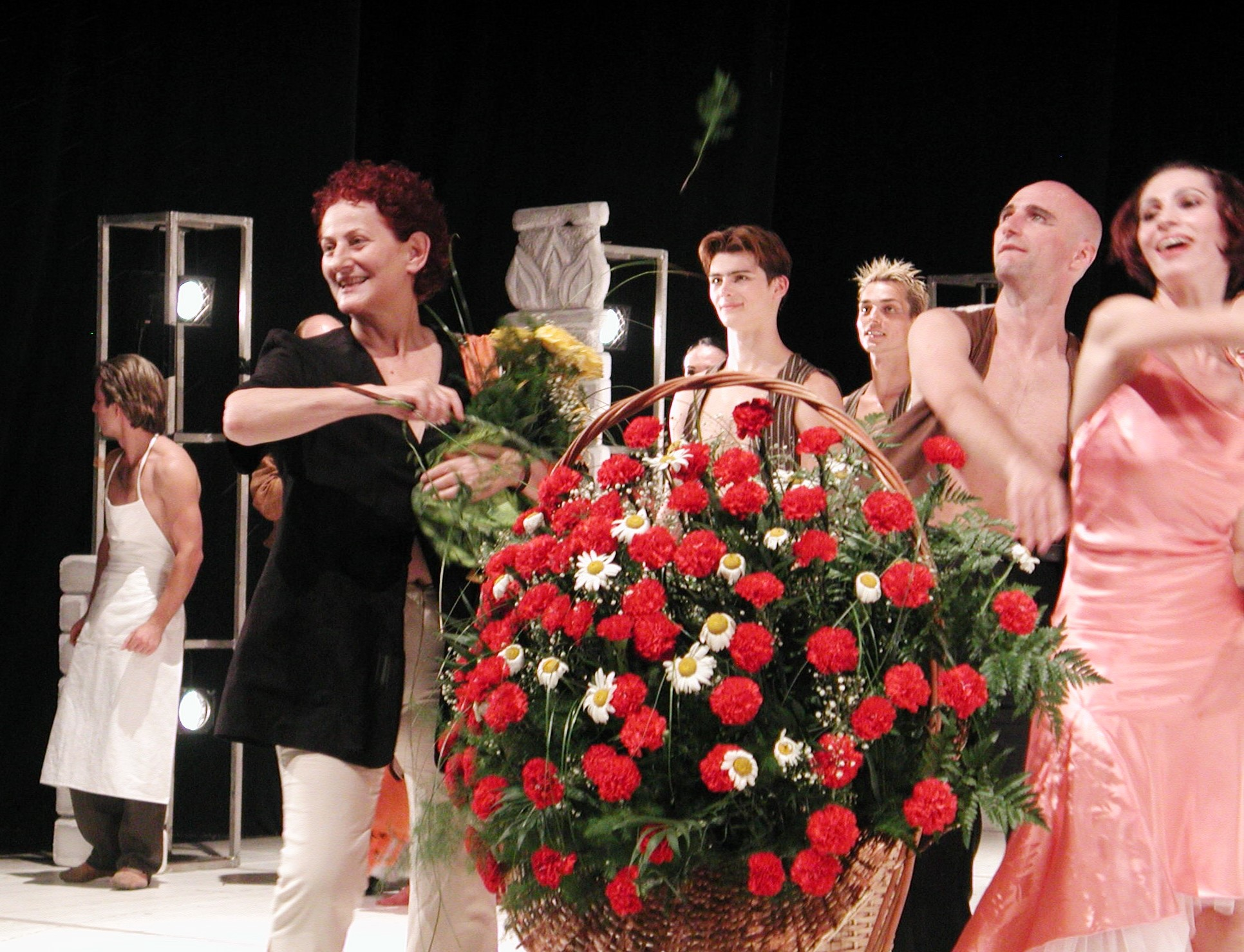
- Born: Elena Constantina Daneș; May 22, 1941; Călimănești, Romania
- Died: March 17, 2024 (aged 82)
- Occupations: Choreographer, dancer, professor
- Years active: 1957–2020
- Spouse: Corneliu Cezar (m. 1964; div. 1978)
- Children: 1
- Website: adinacezar.com

Adina Cezar (born Elena Constantina Daneș; 22 May 1941 – 17 March 2024) was a Romanian choreographer, dancer, and professor. She is considered one of the pioneers of Romanian contemporary dance, having founded the Contemp Dance Company in 1973, which became the first contemporary dance company with permanent artistic activity in Romania.

== Early life and education ==
Cezar graduated from the Choreography High School in Bucharest in 1957. From 1969 to 1970, she was a French Government scholarship recipient and subsequently earned a diploma from the Schola Cantorum de Paris. In 1970, she attended courses at the Cologne Dance Academy in Germany, studying under Glen Tetley and Marija Churiel, and later in Essen with Pina Bausch.

== Career ==
=== Performance ===
Cezar began her career as a ballerina at the Romanian National Opera in Bucharest in 1957. In 1965, she participated as prima ballerina at the Champs-Élysées Festival in Paris in the world premiere of Le Marteau sans maître by Pierre Boulez.

=== Teaching ===
In 1967, Cezar became a professor at the Bucharest Choreography High School, where she taught classical ballet and modern dance. She trained generations of professionals including Vavara Ștefănescu, Răzvan Mazilu, Mihai Mihalcea, and Liliana Iorgulescu.

She completed the master choreographers course of the Romanian Council of Culture in 1983 and was a scholarship recipient at Rambert Dance Company in London in 1988. She received a British Council scholarship in 1990. From 1992 to 1994, she was a collaborating lecturer at the Academy of Theatre and Film in Bucharest, and from 2014 to 2020, she served as an associate professor at the Bucharest National University of Arts.

In 1988, she was invited to teach modern dance and choreography at the International Courses in Bari, Italy.

=== Contemp Dance Company ===
Cezar founded the Contemp dance group in 1973, with the first performance of the "Nocturne" series taking place at the Țăndărică Theatre in Bucharest.

In 1990, with the support of Andrei Pleșu, the Minister of Culture, the company became the first contemporary dance company with permanent artistic activity in Romania.

The company presented performances at major venues and festivals including the Romanian National Opera (1991–1992), the George Enescu Festival (1992, 1995), and the New York Public Library for the Performing Arts (1995). International tours included Israel, Italy, Austria, Germany, the United States (Lincoln Center, Washington D.C., Philadelphia), the United Kingdom (Edinburgh), and France (Paris, Dijon).

== Selected works ==
Cezar created choreography and directed performances at major Romanian institutions including the Romanian National Opera, the Oleg Danovski Classical and Contemporary Dance Theatre in Constanța, the Romanian National Opera, Cluj-Napoca, the Constantin Tănase Revue Theatre, and the Bulandra Theatre.

Selected choreographies and stage direction include:

- Nocturne (1973) – Țăndărică Theatre
- The Mountain (1977) – National Theatre in Piatra-Neamț, based on the play by D. R. Popescu
- The Tempest (1979) – Bulandra Theatre, directed by Liviu Ciulei
- The Unsetting Day and Alpha-Lyrae – Romanian National Opera, music by Corneliu Cezar
- Oedipus (1991–1992) – Romanian National Opera, directed by Cătălina Buzoianu
- Procrustes' Bed (1995) – Bulandra Theatre, directed by Cătălina Buzoianu
- Red and Black – Bucharest National Theatre, based on Stendhal
- Medea by Seneca – Bucharest National Theatre, directed by Laurențiu Azimioară

== Filmography ==
Throughout her career, Cezar collaborated with directors including Liviu Ciulei, Cătălina Buzoianu, Cornel Todea, Silviu Purcărete, and Iulian Mihu.

- The Sisters (1984)
- Season of Love (1987)

== Awards and honors ==
- 1982 – ATM Award for launching a new style in Romanian choreography
- 1984 – First Prize and Critics' Prize at the Rock Music Festival in Dresden, Germany
- 1985 – First Prize for choreography and training in the choreography high schools competition
- 1992 – Grand Prize at the first International Contemporary Dance Festival in Iași
- 1993 – UNICEF Prize for choreography at the second International Contemporary Dance Festival in Iași
- 1995 – Selected from 500 participants worldwide for performance direction and choreography in Denver, Colorado
- 1996 – Music Critics' Prize for the performance "Life, a Journey"
- 1997 – TVR Prize for original choreography
- 2000 – Grand Prize for choreography "5 Lyres" in Budapest, Hungary
- 2000 – Honorary Citizen of Lara Province, Venezuela
- 2016 – Prize from the National Dance Center Bucharest for creating alternative frameworks and encouraging young artists
- 2025 – Honorary Citizen of Călimănești (posthumous)

== Personal life ==
Cezar was married to composer Corneliu Cezar from 1964 to 1978. They had one daughter, architect Yvonne Cezar (later Yvonne Toader), and two grandchildren, Petru-Sebastian and Maria-Yaelle.
