= Ștefan Ciubotărașu =

Romanian actor

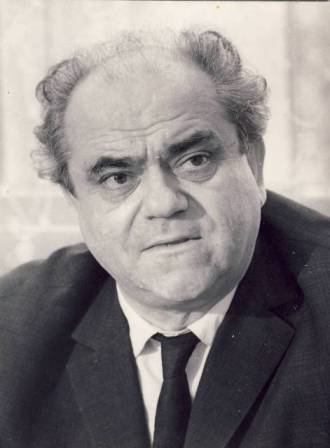
- Born: 21 March 1910; Lipovăț, Vaslui County, Kingdom of Romania
- Died: 27 August 1970 (aged 60); Bucharest, Socialist Republic of Romania
- Education: George Enescu National University of Arts
- Occupation: Actor
- Years active: 1934–1970
- Employer: National Theatre Bucharest

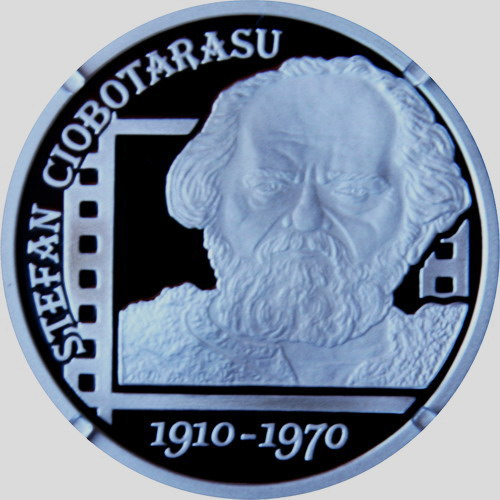
Commemorative silver coin issued by the National Bank of Romania in 2010 depicting Ștefan Ciubotărașu

Ștefan Ciubotărașu (Romanian pronunciation: [ʃteˈfan ˌtʃjubotəˈraʃu]; 21 March 1910 – 27 August 1970) was a Romanian actor. He appeared in more than thirty films from 1954 to 1970.

He was born into a poor farming family in Lipovăț, Vaslui County, a village in the Moldavia region of Romania. At the age of 10–11 he was sent by his family to Bucharest to become an apprentice shoemaker. In the fall of 1924 he decided to go back and study at the Mihail Kogălniceanu High School in Vaslui; he became interested in art, culture, and poetry and began to write. He then studied from 1929 to 1932 at the Academy of Music and Dramatic Art in Iași, after which he moved to Bârlad, where he wanted to establish himself as a theater actor. In 1934, with help from poet Mihai Codreanu, who taught at his old university and offered himself as a mentor, Ciubotărașu secured a job at the Conservatory theater in Iași. He debuted with the role of an assassin in Macbeth, and then played the role of Count Alexis Czerny in the play Ninotchka by Melchior Lengyel. Starting in 1945 he played at the Alhambra Theater and from 1950 at the National Theatre Bucharest.

From the mid-1950s, Ciubotărașu was also cast regularly in Romanian films. Notable were his portrayal of Petre in Liviu Ciulei's drama, The Forest of the Hanged (which competed at the 1965 Cannes Film Festival), and his role as the Dacian captain Ciungul in Mircea Drăgan's historical film, The Column.

In 1964 he was awarded the Order of Culture of Merit as People's Artist of the Romanian People's Republic "for outstanding work in the field of theater, music and visual arts" and in 1967 for "a lasting and outstanding achievement in dramatic art in the theater".

== Filmography ==
Year	Title	Role	Notes
1954	Brigada lui Ionuț		
1955	Desfășurarea	President of Sfatul Popular, Prunoiu	
1956	Mîndrie		
1957	Rîpa dracului	Manolache	
1957	Stormy Bird	Iordache	
1957	Erupția	Dobre	
1957	O mică întîmplare		
1959	Avalanșa		
1960	Telegrame	Cafegiul	
1960	Valurile Dunării		
1960	Furtuna		
1960	Thirst	Șofron	
1961	Portretul unui necunoscut	Barcagiul	
1962	Omul de lînga tine	Cartan	
1962	Porto-Franco		
1962	Celebrul 702		
1962	Cerul n-are gratii		
1963	Lupeni 29	Varga	
1963	A fost prietenul meu	Balaurul	
1963	La vîrsta dragostei	Bălan	
1963	Partea ta de vină		
1964	Străinul	worker Octavian Sabin	
1965	Forest of the Hanged	Petre	
1965	Neamul Șoimăreștilor	Nobleman Stroie Orheianu	
1965	Merii sălbatici		
1965	Amintiri din copilărie	Ion Creangă	
1966	Golgota		
1967	Diminețile unui băiat cuminte	Cioba	
1967	The Subterranean	Zamfir	
1967	Cerul începe la etajul III		
1968	The Column	Ciungul – Dacian Captain	
1968	Sîmbăta morților		
1969	Apoi s-a născut 'Legenda'	di Mare	
1970	Războiul domnițelor	Senrea	
1971	Așteptarea	Nea Fane	Final film role
