= Constantin Codrescu =

Romanian actor (1931–2022)

Constantin Codrescu Grand Cross and Sash ranks of the Order of the Star of Romania
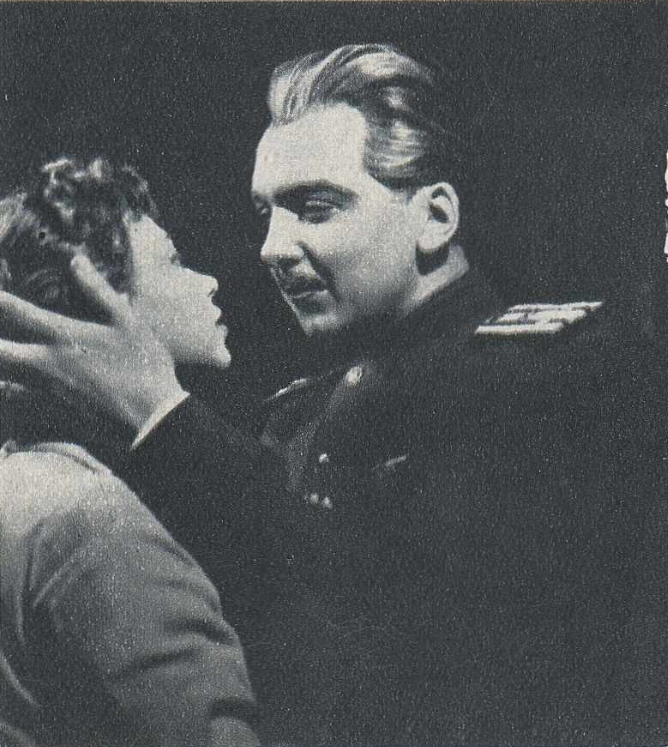
- Born: 5 September 1931; Huși, Kingdom of Romania
- Died: 13 November 2022 (aged 91); Bucharest, Romania
- Burial place: Snagov
- Other name: Constantin "Puiu" Codrescu
- Occupation: Actor
- Years active: 1953–2022
- Spouse(s): Valeria Gagialov; Marga Barbu; Adina Georgescu; Ildiko Codrescu
- Awards: Order of Cultural Merit

Constantin Codrescu (Romanian pronunciation: [konstanˈtiŋ koˈdresku]; 5 September 1931 – 13 November 2022) was a Romanian actor. He appeared in more than thirty films since 1953.

== Biography ==
Born in Huși, he was raised in northern Bukovina, but had to move to Bucharest after the region was annexed by the Soviet Union in 1940.

In the early 1950s he was married to actress Valeria Gagialov, but some strange circumstances involving his mother (who tried to poison his wife) led to divorce. Afterwards he was married for five years to actress Margareta-Yvonne Butuc (later known as Marga Barbu); after divorcing her in 1959, he married Adina Georgescu in 1963, but this marriage also did not last long. In 1972 he found employment at the Hungarian Theatre in Târgu Mureș, where he met and later married actress Ildiko Codrescu.

Codrescu died on 13 November 2022, at the age of 91.

== Filmography ==
Year	Title	Role	Notes
1953	The Bugler's Grandsons	Illes	
1954	The Sun Rises	Illes	
1956	Mîndrie		
1957	The Mill of Good Luck	Ghiță	
1962	Pustiul	Cardilogoui	
1963	Partea ta de vina	Banu	
1964	Strainul		
1965	The White Moor		
1966	Răscoala	Baloleanu	
1967	Zodia Fecioarei	Arghir	
1967	The Subterranean	Albu	
1971	Michael the Brave	Wallachian Prince Alexander the Bad	
1971	Haiducii lui Șaptecai	Lanuli	
1971	Zestrea domnitei Ralu	Ianuli	
1974	De buna voie si nesilit de nimeni		
1975	Evadarea	ofiterul roman Vlasceanu	
1975	Mastodontul	Enciu	
1975	Cercul magic	Mihai Onu	
1976	Bunicul si doi delincventi minori		
1976	Roscovanul	Florica Potra	
1977	Pentru patrie	C.A. Rosetti	
1979	Vlad Țepeș	Iunus Beg	
1979	Bietul Ioanide	Dinu Gaittani	
1980	La rascrucea marilor furtuni	Eliade-Radulescu	
1981	Capcana mercenarilor	Mayer	
1982	Trandafirul galben	Rosetti	
1985	The Silver Mask	Hellade	
1985	Sezonul pescarusilor		
1986	Colierul de turcoaze	Primul cauzas	
1986	Batalia din umbra	Mihai Cernalanu	
1986	Un oaspete la cina	profesorul Pandrea	
1987	Padurea de fagi		
1987	Totul se plateste	Eliade	
1989	Martori disparuti		
1989	Flori de gheata		
1989	Lacrima cerului		
1993	Doi haiduci si o crâsmarita		
1998	Train of Life	Sage 1	
2004	Magnatul		
2007	Daria, iubirea mea	Marcel	TV Series
2010	Moștenirea	Toni	TV Series
2014	The Lego Movie	Vitruvius	Romanian voice
2021	Pup-o, mă! 2: Mireasa nebună	The old peasant #2	
2021	Scara	Priest Necula	(final film role)
