= Haiducii (film) =

- Directed by: Dinu Cocea
- Starring: Ion Besoiu; Marga Barbu; Amza Pellea
- Release date: 21 April 1966 (Romania)
- Running time: 91 minutes
- Country: Romania
- Language: Romanian

Haiducii is a 1966 Romanian film directed by Dinu Cocea.

== Cast ==
- Ion Besoiu - căpetenia de haiduci Amza
- Marga Barbu - hangița Anița
- Amza Pellea - haiducul Sârbu
- Elisabeta Jar - Maria, fiica vel-vistiernicului Dudescu
- Toma Caragiu - haiducul Răspopitul
- Fory Etterle - domnitorul (creditat Fory Eterle)
- Ion Finteșteanu - Ahmed Pașa, trimisul sultanului
- Alexandru Giugaru - boierul Belivacă
- Florin Scărlătescu - vel-vistiernicul Dudescu
- Marin Moraru - haiducul Dascălu
- Mircea Sîntimbreanu - haiducul Zdrelea
- Constantin Guriță - Duduveică
- Ileana Buhoci-Gurgulescu - țiganca Fira (as Elena Buhoci)
- Jean Constantin - țiganul Parpanghel
- Colea Răutu - arnăut
