= Fory Etterle =

Romanian actor

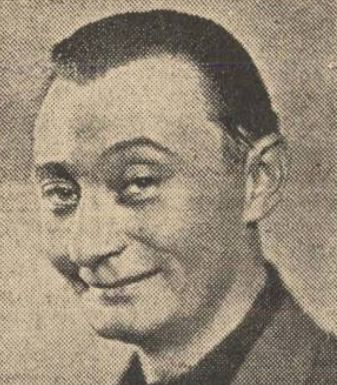
- Born: May 24, 1908; Ploiești, Kingdom of Romania
- Died: September 16, 1983 (aged 75); Bucharest, Socialist Republic of Romania
- Education: Conservatory of Dramatic Art, Bucharest
- Occupation: Actor
- Years active: 1951–1983 (film)
- Spouse: Marie-Jeanne Vizanti

Fory Etterle (Romanian pronunciation: [ˈfori ˈeterle]; 24 May 1908–16 September 1983) was a Romanian film actor.

== Biography ==
Born in Ploiești, he attended the city's Ion Luca Caragiale High School. After taking courses at the Faculty of Law of the University of Bucharest, he studied at the Conservatory of Dramatic Art in Bucharest under Lucia Sturdza-Bulandra, graduating in 1929.

== Selected filmography ==
- Life Triumphs (1951) - Tasca
- The Sun Rises (1954) - Procurorul
- Desfasurarea (1955) - chiaburul Iancu Enache
- Alarm in the Mountains (1955) - Stavrescu
- Stormy Bird (1957) - Emilian
- Telegrame (1960) - Ministru IV
- Baietii nostri (1960)
- Darclee (1961) - Gaillard
- Soldați fără uniformă (1961) - Diplomatul
- Portretul unui necunoscut (1961) - Valerian
- Porto-Franco (1961) - Doctor
- Celebrul 702 (1961) - Sullivan
- Lupeni 29 (1963) - Procurorul
- Tudor (1963) - Rasid Pasa
- Străinul (1964) - Parintele Potra
- Neamul Șoimăreștilor (1965) - Vladimir Coribut
- The White Moor (1965) - Verde Imparat
- Runda 6 (1965)
- The Lace Wars (1965) - col. Meinheim
- Haiducii (1966) - Domnitorul
- Dacii (1966) - Roman Emperor Domitian (voice)
- De trei ori Bucuresti (1967) - Elderly Man (segment "Bucuresti")
- Șeful sectorului suflete (1967) - the teacher who runs the chemistry lab (uncredited)
- The Last Roman (1968-1969, part 1, 2)
- Aventurile lui Tom Sawyer (1968) - advocate
- Moartea lui Joe Indianul (1968) - advocate
- Castelul condamnaților (1970) - General Schröder
- Michael the Brave (1971) - Pope Clement VIII
- Pentru că se iubesc (1972) - Presedintele tribunalului
- Tonight We'll Dance at Home (1972) - Bebe
- Conspiratia (1973) - Senator Salvator Varga
- Departe de Tipperary (1973) - Salvator Varga
- Capcana (1974) - Salvator Varga
- Hyperion (1975)
- Trei zile si trei nopti (1976)
- Intre oglinzi paralele (1978)
- Muntele alb (1978)
- Detasamentul 'Concordia' (1981) - Bijutierul
- O lebada, iarna (1983)
- Pe malul stîng al Dunarii albastre (1983) - Domnul Guy (final film role)
