= Life Triumphs =

Life Triumphs may refer to:

- Nahapet or Life Triumphs, a 1977 Armenian drama film
- Life Triumphs (1951 film), a 1951 Romanian drama film
