= The Subterranean =

1967 film

- Directed by: Virgil Calotescu
- Written by: Ioan Grigorescu
- Starring: Leopoldina Bălănuță
- Cinematography: Constantin Ionescu-Tonciu
- Release date: July 1967
- Running time: 97 minutes
- Country: Romania
- Language: Romanian

The Subterranean (Romanian: Subteranul) is a 1967 Romanian war film directed by Virgil Calotescu. It was entered into the 5th Moscow International Film Festival.

== Cast ==
- Leopoldina Bălănuță as Irina
- Geo Barton
- Mircea Bașta
- Emil Botta as Barbu
- Toma Caragiu as Florescu
- Ștefan Ciubotărașu as Zamfir
- Constantin Codrescu
- Iurie Darie as Mircea Tudoran
- Viorica Farkaș (as Viorica Farcas)
- Monica Ghiuță
- Dem Rădulescu
