= Marga Barbu =

Romanian actress

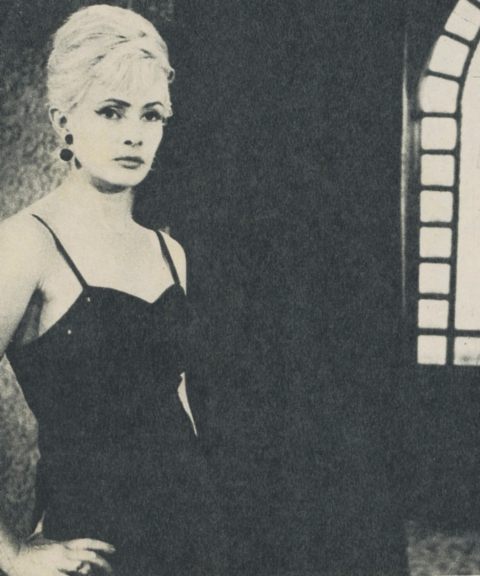
- Born: Margareta-Yvonne Butuc; 24 February 1929; Ocna Șugatag, Maramureș County, Kingdom of Romania
- Died: 31 March 2009 (aged 80); Bucharest, Romania
- Resting place: Bellu Cemetery, Bucharest
- Education: Caragiale Academy of Theatrical Arts and Cinematography
- Years active: 1953–1989
- Spouse(s): Constantin Codrescu; Eugen Barbu

Margareta-Yvonne Barbu also known as Marga Barbu born Margareta-Yvonne Butuc (24 February 1929 – 31 March 2009) was a Romanian actress.

She was born in 1929 in Ocna Șugatag, Maramureș County, and moved to Bucharest at age 14. In 1950 she graduated from the I.L. Caragiale Institute of Theatre and Film Arts. She was married to actor Constantin Codrescu, and then to writer Eugen Barbu. She died at the Floreasca Hospital in Bucharest in 2009 and was buried with military honors at Bellu Cemetery, next to her second husband, on Writer's Alley, close to Mihai Eminescu's resting place.

== Filmography ==
- Lacrimi de iubire (2005)... Polixenia
- Lacrima cerului (1989)
- Martori dispăruți (1988)
- Totul se plătește (1986)
- Colierul de turcoaze (1985) .... Agatha Slătineanu... a.k.a. The Turquoise Necklace
- Domnișoara Aurica (1985) .... Aurica
- Masca de argint (1985)... a.k.a. The Silver Mask
- Misterele Bucureștilor (1983) ... a.k.a. Die Gelbe Rose und das Geheimnis von Bucharest or The Mysteries of Bucharest (International: English title: informal literal title)
- Wilhelm Cuceritorul (1982)... a.k.a. Cucerirea Angliei (Romania) or Guillaume le conquérant (France) or William the Conqueror (USA)
- Trandafirul galben (1982) .... Agata Slatineanu... a.k.a. The Yellow Rose (International: English title: informal literal title)
- Drumul oaselor (1980) .... Agata Slatineanu
- Bietul Ioanide (1979)... a.k.a. Memories from an Old Chest of Drawers
- Omul care ne trebuie (1979)... a.k.a. The Man We Need
- Melodii, melodii... (1978)... a.k.a. Melodies, Melodies...
- Zile fierbinți (1976)... a.k.a. Hot Days
- Comoara din Carpați (1975) (TV)
- August în flăcări (1973) (TV)... a.k.a. August in Flames
- Tatăl risipitor (1973)... a.k.a. The Prodigal Father
- Ultimul cartuș (1973)... a.k.a. The Last Bullet
- La Révolte des Haîdouks (1972) TV series .... Anitza
- Dragostea începe vineri (1972)... a.k.a. Love Begins on Friday or Love Starts on Friday (International: English title: informal literal title)
- Facerea lumii (1971)... a.k.a. The Making of the World
- Saptamîna nebunilor (1971)... a.k.a. The Week of the Madmen
- Urmarirea (1971) TV series
- Haiducii lui Șaptecai (1970)... a.k.a. The Outlaws of Captain Anghel
- Zestrea domniței Ralu (1970)... a.k.a. The Dowry of Lady Ralu
- Răpirea fecioarelor (1968) .... Anița... a.k.a. The Abduction of the Maidens
- Răzbunarea haiducilor (1968) .... Anița... a.k.a. The Revenge of the Outlaws
- Amprenta (1967) .... Edith... a.k.a. Fingerprint
- Haiducii (1966)... a.k.a. The Outlaws
- La porțile pamîntului (1966)... a.k.a. At the Gates of the Earth
- Procesul alb (1965)... a.k.a. White Trial
- Pădurea spânzuraților (1964)... a.k.a. Forest of the Hanged or The Lost Forest
- Vultur 101 (1957) ... a.k.a. Eagle 101 (International: English title: informal literal title)
- Răsare soarele (1954)... a.k.a. The Sun Rises (USA)
- Nepoții gornistului (1953)... a.k.a. The Bugler's Grandsons
