= Margareta Pogonat =

Romanian actress

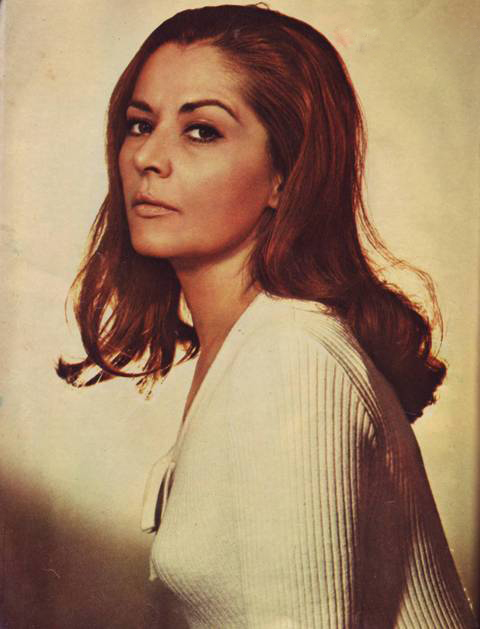
- Born: March 6, 1933; Iași, Kingdom of Romania
- Died: May 11, 2014 (aged 81); Bucharest, Romania
- Resting place: Iancu Nou Cemetery, Bucharest
- Education: I. L. Caragiale National University of Theatre and Film
- Occupations: Film and theater actress
- Years active: 1957–2009
- Employer: Spiru Haret University

Margareta-Caliopi Pogonat (6 March 1933 – 11 May 2014) was a Romanian theatre and film actress.

She was born in Iași. Her father, Alexandru Pogonat, was a journalist and poet who died in 1941 on the Eastern Front; her grandfather, Petru Pogonat, was a jurist who served as mayor of Iași in 1921. Margareta Pogonat studied at the I.L. Caragiale Institute of Theatre and Film Arts (IATC) in Bucharest, graduating in 1959. She made her debut as a student in 1957 with the movie Pasărea furtunii, and then acted at the Mihai Eminescu Theatre in Botoșani, the Iași National Theatre, and the Toma Caragiu Theatre in Ploiești. From 1974 to 1998 she played at the Nottara Theatre in Bucharest.

In 1990, she became a professor at Spiru Haret University, where she taught acting for 12 years. In 2009 she received a Lifetime Achievement Award from the Romanian Association of Theatre Artists. She died of cancer in Bucharest, at age 81, and was buried in the city's Iancu Nou Cemetery.

== Filmography ==
- Pasărea furtunii (1957)
- Două lozuri (1957)
- Lumină de iulie (1963)
- Amintiri din copilărie (1964)
- Meandre (1967)
- Apoi s-a născut legenda (1969)
- Tinerețe fără bătrânețe (1969)
- Orașul văzut de sus (1970)
- Dragostea începe vineri (1972)
- Drum în penumbră (1972)
- Papesa Ioana (1972)
- Zestrea (1972)
- Pistruiatul (1973) – TV series
- Când trăiești mai adevărat (TV) (1974)
- Trei scrisori secrete (1974)
- Orașul văzut de sus (1975)
- Actorul și sălbaticii (1975)
- Gloria nu cântă (1976)
- Pasărea speranței (TV) (1976)
- E atât de aproape fericirea (1977)
- Regăsirea (1977)
- Clipa (1979)
- Convoiul (1981)
- Lumini și umbre: Partea I (1981) – TV series
- Lumini și umbre: Partea II (1982) – TV series
- Crucea de piatră (1994)
- Gaițele (1993) – film TV
- Binecuvântata fii, închisoare (2002)
- Amantul marii doamne Dracula (2005) – TV series
- Cuscrele (2005) – (TV) – Rodica
- Om sărac, om bogat (2006) – (TV) – Paraschiva Prodan
- Margo (2006)
- Inimă de țigan (2007) – Tamara
- Regina (2008) – Afrodita
- Iubire și Onoare (2010) – Coco's grandmother
