= Alarm in the Mountains =

- Film poster
- Directed by: Dinu Negreanu
- Starring: Emanoil Petruț; Iurie Darie
- Cinematography: Alexandru Rosianu
- Release date: 1955
- Country: Romania
- Language: Romanian

Alarm in the Mountains (Romanian: Alarmă în munți) is a 1955 Romanian action film directed by Dinu Negreanu. In the Romanian countryside, the poor are threatened by bandits organised by the former owners of the lands who have been dispossessed by the communists. In a mountainous area, border guards are confronted by parachuted spies who want to recover and take over the border several secret documents of a forestry plant.

== Cast ==
- Mircea Albulescu
- Ion Anghel
- Romulus Bărbulescu as a spy
- Boris Ciornei as Lupan
- Liviu Ciulei as a spy
- Dana Comnea as Codița
- Iurie Darie as Grigore
- Fory Etterle as Stavrescu
- Jean Lorin Florescu
- Corneliu Gârbea as Bordea
- Titus Lapteș as Mitru
- Ion Lucian as Pavel
- Mihnea Moisescu
- Amza Pellea
- Emanoil Petruț as Mihai Durau
- Dem Savu as Păruș Vasile
- Aurelia Sorescu as Elena

== Welcoming ==
4,022,943 viewers watched the movie in the Romania's cinemas, as evidenced by a situation of the number of viewers recorded at the Romanian movies from the premiere date by December 31, 2014, made by the National Center of Cinematography.

== Bibliography ==
- Liehm, Mira & Liehm, Antonín J. The Most Important Art: Eastern European Film After 1945. University of California Press, 1977.
