= The Bugler's Grandsons =

1953 film by Dinu Negreanu

- Directed by: Dinu Negreanu
- Written by: Cezar Petrescu
- Cinematography: Ovidiu Gologan; Wilfried Ott
- Release date: 1953
- Country: Romania
- Language: Romanian

The Bugler's Grandsons (Romanian: Nepoții gornistulu) is a 1953 Romanian drama film directed by Dinu Negreanu. The film was shot at the Buftea Studios in Bucharest. It was the first in a two-part production portraying ordinary Romanian life of recent decades, covering the period between the Romanian War of Independence and the 1930s. It was followed by the sequel The Sun Rises in 1954.

== Cast ==
- Marga Barbu – Simina
- Andrei Codarcea – Pintea Dorobanțu
- Liviu Ciulei
- Constantin Codrescu – Ilieș
- Corina Constantinescu – Stanca Dorobanțu
- Iurie Darie – Miron
- Ernest Maftei
- Constantin Ramadan – Grigore Leahu
- George Vraca – Dobre Răcoviceanu

== Bibliography ==
- Liehm, Mira; Liehm, Antonín J. (1977). The Most Important Art: Eastern European Film After 1945. University of California Press. ISBN 9780520031579 – via Internet Archive.
