= Valeria Gagealov =

Romanian actress (1931–2021)

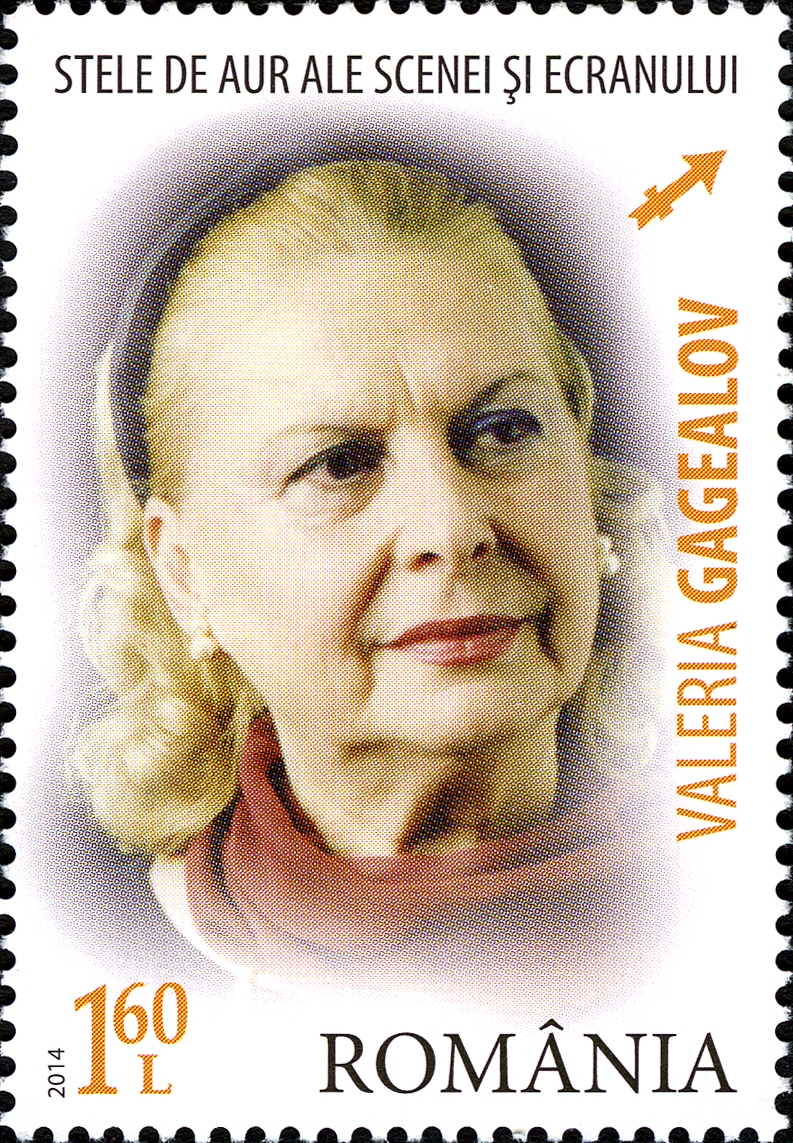
Valeria Gagealov on a 2014 Romanian stamp

Valeria Gagealov (9 December 1931 – 9 February 2021) was a Romanian film, radio, theater, television and voice actress.

== Biography ==
She was born in Galați, Romania, and studied at the Caragiale Academy of Theatrical Arts and Cinematography with Irina Răchițeanu-Șirianu, graduating in 1954. She then worked for many years at the National Theatre Bucharest, where she played Curley's wife in Of Mice and Men by John Steinbeck, and Sonia in Camera de alături by Paul Everac.

In the early 1950s, she was married to fellow actor Constantin Codrescu, but some strange circumstances involving his mother (who tried to poison Gagealov) led to divorce. Later on she married Andrei Magheru, a diplomat, and then followed him to Paris when he became Romania's ambassador to France in 1990.

In 2004, Gagealov was awarded the Order of Cultural Merit, Commander rank.

She died from COVID-19 at Elias Hospital in Bucharest on 9 February 2021, at the age of 89, during the COVID-19 pandemic in Romania.

== Filmography ==
Her filmography was the following:

- La Moara cu noroc (1955)
- Momente Caragiale - Tren de plăcere (1958)
- Mutter Courage (1962) - Yvette Pottier
- Columna (1968)
- Castelul condamnaților (1970)
- Mihai Viteazul (1971)
- Serata (1971)
- Puterea și adevărul (1972)
- Un august în flăcări (1973)
- Departe de Tipperary (1973)
- Când trăiești mai adevărat (1974)
- Singurătatea florilor (1976) - Ema
- Mihail, câine de circ (1979) - Mary Emory
- Bietul Ioanide (1980) - Doamna Lascaris
- Întoarcerea lui Vodă Lăpușneanu (1980)
- Ultima noapte de dragoste (1980)
- Promisiuni (1985)
- Inimă de țigan (2007)
