= Dinu Negreanu =

Romanian film director

- Born: 18 November 1917; Tecuci, Galați County, Romania
- Died: 14 November 2001 (aged 83); San Diego, California
- Occupation: Film director
- Years active: 1951–1957

Dinu Negreanu (18 November 1917 - 14 November 2001) was a Romanian film director.

== Filmography ==
- Life Triumphs (1951)
- The Bugler's Grandsons (1953)
- The Sun Rises (1954)
- Alarm in the Mountains (1955)
- Stormy Bird (1957)
