= Eugen Barbu =

Romanian writer, journalist (1924–1993)

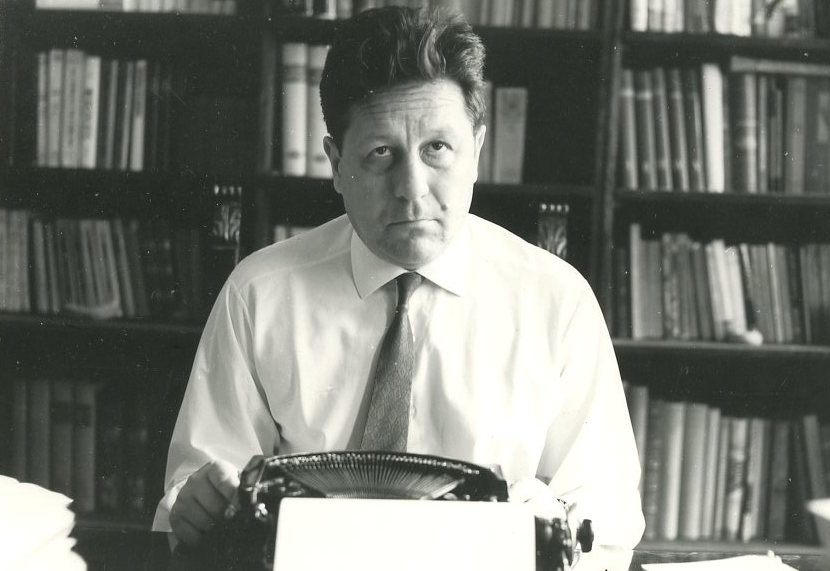
- Born: 20 February 1924; Bucharest, Kingdom of Romania
- Died: 7 September 1993 (aged 69); Bucharest, Romania
- Resting place: Bellu Cemetery, Bucharest
- Occupations: Novelist, short story writer, screenwriter, journalist
- Spouse: Marga Barbu
- Writing career
- Period: 1955–1993
- Genres: historical novel, fiction
- Movements: Realism, neorealism

Eugen Barbu (Romanian pronunciation: [e.uˈdʒen ˈbarbu]; 20 February 1924 – 7 September 1993) was a Romanian modern novelist, short story writer, journalist, and correspondent member of the Romanian Academy.

His most famous writings are the novels Groapa (1957) and Principele (1969). Barbu's prose, in which the influence of neorealism has been noted, drew comparison to the works of Mateiu Caragiale, Tudor Arghezi, and Curzio Malaparte. It was however, considered unequal by several critics, who took into measure Barbu's preference for archaisms, as well as his fluctuating narrative style. He was accused of having committed plagiarism in his novel Incognito.

Barbu also wrote several film scripts, some of which were for films starring his wife, the actress Marga Barbu (Florin Piersic's Mărgelatu series).

He founded and led the newspaper Săptămâna with a national communist editorial line from 1970 to 1989. In 1990, he founded, alongside his disciple Corneliu Vadim Tudor, the nationalist magazine România Mare, and in 1991, the two also founded a political party with a corresponding political alignment, the Greater Romania Party (PRM).. Both publications expressed antisemitic views.

== Biography ==
=== Early life and literature ===
The son of writer and journalist N. Crevedia, Barbu was born in Bucharest, and briefly attended the University of Bucharest's Faculty of Law, and then graduated from the Faculty of Letters (1947); he subsequently worked as a journalist for the left-wing press. Attending meetings of the Sburătorul society, he made his debut in 1955 (with the novella Munca de jos). The following year, he published his first novel, Balonul e rotund.

One of the few persons trusted with official criticism on both political and literary issues during the communist regime — under Gheorghe Gheorghiu-Dej, and especially under Nicolae Ceaușescu — he was noted for his early writings in praise of Soviet achievements such as the Sputnik program, and his progressive move to a more nationalist tone as this became condoned (and later encouraged). He was also involved in the censorship apparatus, a position which, some have argued, he used indiscriminately against his literary rivals.

=== Official appointments ===
His Principele novel, set during the Phanariote era, was interpreted to be an ironic reference to Gheorghiu-Dej's rule and the labor camps of the Danube–Black Sea Canal, and was condoned by the regime during a period of relative liberalization — cut short by the July Theses of 1971. At the time, he was also an editor of Luceafărul, before being dismissed following his prolonged and notorious conflicts with younger writers (while the regime was interested in ensuring the latter's confidence). Barbu was an informal envoy to the United States during the late 1960s, visiting the influential exiled scholar Mircea Eliade at his home in Chicago, unsuccessfully calling for his return, and vouching for a "magnificent reception" to his home country (in order to mark the potential image coup).

He was several times elected to the Great National Assembly, until the plagiarism scandal prevented him from being again proposed for the office. In 1977, Barbu won the Herder Prize, which permitted him to offer his protégé Tudor a scholarship year in Vienna.

=== Plagiarism scandal and Săptămâna ===
In 1979, România Literară published a special section in which it placed side by side a text from Incognito and one taken from a translated work by the Soviet writer Konstantin Paustovsky; the two sections were considered virtually identical. The ensuing scandal animated the literary world, and has often been cited as a reference for similar and more recent controversies. Speaking at the time, Barbu dismissed the accusations as character assassination.

During the 1970s and '80s, he notably launched verbal attacks against Romanian intellectuals who had defected the country, as well as against writers who were critical of the regime (the latter included Paul Goma, whom, in 1977, he called "a non-entity").

Barbu's polemic articles were often obscene in tone, and their message offered Ceauşescu a nationalist support which Vladimir Tismăneanu has identified as "chauvinistic". By 1980, Tudor's editorials in Săptămâna drew complaints from members of the Jewish-Romanian community; consequently, Barbu and Tudor came under the attention of the Securitate. According to Ziua, a Securitate file of the time reveals that the two had begun questioning the détente between Romania and the United States, contradicting official policy, and theorizing that the Most favored nation status, which Romania had just received, was actually harming the country (while arguing that data to prove this had been kept hidden by a Jewish plot).

Many attacks focused on Monica Lovinescu, who was broadcasting anti-communist messages on Radio Free Europe — in one instance during 1987, Barbu used his column in Săptămâna to belittle the work of Eugen Lovinescu, a major literary critic who was Monica Lovinescu's father; this drew criticism from the Romanian Communist Party (of which Barbu was a member) and alarm from the Securitate, as it went against more restrained official guidelines regarding the works of Eugen Lovinescu.

=== Post-Revolution ===
After the Romanian Revolution of 1989, Barbu and Tudor emerged as ideologists of a new nationalist trend, which largely repeated themes present in previous official discourse, while casting aside references to communism. Between 1992 and the time of his death, Barbu served in the Romanian Chamber of Deputies as representative of the Greater Romania Party for Bucharest.

In early 2005, eleven years after his death, the satirical magazine Academia Cațavencu uncovered and publicized a Securitate file which seems to indicate that Barbu had sexual encounters with underage girls, provided by Tudor and paid for their services. Tudor initially called on the National Council for the Study of the Securitate Archives to explain if the find was real, and received a positive answer. He later vehemently dismissed the allegations, indicating that virtually all of the girls' personal data was not found in census records, and that Anita Barton, the only one of them to have actually been found, was aged 19 at the time of her alleged meeting with Barbu.

He died in Bucharest in 1993 and was buried at Bellu Cemetery, on Writer's Alley, close to Mihai Eminescu's resting place. His wife, Marga Barbu, was buried next to him when she died in 2009.
