= The Mill of Good Luck =

1955 film

- Directed by: Victor Iliu
- Written by: Titus Popovici; Alexandru Struțeanu
- Story by: Ioan Slavici
- Starring: Constantin Codrescu; Geo Barton; Ioana Bulcă; Colea Răutu; Olga Tudorache
- Cinematography: Ovidiu Gologan
- Edited by: Emanuela Libros
- Music by: Paul Constantinescu
- Release date: 1955
- Running time: 114 minutes
- Country: Romania
- Language: Romanian

The Mill of Good Luck (Romanian: La 'Moara cu noroc') is a 1955 Romanian drama film directed by Victor Iliu. It was entered into the 1957 Cannes Film Festival. It is a version of the novella Moara cu noroc ("The lucky mill"), published in the collection Nuvele din popor (1881) by Ioan Slavici.

== Cast ==
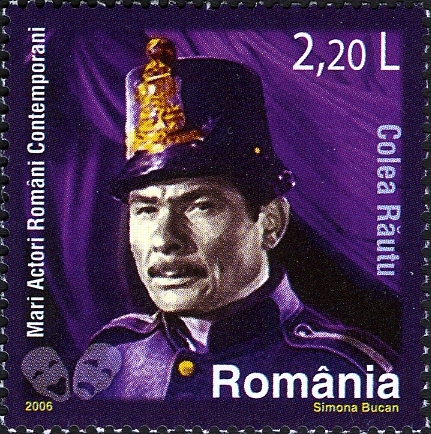
Colea Răutu as the gendarme Pintea.

- Constantin Codrescu – Ghiță, the innkeeper
- Geo Barton – Lică Sămădăul, chief of the swineherds
- Ioana Bulcă (as Ioana Bulcă-Diaconescu) – Ana, Ghiță's wife
- Colea Răutu – Pintea, the gendarme
- Marietta Rareș – the old woman (as Marieta Rareș)
- Gheorghe Ghițulescu – Răut
- Benedict Dabija – Buză Ruptă ("Split Lip")
- I. Atanasiu-Atlas – Saila Boarul
- Willy Ronea – the commissar
- Valeria Gagialov – the lady in mourning
- Sandu Sticlaru – Martzi, the inn hand
- Aurel Cioranu – Lae
- George Manu (as G. Manu)

== See also ==
- Orizont (2015 film)
