= Moldpres =

- Company type: Not-for-profit cooperative
- Industry: news agency
- Founded: 1940
- Headquarters: Chişinău, Moldova
- Services: News media
- Number of employees: 100
- Website: moldpres.md

The state news agency Moldpres is a non-budgetary, self-financing organization founded by the government of the Republic of Moldova.

== Overview ==
According to its official website, Moldpress has three main activities: disseminating news stories, photo chronicles, and issuing the Monitorul Oficial, the official publication of Moldovan laws. It is located in Chişinău, Moldova on 22, Puskin str.

The institution has just over 100 employees and owns a press centre with a conference hall. Since July 2004, the agency has seven departments: News, the Monitorul Oficial, Finance, Marketing, Technology and Photo Services, Polygraphy, and Management.

In November 2009, Vladimir Darie replaced Valeriu Reniţă as director of Moldpres.

As part of the expansion of an international collaboration network, Moldpres signed a partnership agreement with the Agenzia Nazionale Stampa Associata of Italy in February 2023.
