= Dobroteasa =

- Commune
- Seal

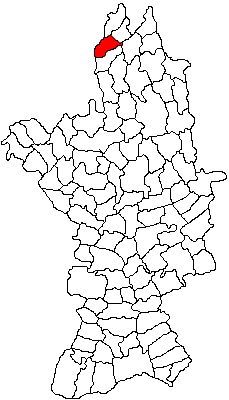
- Location in Olt County

- Location in Romania
- Coordinates: 44°47′N 24°23′E
- Country: Romania
- County: Olt
- Population (2021-12-01): 1,502
- Time zone: UTC+02:00 (EET)
  - Summer (DST): UTC+03:00 (EEST)
- Vehicle reg.: OT

Dobroteasa is a commune in Olt County, Muntenia, Romania. It is composed of four villages: Batia, Câmpu Mare, Dobroteasa, and Vulpești.

== Natives ==
- Virgil Calotescu
