= Stormy Bird =

- Directed by: Dinu Negreanu
- Written by: Petru Dumitriu
- Cinematography: Andrei Feher
- Music by: Edgar Cosma
- Release date: 27 June 1957
- Running time: 101 minutes
- Country: Romania
- Language: Romanian
- Budget: 5,743,000 lei

Stormy Bird (Romanian: Pasărea furtunii) is a 1957 Romanian drama film directed by Dinu Negreanu. The film portrays the lives of Black Sea fisherman during the Second World War and then in the years following the Communist takeover.

== Cast ==
- Mircea Albulescu as Adam Jora
- Marcel Anghelescu
- Costache Antoniu
- Ștefan Ciubotărașu as Dobre
- George Demetru
- Fory Etterle
- Margareta Pogonat as Uliana
- Paul Sava
- Boris Ciornei as Simion
- Sandina Stan

== Production ==
Filming took place in the summer and autumn of 1956, with exterior shots in Mamaia-Sat and Ovidiu; interior shots in Buftea. Production costs amounted to 5,743,000 lei.

== Reception ==
The film was seen by 1,799,445 viewers in cinemas in Romania, as attested by a situation of the number of viewers recorded by Romanian films from the date of premiere until December 31, 2014 compiled by the National Center of Cinematography.

== Bibliography ==
- Liehm, Mira; Liehm, Antonín J. (1977). The Most Important Art: Eastern European Film After 1945. University of California Press. ISBN 9780520031579 – via Internet Archive.
