= George Vraca =

Romanian actor

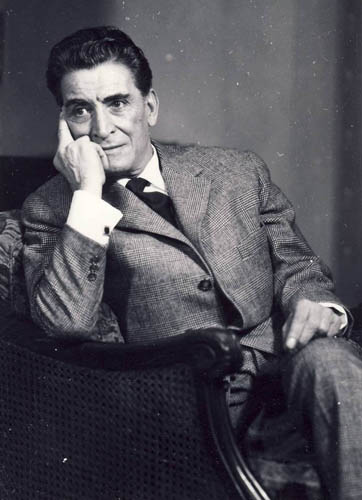
- Born: November 25, 1896; Bucharest, Kingdom of Romania
- Died: April 17, 1964 (aged 67); Bucharest, Romanian People's Republic
- Resting place: Sfânta Vineri Cemetery, Bucharest
- Occupation: Actor
- Years active: 1926–1963 (film)

George Vraca (Romanian pronunciation: [ˈdʒe̯ordʒe ˈvraka]; 1896–1964) was a Romanian stage and film actor.

Born in Bucharest, he attended the city's Matei Basarab High School. He then studied at the Music and Drama Conservatory under the guidance of actor Nicolae Soreanu.

Vraca died in Bucharest at age 64, and was buried in the city's Sfânta Vineri Cemetery; his grave was declared a monument istoric in 2004. A street in Sector 1 of Bucharest bears his name.

== Selected filmography ==
- Datorie și sacrificiu (1926)
- Se aprind făcliile (1939)
- Life Triumphs (1951)
- The Bugler's Grandsons (1953)
- The Sun Rises (1954)
- Tudor (1963)

== Bibliography ==
- Goble, Alan. The Complete Index to Literary Sources in Film. Walter de Gruyter, 1999.
