= Iurie Darie =

Romanian actor

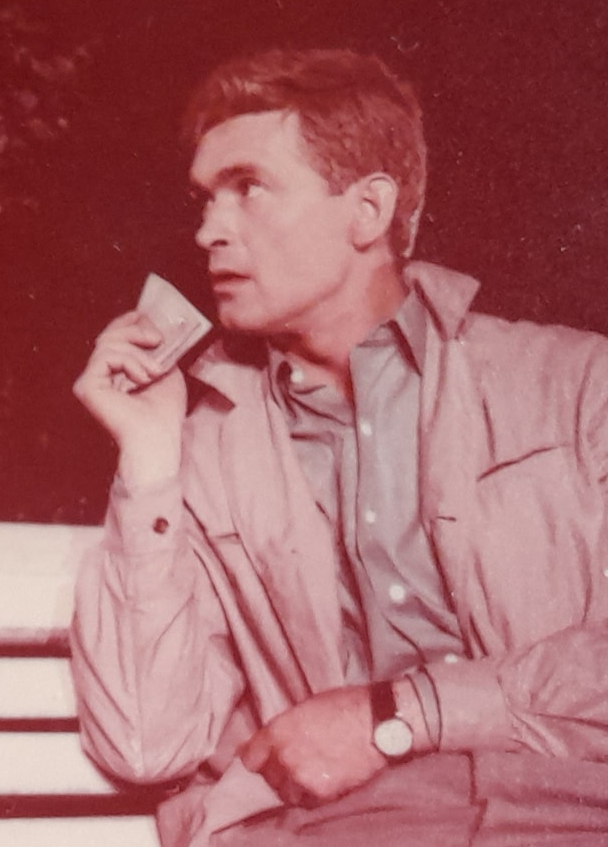
- Darie in 1962
- Born: Iurie Darie-Maximciuc; 14 March 1929; Vadul-Rașcov, Soroca County, Kingdom of Romania
- Died: 9 November 2012 (aged 83); Bucharest, Romania
- Resting place: Sfânta Vineri Cemetery, Bucharest
- Education: Caragiale Academy of Theatrical Arts and Cinematography
- Occupation: Actor
- Spouse(s): Consuela Roșu; Anca Pandrea
- Children: Alexandru Darie
- Awards: National Order of Faithful Service

Iurie Darie (Romanian pronunciation: [ˈjuri.e ˈdari.e]; 14 March 1929 – 9 November 2012) was a Romanian actor.

== Biography ==
Darie was born in Vadul-Rașcov, Soroca County, Kingdom of Romania. He studied at the Academy of Theatrical Arts and Cinematography in Bucharest, graduating in 1952. He made his film debut in 1953, playing Miron in The Bugler's Grandsons.

In 2002, Darie received the National Order of Faithful Service with the rank of Knight for his prestigious artistic career.

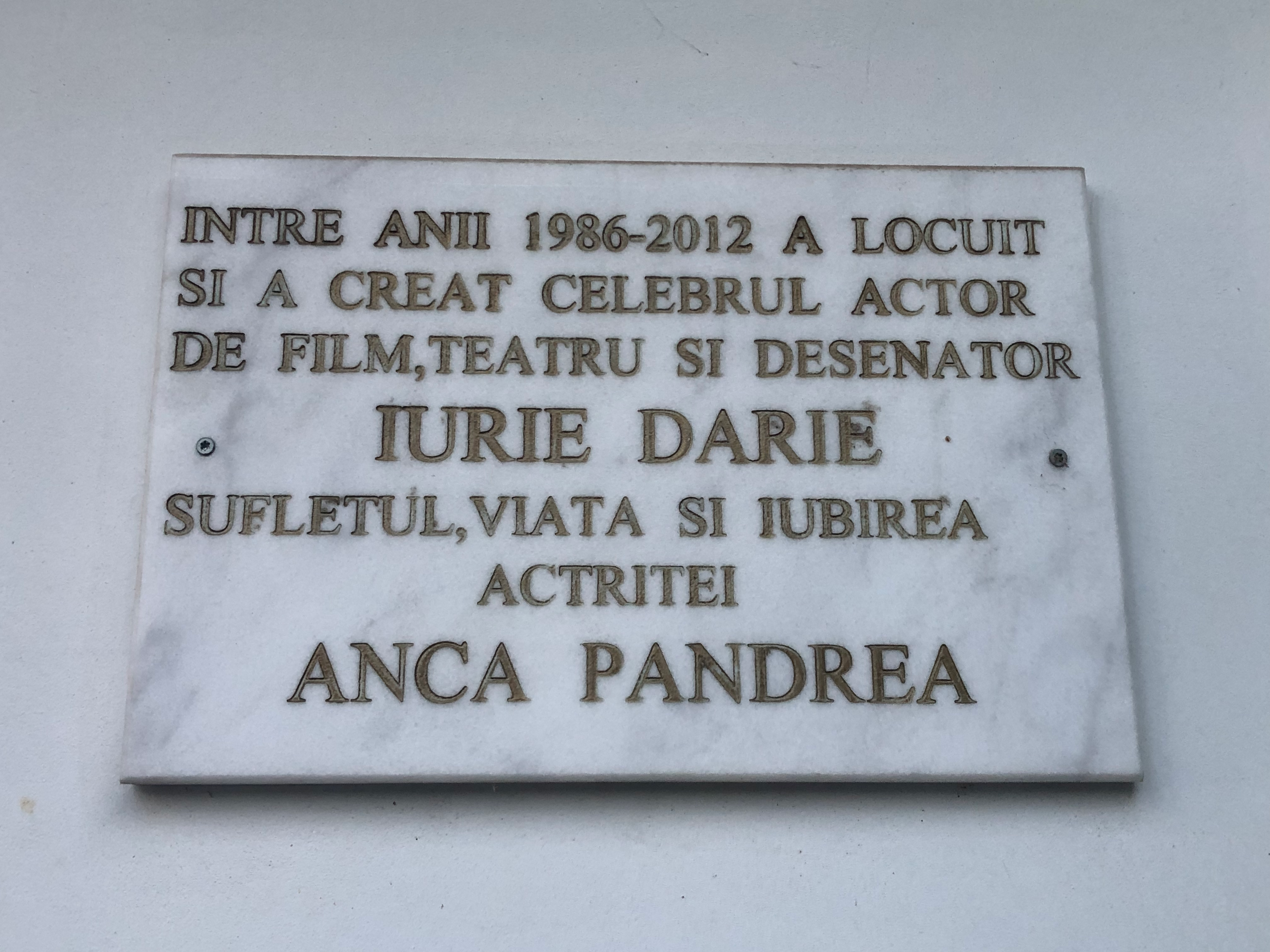
Plaque on the house where Darie lived from 1986 to 2012

During his last years Darie suffered from several health problems, including respiratory and cardiac insufficiency and also a stroke. He died on 9 November 2012, aged 83, in Bucharest, surrounded by his family. He was buried in the city's Sfânta Vineri Cemetery.

== Filmography ==
- The Bugler's Grandsons (1953) - Miron
- The Sun Rises (1954) - Miron
- Directorul nostru (1955)
- Blanca (1955)
- Alarm in the Mountains (1955) - Grigore
- Pe răspunderea mea (1956) - Dinu
- Alo?... Ați greșit numărul! (1958) - student Victor Mancaș
- Băieții noștri (1960) - Dinu Almajan
- A Bomb Was Stolen (1962) - Man
- Post restant (1962) - Puiu Crintea
- Vacanță la mare (1963) - Stadion
- Pisica de mare (1964) - Radu
- Dragoste la Zero Grade (1964) - Andrei
- Mofturi 1900 (1964)
- Calea Victoriei sau cheia visurilor (1965) - Mirel Alcaz
- Procesul alb (1966) - Matei
- Faust XX (1966) - Toma, the assistant
- The Subterranean (1967) - Mircea Tudoran
- A Woman for a Season (1969) - Filip Palaloga
- Cenata na gradot (1970) - Oto Horst
- Brigada Diverse intră în acțiune (1970) - Major Dobrescu
- Signale - Ein Weltraumabenteuer (1970) - Commander
- B.D. în alertă - Profesorul de mimică (1970) - Major Dobrescu
- Osceola (1971) - Richard Moore
- Brigada Diverse în alertă! (1971) - Major Dobrescu
- B.D. la munte și la mare (1971) - Major Dobrescu
- B.D. în alerta - Văduve cu termen redus (1971) - Major Dobrescu
- Then I Sentenced Them All to Death (1972) - activist, the student's brother
- Cantemir (1973) - Mihuț Gălățeanu / Miguel São Miguel
- Frații Jderi (1974) - Simion Jder
- Stephen the Great - Vaslui 1475 (1975) - Nobleman Simion Jder
- Blood Brothers (1975) - Bill Simmons
- Mușchetarul român (1975) - Colonel Mihuț Gălățeanu / Captain Miguel São Miguel
- Serenadă pentru etajul XII (1976) - Off Duty Cop
- Misterul lui Herodot (1976)
- Pentru patrie (1977) - Major Gheorghe Șonțu
- Buzduganul cu trei peceți (1977) - Sigismund Báthory
- Severino (1978)
- Revanșa (1978)
- Cianura... și picătura de ploaie (1978) - Robert Rădulescu
- Ein April hat 30 Tage (1979) - Alvaro
- Am fost șaisprezece (1979) - Major Marinescu
- Drumul oaselor (1980) - Boyar Pană
- Sing, Cowboy, sing (1981) - Dave Arnold
- Viraj periculos (1983) - Lt. col. Mihai Mihnea
- The Ring (1984) - The Bio-Aktiv company representative
- Rămășagul (1984) - Thief
- Galax, omul păpușă (1984) - Professor
- Cucoana Chirița (1986)
- Cale liberă (1986)
- În fiecare zi mi-e dor de tine (1988) - The Director
- Moara (1990)
- Oglinda (1994) - General Constantin Sănătescu
- Punctul zero (1996) - General Victor Stănculescu
- Triunghiul morții (1999)
- Numai iubirea (2004, TV Series) - Nichifor Dogaru (final appearance)
