= Liviu Ciulei =

Romanian architect, actor, director, and designer

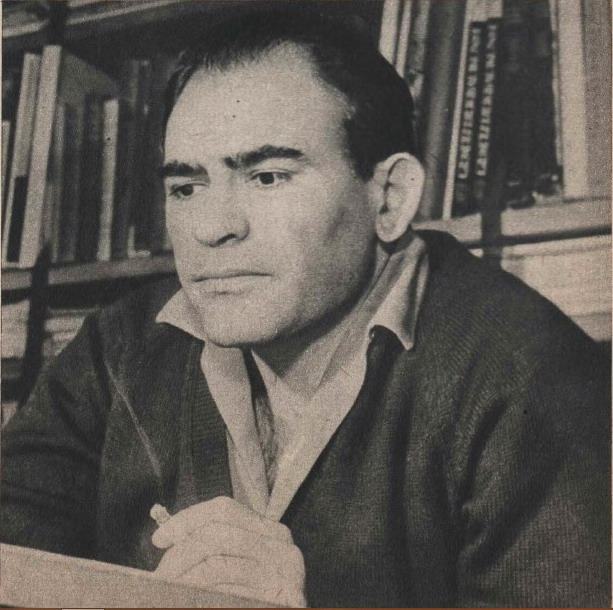
- Liviu Ciulei in 1963
- Born: 7 July 1923; Bucharest, Kingdom of Romania
- Died: 24 October 2011 (aged 88); Munich, Germany
- Education: Royal Conservatory of Music and Theatre
- Employer(s): Teatrul Bulandra; Guthrie Theater; Columbia University; New York University
- Known for: Best Director Award at the 1965 Cannes Film Festival
- Notable work: Forest of the Hanged
- Spouse(s): Clody Bertola; Ioana Gărdescu; Helga Reiter
- Children: Thomas Ciulei
- Father: Liviu Ciulley
- Awards: Order of the Star of Romania

Liviu Ciulei (Romanian pronunciation: [ˈlivju tʃjuˈlej]; 7 July 1923 – 24 October 2011) was a Romanian theater and film director, film writer, actor, architect, educator, costume and set designer. During a career spanning over 50 years, he was described by Newsweek as "one of the boldest and most challenging figures on the international scene".

Ciulei is known for winning the Best Director Award at the 1965 Cannes Film Festival for his film Forest of the Hanged. In 1992 he was elected corresponding member of the Romanian Academy. He received a star on the Romanian Walk of Fame in Bucharest on 13 December 2012.

== Biography ==
Born in Bucharest to Liviu Ciulley [sic], a lawyer and constructor, he studied at the Gheorghe Lazăr High School. Ciulei then studied architecture and theater at the Royal Conservatory of Music and Theatre. He made his theater debut in 1946, as Puck in an Odeon Theatre production of Shakespeare's A Midsummer Night's Dream. Soon after, he joined the theater company known as Teatrul Municipal din București, later renamed Teatrul Bulandra, and directed his first stage production in 1957 – The Rainmaker.

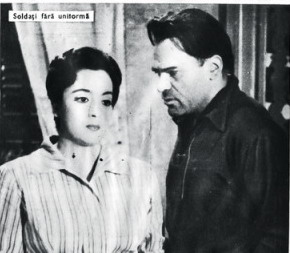
Ciulei acting in Soldați fără uniformă in 1960

In 1961, Ciulei gained an overall recognition for his version of Shakespeare's As You Like It. In the same year, he was a member of the jury at the 2nd Moscow International Film Festival. He was the recipient of the Directors' Award at the 1965 Cannes Film Festival for Forest of the Hanged, the film version of Liviu Rebreanu's eponymous novel, where he also starred in the role of Otto Klapka. In the 1980s, he was marginalized by the Communist regime and transferred to work at the Sahia film studio, as documentary filmmaker.

Ciulei was the artistic director of Teatrul Bulandra for more than a decade. During his tenure at the Bulandra he staged a wide range of classics. His Shakespeare productions include "As You Like it" "Macbeth" and "The Tempest", which was awarded Romania's Critics' Prize for Best Production of 1979. Also at the Bulandra, he staged such European classics as Maxim Gorky's "The Lower Depths" and "The Children of the Sun", Georg Büchner's "Danton's Death" and "Leonce and Lena", and Bertolt Brecht's "Threepenny Opera". His productions of American classics include Tennessee Williams' "A Streetcar Named Desire", William Saroyan's "The Time of Your Life", and Eugene O'Neill's "Long Day Journey into Night". Ciulei was a guest director in many theaters around the world: in West Berlin, Paris, Göttingen, Düsseldorf, Munich, and Vancouver. In Sydney, he won the 1977 Australian Critics'Award for his production of "The Lower Depths". In 1974 he made his American debut at the Arena Stage in Washington, D.C., as director and designer with "Leonce and Lena". In 1980 he directed and created sets for Dmitri Shostakovich's opera "Lady Macbeth of Mtsensk" at the Spoleto Festival in Italy: and in May 1982, he redirected the same opera for the Lyric Opera of Chicago. Between 1980 and 1985, he was the artistic director of the Guthrie Theater in Minneapolis. At the Guthrie he directed "The Tempest", "Eve of Retirement", "As You Like it", "Requiem for a Nun", "Peer Gynt", "The Threepenny Opera", "Three Sisters", "Twelfth Night", and "A Midsummer Night's Dream", among others.

From 1986 to 1990, Ciulei taught theater direction at Columbia University in New York, in the MFA program in theatre arts. Later, New York University made him a better offer to teach graduate acting, and he accepted an appointment at the university from 1991 to 1995.

After the Romanian Revolution of 1989, back in his native Romania, Ciulei directed a series of stage productions that were both publicly and critically acclaimed. He was named Honorary Director of the theater he has always loved the most, Bulandra. Besides being the costume and set designer of the majority of his own productions, Ciulei, as an architect, contributed to the rebuilding of the auditorium of the Bulandra Theatre.

== Family ==
He was first married to actress Clody Bertola, and then to scenographer Ioana Gărdescu. He remarried, to German journalist Helga Reiter, whose son from a previous marriage (Thomas Ciulei, now a film director) he adopted.

== Death ==
Ciulei died on 24 October 2011 in a hospital in Munich, aged 88; he had been suffering from multiple illnesses. His body was cremated, and the subject was brought up in television debates regarding Sergiu Nicolaescu's cremation in 2013 as to how the act of cremation is not sanctioned by the Romanian Orthodox Church.

== Filmography ==
- În sat la noi (1951) as Dumitru
- Mitrea Cocor (1951, writer)
- Nepoții gornistului (1953, writer) as Bulldogul
- Răsare soarele (1954, writer) as Bulldogul
- Alarmă în munți (1955)
- Pasărea furtunii (1957, writer)
- Erupția (1957, director)
- Valurile Dunării (1960, director) as Mihai
- Soldați fără uniformă (1960) as Bogdan
- Cerul n-are gratii (1962)
- Pădurea spânzuraților (1965, director) as Captain Otto Klapka
- Decolarea (1971) as Old pilot Barcan
- Facerea lumii (1971, writer) as Manicatide
- Dragostea începe vineri (1972)
- Ceața (1973) as Comisarul șef
- Dimitrie Cantemir (1973)
- Mușchetarul român (1975) as Leibnitz
- Mastodontul (1975) as Vogoride
- O scrisoare pierdută (1977, writer/director)
- Falansterul (1979) as Dinicu Golescu (final film role)

== Sources ==
- Miruna Runcan, Teatralizarea si reteatralizarea teatrului in Romania. 1920–1960, Cluj, Editura Eik0n, seria Bibilioteca teatrul Imposibil, 2003
