= Lucia Sturdza-Bulandra =

Romanian actress and acting teacher

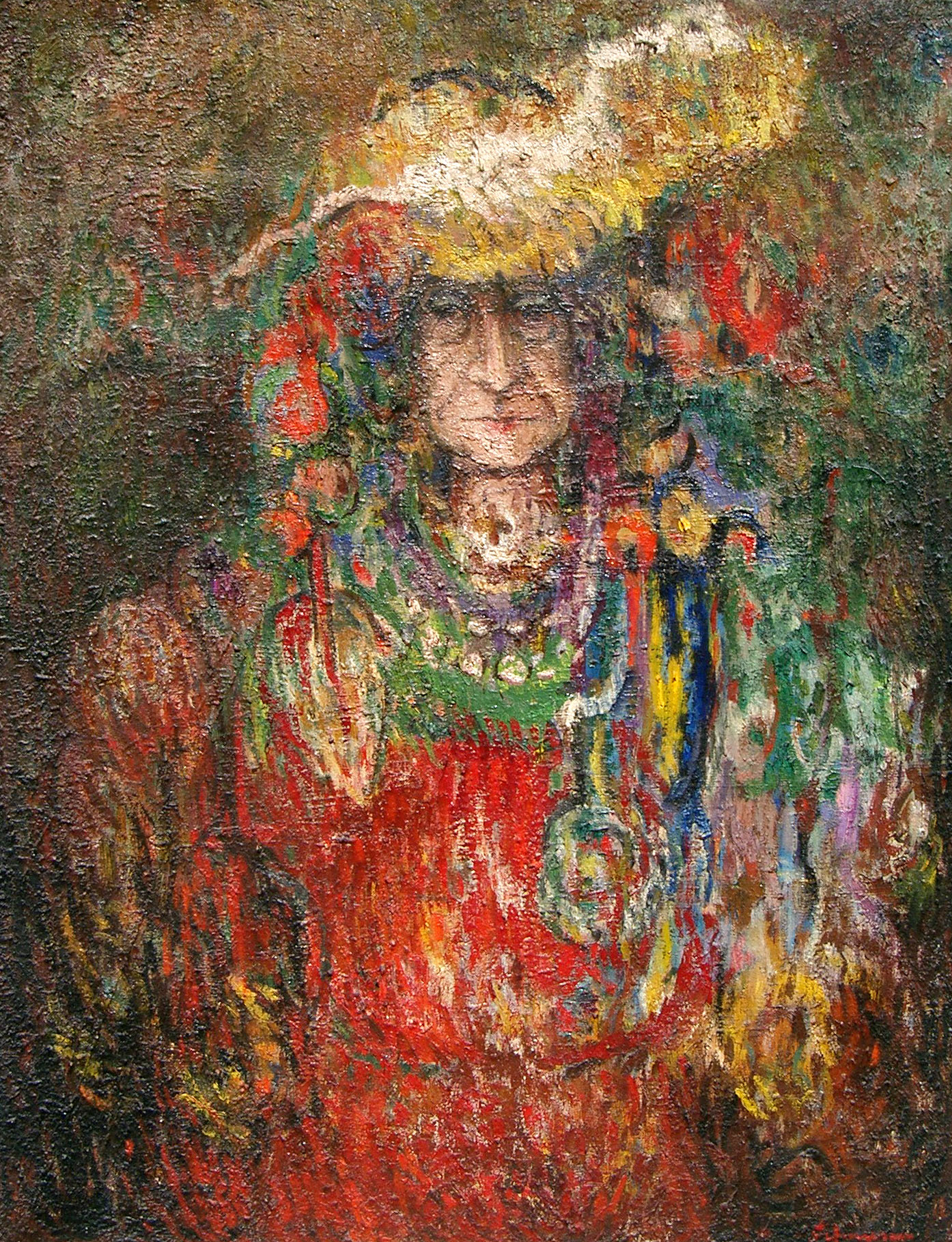
Portrait of Lucia Sturdza-Bulandra by George Ștefănescu

Lucia Sturdza-Bulandra (25 August 1873 – 19 September 1961) was a Romanian actress and acting teacher. She is widely regarded as one of the most important figures in the history of Romanian theater.

In addition to her acting career, she played an important role in shaping an entire generation of Romanian actors and directors, her students including the likes of George Calboreanu, Dina Cocea, Haig Acterian, Radu Beligan and Victor Rebengiuc. She is the namesake of the Bulandra Theatre in Bucharest.

== Early life ==
She was born on 25 August 1873 in Iași, the daughter of Emil Sturdza and Magda (nee Diamandy). She was a descendant of the aristocratic Sturdza family, which held great political power in Moldavia and later Romania.

She initially planned to pursue a career in education, but after graduating from the faculty of Letters and Philosophy of the University of Bucharest, she became interested in acting. She was forbidden from using her family name in the theater by her paternal grandparents, but ignored the order.

== Career ==
Bulandra Theatre in Bucharest

She made her stage debut in 1898, at the National Theatre Bucharest, in Édouard Pailleron's play Pendant le bal. Soon afterwards, she joins the Bucharest Conservatoire, studying under Aristizza Romanescu.

In 1914 she started her own private theater company, the Queen Maria Theatre, alongside her husband, Tony Bulandra. In 1941, with Romania joining World War II, her company was disbanded. The following years were hard, being characterized by unemployment, poverty, and the death of Tony in 1943.

In 1947 she joins the newly reopened Municipal Theater in Bucharest and acts as its director until her death in 1961. During her tenure as director, the "Municipal" grew from a small company of just nine performs to one of Bucharest's foremost theatrical institutions. After her death, the theater was renamed in her honour and is now known as the Bulandra Theatre.

Sturdza-Bulandra was awarded the Benemerenti medal, 1st class; the Order of Cultural Merit (Romania), 1st and 2nd class; the Order of the White Eagle (Serbia); the Labor Order (Romania), 1st class; and the Order of the Star of the Romanian People's Republic, 1st class (1953).

== Personal life ==
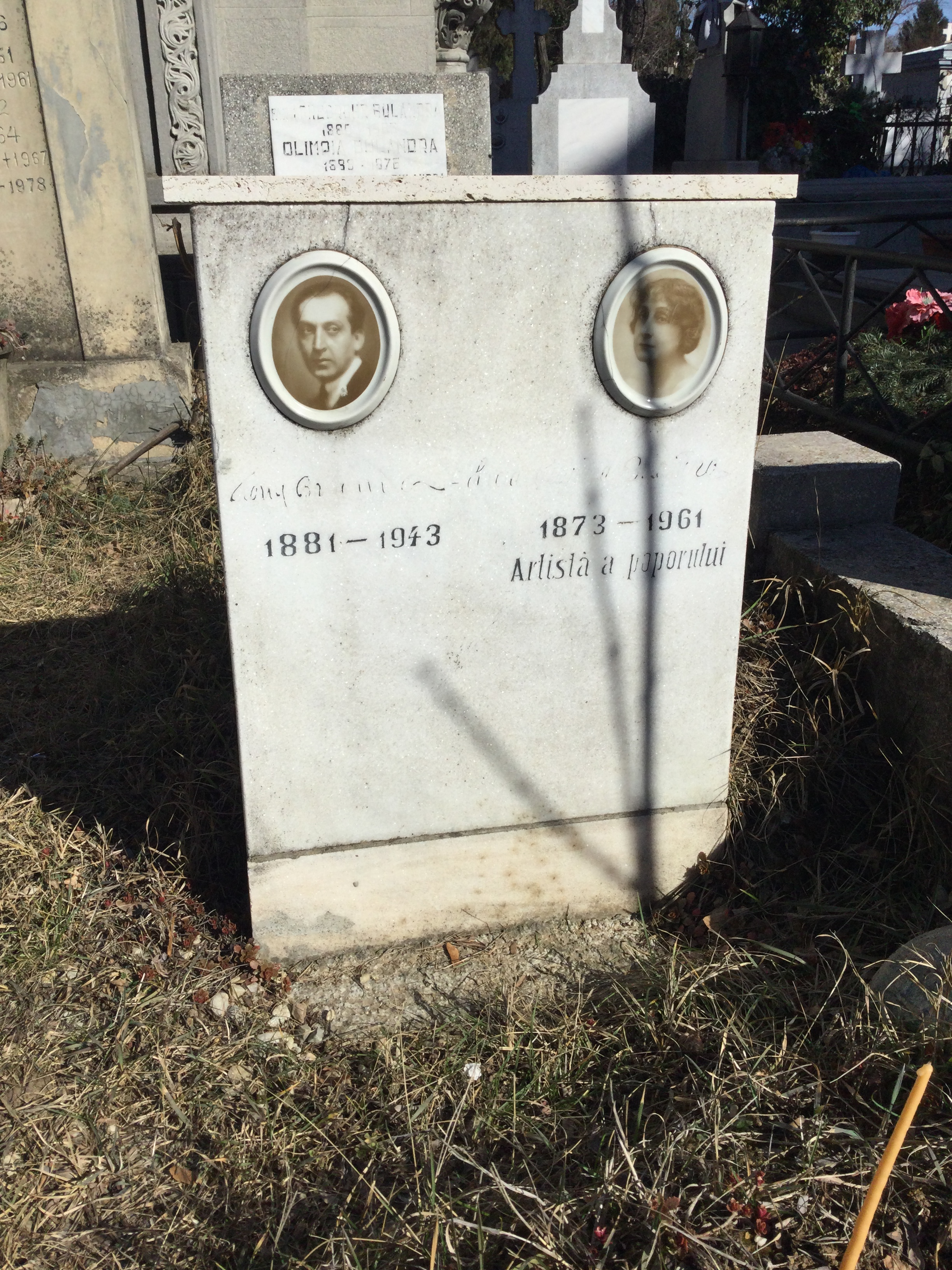
Grave at Sfânta Vineri Cemetery

She married fellow actor Tony Bulandra. She died in Bucharest în 1961, as a result of an accidental fall.

== Legacy ==
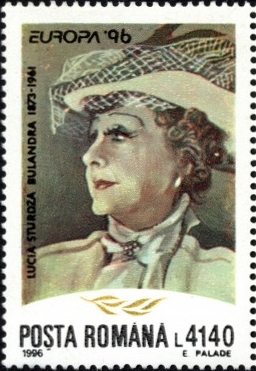
1996 Poșta Română stamp with Sturdza-Bulandra

The ”Lucia Sturdza-Bulandra Prize for Best Performance by an Actress” is named for her. In 2013, the National Bank of Romania issued a commemorative silver coin with a nominal value of 10 lei to commemorate 140 years since her birth.

Streets in Cluj-Napoca and Iași bear her name.
