= Toma Caragiu =

Romanian actor

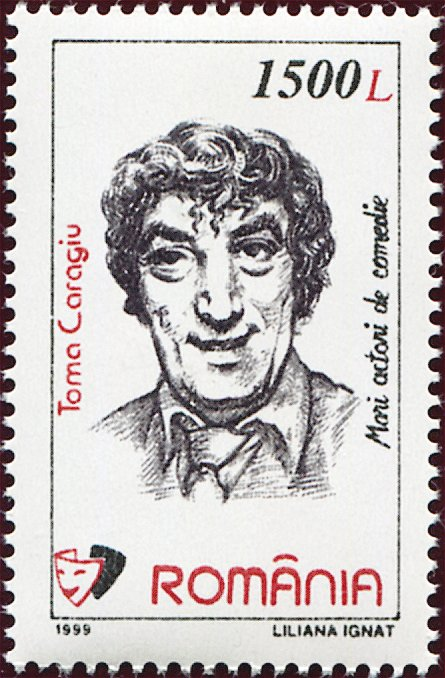
- Born: 21 August 1925; Chroupista, Kastoria Prefecture, Greece
- Died: 4 March 1977 (aged 51); Bucharest, SR Romania
- Occupation: Actor
- Relatives: Matilda Caragiu Marioțeanu (sister); Geta Caragiu (sister)

Toma Caragiu (Romanian pronunciation: [ˈtoma karaˈdʒi.u]; 21 August 1925 – 4 March 1977) was a Romanian theatre, television and film actor.

== Biography ==
He was born in an Aromanian family from the village of Chroupista (since 1926 renamed Argos Orestiko) in the region of Macedonia in Greece on 21 August 1925. Toma Caragiu was one of the best-known Romanian actors, with a rich activity in both film and theatre. He liked to play comic characters, but he excelled also in drama, one of his reference films being "Actorul și Sălbaticii". He played alongside great actors such as Ștefan Bănică, Octavian Cotescu, Anda Călugăreanu etc.

Toma Caragiu is most famous for his monologues. In these short stories, he managed to put together stories that combined sarcasm, satire and black humor. His monologues were subtle and dealt with a variety of topics, starting with politics and ending up with mythical concepts. In each and every monologue he added a personal touch to the script, thus creating a warm and humorous atmosphere.

He died in Bucharest, during the earthquake of 4 March 1977. He is buried at Bellu Cemetery. His first wife was the actress Maria Bondar and the second one was Elena Bichman.

Caragiu had two sisters, linguist Matilda Caragiu Marioțeanu and sculptor Geta Caragiu.

== Partial filmography ==
- Nufărul roșu (1956, directed by Gheorghe Tobias)
- Nu vreau să mă însor (1961)
- Vară romantică (1961, directed by Sinisa Ivetici)
- Străzile au amintiri (1962, directed by Manole Marcus) - Comiserul
- Poveste sentimentală (1962, directed by Iulian Mihu) - Ioachim
- Politică și delicatese (1963, directed by Haralambie Boroș)
- Cartierul veseliei (1965, directed by Manole Marcus) - Gheorghe Gheorghe
- Forest of the Hanged (1965) - Habsburg officer
- Procesul alb (1966, directed by Iulian Mihu)
- Haiducii (1966) - Haiducul Răspopitul
- Vremea zăpezilor (1966, directed by Gheorghe Naghi)
- Subteranul (1967, directed by Virgil Calotescu) - Florescu
- Șeful sectorului suflete (1967) - Horațiu
- Răpirea fecioarelor (1968, directed by Dinu Cocea) - haiducul Răspopitul
- Răzbunarea haiducilor (1968) - Răspopitul
- KO (1968, directed by Mircea Mureșan) - Olympian
- Brigada Diverse intră în acțiune (1970) - Căpitanul Panait
- B.D. în alertă - Profesorul de mimică (1970) - Căpitanul Panait
- Haiducii lui Șaptecai (1971) - Răspopitul
- Zestrea domniței Ralu (1971) - Răspopitul
- Brigada Diverse în alertă! (1971) - Căpitanul Panait
- B.D. la munte și la mare (1971) - Captain Panait
- Săptămîna nebunilor (1971) - Răspopitu
- Facerea lumii (1971, directed by Gheorghe Vitanidis) - afaceristul Marinescu
- B.D. în alertă - Văduve cu termen redus (1971) - Căpitanul Panait
- Bariera (1972, directed by Mircea Mureșan) - șeful de post de jandarmi Iftimie
- Ciprian Porumbescu (1973) - The Colonel
- Explozia (1973, directed by Mircea Drăgan) - Corbea
- Trei scrisori secrete (1974, directed by Virgil Calotescu)
- Dragostea începe vineri (1974)
- Tatăl risipitor (1974, directed by Adrian Petringenaru) - Oaie
- Proprietarii (1974, directed by Șerban Creangă)
- Nu filmăm să ne-amuzăm (1974)
- Un august în flăcări (1974) - Șeful Siguranței, Grigore Mizdrache
- Actorul și sălbaticii (1975) - Costica Caratase
- Mastodontul (1975, directed by Virgil Calotescu) - Gogan
- Singurătatea florilor (1976) - taximetristul Grigore Pascu
- Dincolo de pod (1976)
- Operațiunea Monstrul (1976) - directorul Dumitru
- Serenada pentru etajul XII (1976, directed by Carol Corfanta) - Retired Worker Firu
- Premiera (1976) - Titi Precup
- Gloria nu cântă (1976, directed by Alexandru Bocăneț)
- Casa de la miezul nopții (1976)
- Condiția Penelopei (1976, directed by Luminița Cazacu)
- Buzduganul cu trei peceți (1977, directed by Constantin Vaeni) - Pamfilie / Popa Traista
- Marele singuratic (1977)
- Tufă de Veneția (1977, directed by Petre Bokor) - (final film role)
