= Virgil Calotescu =

Romanian film director

- Born: 16 January 1928; Dobroteasa, Romania
- Died: 6 May 1991 (aged 63); Bucharest, Romania
- Occupation: Film director
- Years active: 1952–1987

Virgil Calotescu (16 January 1928 – 6 May 1991) was a Romanian film director. He directed nearly 50 films between 1952 and 1987. His 1967 film The Subterranean was entered into the 5th Moscow International Film Festival.

== Selected filmography ==
- The Subterranean (1967)
