= Life Triumphs (1951 film) =

1951 film

- Directed by: Dinu Negreanu
- Cinematography: Ion Cosma; Ovidiu Gologan
- Release date: 1951
- Country: Romania
- Language: Romanian

Life Triumphs (Romanian: Viața învinge) is a 1951 Romanian drama film directed by Dinu Negreanu. It was made at the Barrandov Studios in Prague, due to the shortage of facilities in Romania. A professor thwarts an attempt by foreign powers, using a member of the traditional pre-communist intelligentsia, to get hold of a new industrial process.

== Cast ==
- Jules Cazaban
- Fory Etterle
- Ion Lucian
- Grigore Vasiliu-Birlic
- George Vraca

== Bibliography ==
- Liehm, Mira; Liehm, Antonín J. (1977). The Most Important Art: Eastern European Film After 1945. University of California Press. ISBN 9780520031579 – via Internet Archive.
