= Forest of the Hanged =

1965 film

- Directed by: Liviu Ciulei
- Written by: Titus Popovici; Liviu Rebreanu
- Starring: Victor Rebengiuc; Ștefan Ciubotărașu; Liviu Ciulei; Emil Botta
- Cinematography: Ovidiu Gologan
- Edited by: Yolanda Mîntulescu
- Music by: Theodor Grigoriu
- Production company: Studioul Cinematografic București
- Release date: 16 March 1965
- Running time: 158 minutes
- Country: Romania
- Language: Romanian

Forest of the Hanged (Romanian: Pădurea Spânzuraților) is a 1965 Romanian drama film directed by Liviu Ciulei. It is based on the eponymous novel by Liviu Rebreanu. However, it deviates significantly from the original work, as it was produced under the supervision of the Romanian Workers Party. Forest of the Hanged became the first Romanian film to achieve wide international recognition. Ciulei, who also plays the role of Captain Otto Klapka, won the award for Best Director at the 1965 Cannes Film Festival.

The film tells the story of Lieutenant Apostol Bologa (Victor Rebengiuc), a Romanian serving in the Austro-Hungarian Army during World War 1. Slowly, the terror of his routine and situation forces him to choose between his military duty or greater feelings of humanity.

The film was produced by Studioul Cinematographic București and was highly praised both internationally and domestically.

== Plot ==
Lieutenant Apostol Bologa, an ethnic Romanian serving in the Austro-Hungarian Army, votes to sentence Second Lieutenant Svoboda to death. Svoboda is an ethnic Czech serving in the Austro-Hungarian Army who is found guilty of desertion and sentenced to death by hanging. While awaiting for Svodoba to arrive at his execution, Bologa meets Captain Klapka. Captain Klapka, also an ethnic Czech, is recently transferred from the Italian front to serve in the same regiment as Bologa. They, along with the majority of the regiment, witness the execution of Svoboda.

The execution of Svoboda deeply affects Bologa. Combined with the influence of Czech Captain Klapka and other minority soldiers in the Austro-Hungarian army, the seeds of doubt are planted in Bologa. He begins to question his role in the empire and the purpose of his life.

Bologa joins his fellow officers for dinner. There he faces sharp criticism, especially from Captain Cervenko, for his role in voting for the execution of Svoboda. Cervenko is a pious man who believes in Tolstoy's views. He is an adherent to non-violence and is said to carry a bat into battle. Cervenko proclaims that agony is necessary, and only in agony can true love grow. Klapka responds in a sardonic tone by saying that this love they immerse themselves in is only nourished with bullets and hangings. A Hungarian officer gets up and responds by noting that despite all their talk Cervenko still goes to battle, Bologa still fights against his fellow Romanians, and the Czech officers stood by as one of their own got hanged. That same officer talks about a "weird" Johan Müller, and his dream of an Internationale where all ethnicities unite. He sarcastically jokes that they already have this in Austria-Hungary, a place where all ethnicities fight in an International Imperial Army.

After dinner, Bologa and Klapka head to their room to sleep. Bologa sits in the quarters he now shares with Klapka. Bologa is clearly troubled and keeps repeating that Svoboda was innocent. Klapka responds by saying they are all guilty and gives Bologa a bottle to drink from. Before Bologa can fall asleep, a bright beam of light floods the room from outside. It rotates persistently, keeping both him and Klapka awake. Klapka remarks that they shouldn't curse the light, given the darkness they find themselves in. He goes on to say that any light, no matter who or where it comes from, is always welcome.

Bologa is forced to judge twelve Romanian peasants accused of espionage. Unable to bear the thought of condemning more of his fellow Romanians, he decides to desert towards the Romanian lines. Before he can reach them, he is caught and sentenced to hanging.

As he is transported to jail before his execution, he passes through the forest where the twelve Romanian peasants he was meant to judge now hang from the trees. In jail, he is visited by the people closest to him who are still alive. Captain Klapka pleads with him to let him argue that Bologa simply got lost, but Bologa refuses. Apostol Bologa can no longer live as he has.

== Cast ==
- Victor Rebengiuc as Lieutenant Apostol Bologa
- Anna Széles as Ilona
- Ștefan Ciubotărașu as Petre Petre
- György Kovács as Habsburg General Von Karg
- Gina Patrichi as Roza Jánosi
- Liviu Ciulei as Captain Otto Klapka
- Costache Antoniu as The Priest
- George Aurelian as Domșa (Marta's father)
- Emil Botta as Captain Cervenko
- Constantin Brezeanu as The Military Prosecutor
- Ion Caramitru as Petre Petre
- Toma Caragiu as Habsburg officer
- Nicolae Tomazoglu as The Army Doctor
- András Csiky as Lieutenant Sándor Varga
- Emmerich Schäffer as Johan Maria Müller
- Gheorghe Cozorici as captured Romanian officer
- Mihai Mereuță as Corporal overseeing gravediggers
- Mariana Mihuț as Marta Domșa
- Nae Roman as a Colonel
- László Kiss as Paul Vidor (Ilona's father)
- Valeriu Arnăutu as Captain Svoboda
- Ferenc Bencze as an NCO
- Alexandra Polizu as Rodovica
- Radu Dunăreanu as an NCO
- Nicolae Luchian Botez as an Officer
- Constantin Lipovan as a Soldier
- Val Lefescu as The Telegraph Operator
- Marga Barbu
- Angela Moldovan as Sofica Domșa (Marta's mother)

== Production ==
Forest of the Hanged was produced by Studioul Cinematografic București. It entered production on 29 March 1963, and was finished on 29 December 1964. The Socialist Republic of Romania recently completed the construction of the Centru de Producție Cinematografică located in Buftea. These studios functioned and still function as the largest studios in Romania. They were extensively used in the production of Forest of the Hanged. The film was extensively filmed on location in several picturesque areas throughout Romania. In Brașov County, the locations filmed in were Purcăreni, Feldioara, Hoghiz, Araci, Prejmer, and Rotbav. In Cluj County, the locations filmed in were Bonțida and Turda. The movie also had scenes filmed in the capital, Bucharest. Bonțida, a village just north of Cluj-Napoca, features the Bánffy Castle; the castle was used in the filming of Forest of the Hanged.

== Reception ==
The movie premiered on 16 March 1965 in the Great Hall at Palace Hall (Romanian: Sala Palatului). The release and reception of the movie temporarily removed Liviu Ciulei from ten years of surveillance from the Department of State Security (Securitate) and closed his case. The movie was seen by 5,448,270 in 1965 and highly praised. Internationally, Forest of the Hanged became the first Romanian film to achieve wide international recognition. For his creative and exceptional direction, Liviu Ciulei received the Best Director award at the 1965 Cannes Film Festival and was nominated for the Palme d'Or. The movie won the prize of excellence for the photographic quality of the image and the ingenuity of the camera movements in 1964 from the International Union of Technical Cinematograph Associations (UNIATEC) held in Milan, Italy.

Domestically, at the National Film Festival held in Mamaia, Romania in 1965, the movie received many awards. It received the Grand Award of the White Pelican (Marele Premiu "Pelicanul Alb"). Ovidiu Gologan, the cinematographer of the movie received the Award for Best Image (Premiul pentru imagine). Ana Széles, who played Ilona, received the Best Actress Award (Pemiul pentru interpretare feminină). Theodor Grigoriu, the film composer, received the Award for Best Music (Premiul pentru muzică). In 2008, the Romanian Film Critics Associations (Asociația Criticilor de Film) made a ranking of the 10 best Romanian films produced since 1912. Based on the responses of the forty film critics involved in this task, Forest of the Hanged was voted as the second best Romanian film ever produced.

Forest of the Hanged alongside the original novel by Liviu Rebreanu, have long been and continue to be foundational pieces for the school curricula in both Romania and Moldova. They are essential works of art that have been analyzed and referenced by countless professors, students, and individuals. The tragic experiences, spiritual elements, and emotions embodied by the characters in the Forest of the Hanged have been instrumental in developing and better understanding Romanian culture and identity. Additionally, they offer a deeper insight into the human experience as a whole.

== Historical background ==
Forest of the Hanged takes place during the First World War. The Kingdom of Romania joined the war on the side of the Allied Powers on 27 August 1916 with the primary goal of reuniting Romanians located in the regions of Transylvania, Banat, and Bukovina, which were at that time part of Austria-Hungary.

Forest of the Hanged, like many other Eastern European films of that time, was made under an oppressive communist system. All film activities were under the strict surveillance of the Party and the secret police. Most writers and filmmakers refrained from outright contesting the systems of power as there was heavy pre and post-production censorship.

By the late 1960s, two dominant themes had emerged in Romanian films. Historical and Contemporary films. Grand narratives and striking visuals were used in historical films to reimagine the past and captivate audiences. Contemporary films centered on the present while focusing on the patriotism and morality of the average working-class citizen.

Forest of the Hanged alongside other historical films helped bridge the gap between the two tendencies while reinforcing that communism was the long-awaited force that would ensure personal and national advancement. Even though the films were based on history, the films of that time were not meant to reflect on it, but rather to make it.
