= The Sun Rises (1954 film) =

- Directed by: Dinu Negreanu
- Written by: Mihai Novicov; Cezar Petrescu
- Cinematography: Wilfried Ott
- Music by: Ion Dumitrescu
- Release date: 1954
- Country: Romania
- Language: Romanian

The Sun Rises (Romanian: Răsare soarele) is a 1954 Romanian drama film directed by Dinu Negreanu. It was made at the recently opened Buftea Studios in Bucharest. The film is a sequel to Negreanu's 1953 film The Bugler's Grandsons, and covers the Second World War and post-war years.

== Plot ==
The film depicts the life of Cristea Dorobanțu during World War II. Dorobanțu is an underground communist fighter who organizes the sabotage of the weapons production at the Racoviceanu factory and of a laboratory for the manufacture of explosives.

== Cast ==
- Marga Barbu
- Constantin Codrescu
- Iurie Darie
- Fory Etterle
- Constantin Ramadan
- Marieta Sadova
- Ion Talianu
- George Vraca as Dobre Racoviceanu

== Reception ==
The film was seen by 1,224,413 viewers in cinemas in Romania, as attested by a situation of the number of viewers recorded by Romanian films from the date of premiere until December 31, 2014 compiled by the National Center of Cinematography.

== Bibliography ==
- Liehm, Mira; Liehm, Antonín J. (1977). The Most Important Art: Eastern European Film After 1945. University of California Press – via Internet Archive.
