= 1965 Cannes Film Festival =

- Official poster of the 18th Cannes Film Festival
- Opening film: The Collector
- Closing film: Tokyo Olympiad
- Location: Cannes, France
- Founded: 1946
- Awards: Grand Prix du Festival: The Knack ...and How to Get It
- No. of films: 26 (In Competition)
- Festival date: 3 May 1965 – 16 May 1965
- Website: festival-cannes.com/en

Cannes Film Festival
- 1966 1964

The 18th Cannes Film Festival took place from 3 to 16 May 1965. Olivia de Havilland served as jury president for the main competition, becoming the first woman to ever do so.

The Grand Prix du Festival International du Film, then the festival's main prize, was awarded to The Knack ...and How to Get It by Richard Lester.

The festival opened with The Collector by William Wyler, and closed with Tokyo Olympiad by Kon Ichikawa.

== Juries ==
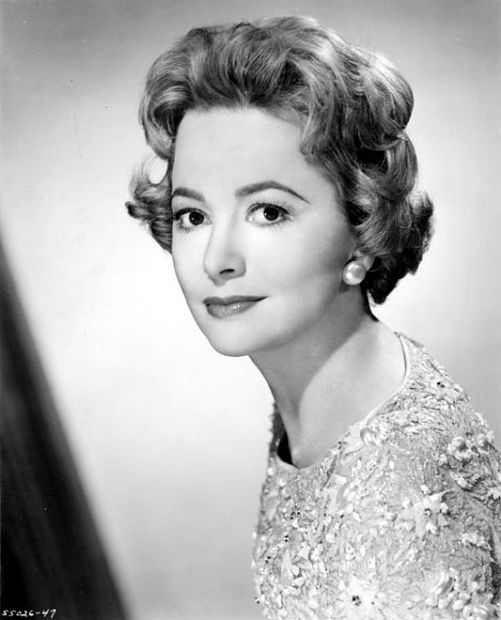
Olivia de Havilland, Jury President

=== Main Competition ===
- Olivia de Havilland, British-American actress - Jury President
- Goffredo Lombardo, Italian producer - Jury Vice-President
- André Maurois, French writer - Honorary Jury President
- Max Aub, Mexican writer
- Michel Aubriant, French journalist
- Rex Harrison, British actor
- François Reichenbach, French filmmaker
- Alain Robbe-Grillet, French filmmaker
- Konstantin Simonov, Soviet writer
- Edmond Ténoudji, French-Algerian producer
- Jerzy Toeplitz, Polish film educator

=== Short Films Competition ===
- Gérardot, French - Jury President
- Istvan Dosai, Hungarian cinematographer
- Jacques Ledoux, Belgian cinema specialist
- Herman van der Horst, Dutch
- Carlos Vilardebó, French

== Official selection ==
=== In Competition ===
The following feature films competed for the Grand Prix du Festival International du Film:

English title	Original title	Director(s)	Production country
The 317th Platoon	La 317ème section	Pierre Schoendoerffer	France
Always Further On	Tarahumara (Cada vez más lejos)	Luis Alcoriza	Mexico
The Amphitheatre	El Reñidero	René Mugica	Argentina
Circus Angel	Fifi la plume	Albert Lamorisse	France
Clay		Giorgio Mangiamele	Australia
The Collector (opening film)		William Wyler	United Kingdom, United States
The First Day of Freedom	Pierwszy dzien wolnosci	Aleksander Ford	Poland
Forest of the Hanged	Padurea spânzuratilor	Liviu Ciulei	Romania
The Hill		Sidney Lumet	United Kingdom
A Girl Danced Into His Life	Az Életbe táncoltatott leány	Tamás Banovich	Hungary
The Ipcress File		Sidney J. Furie	United Kingdom
The Knack ...and How to Get It		Richard Lester	United Kingdom
Kwaidan	怪談	Masaki Kobayashi	Japan
The Lark	Жаворонок	Nikita Kurikhin and Leonid Menaker	Soviet Union
Loving Couples	Älskande par	Mai Zetterling	Sweden
Men and Women	Noite Vazia	Walter Hugo Khouri	Brazil
The Moment of Truth	Il momento della verità	Francesco Rosi	Italy
My Home Is Copacabana	Mitt hem är Copacabana	Arne Sucksdorff	Sweden
The Shop on Main Street	Obchod na korze	Ján Kadár and Elmar Klos	Czechoslovakia
The Sin	الحرام	Henry Barakat	Egypt
Snakes and Ladders	El juego de la oca	Manuel Summers	Spain
There Was an Old Couple	Жили-были старик со старухой	Grigory Chukhray	Soviet Union
Torrid Noon	Горещо пладне	Zako Heskiya	Bulgaria
Treason	Προδοσία	Kostas Manoussakis	Greece
The Uninhibited	Los pianos mecánicos	Juan Antonio Bardem	Spain, France, Italy
Yo Yo		Pierre Étaix	France

=== Out of Competition ===
The following films were selected to be screened out of competition:

English title	Original title	Director(s)	Production country
Amsterdam (short)		Herman Van Der Horst	Netherlands
Le Cinquième Soleil		Jacqueline Grigaut-Lefevre	France
In Harm's Way		Otto Preminger	United States
John F. Kennedy: Years of Lightning, Day of Drums		Bruce Herschensohn	United States
Mary Poppins		Robert Stevenson	United States
Tokyo Olympiad (closing film)	東京オリンピック	Kon Ichikawa	Japan

=== Short Films Competition ===
The following short films competed for the Short Film Palme d'Or:

- Aah... Tamara by Pim de la Parra
- Anamniseis apo tin Ellada by Francis Carabott
- Asinus by Vasil Mirchev
- Au bord de la route by Chou-Tchen Wang
- Ban ye ji jiao by Yeou Lei
- Le Crocodile majuscule by Eddy Ryssack
- Évariste Galois by Alexandre Astruc
- Féerie du cuivre by Herbert E. Meyer
- I videl sam daljine meglene i kalne by Zlatko Bourek
- Johann Sebastian Bach: Fantasy in G minor by Jan Švankmajer
- Los Junqueros by Oscar Kantor
- The Legend of Jimmy Blue Eyes by Robert Clouse
- Monsieur Plateau by Jean Brismée
- Noworoczna noc by Jerzy Zitzman
- Ohrid Express by Jean Dasque and Robert Legrand
- Overture by János Vadász
- Petrol-Carburant-Kraftstoff by Hugo Niebeling
- Poprannii obet by Guénrikh Markarian
- Processioni in Sicilia by Michele Gandin
- Sanawat el magd by Atef Salem

== Parallel section ==
=== International Critics' Week ===
The following feature films were screened for the 4th International Critics' Week (4e Semaine de la Critique):

- Amador by Francisco Regueiro (Spain)
- Andy by Richard C. Sarafian (United States)
- The Cat in the Bag (Le chat dans le sac) by Gilles Groulx (Canada)
- The Glass Cage (La cage de verre) by Philippe Arthuys, Jean-Louis Levi-Avarès (France, Israel)
- Hole in the Moon (Hor B'Levana) by Uri Zohar (Israel)
- It Happened Here by Kevin Brownlow, Andrew Mollo (United Kingdom)
- Walkover by Jerzy Skolimowski (Poland)
- Diamonds of the Night (Démanty noci) by Jan Nemec (Czechoslovakia)
- Passages from James Joyce's Finnegans Wake by Mary Ellen Bute (United States)

== Official Awards ==
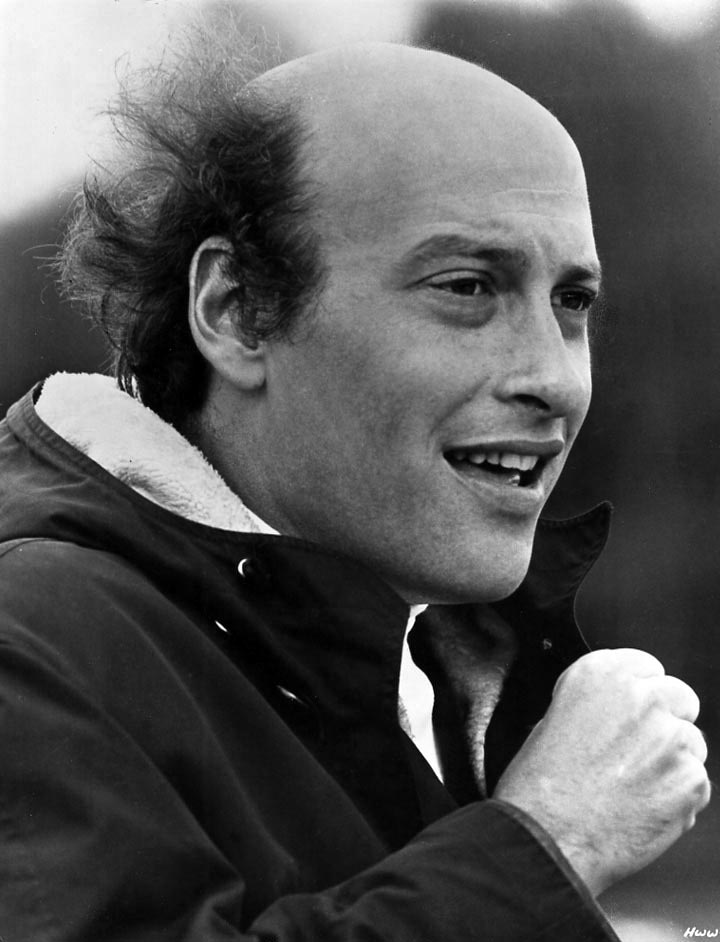
Richard Lester, Grand Prix winner

=== Main Competition ===
- Grand Prix du Festival International du film: The Knack ...and How to Get It by Richard Lester
- Prix spécial du Jury: Kwaidan by Masaki Kobayashi
- Best Director: Liviu Ciulei for Forest of the Hanged
- Best Screenplay:
  - Pierre Schoendoerffer for The 317th Platoon
  - Ray Rigby for The Hill
- Best Actress: Samantha Eggar for The Collector
- Best Actor: Terence Stamp for The Collector
- Special Mention:
  - Jozef Kroner and Ida Kamińska for The Shop on Main Street
  - Vera Kuznetsova for There Was an Old Couple

=== Short Films Competition ===
- Short Film Palme d'Or: Overture by János Vadász
- Prix du Jury: Johann Sebastian Bach: Fantasy in G minor by Jan Švankmajer
- Prix spécial du Jury: Monsieur Plateau by Jean Brismée
- Short film Technical Prize:
  - Ban ye ji jiao by Yeou Lei
  - Overture by János Vadász

== Independent Awards ==
=== FIPRESCI Prize ===
- Always Further On by Luis Alcoriza

=== Commission Supérieure Technique ===
- Technical Grand Prize:
  - Circus Angel by Albert Lamorisse
  - A Girl Danced Into His Life by Tamás Banovich
- Special Mention: The Knack ...and How to Get It by Richard Lester

=== OCIC Award ===
- OCIC Award: Yo Yo by Pierre Étaix

=== Best Film for the Youth ===
- Los Junqueros by Oscar Kantor
- Yo Yo by Pierre Étaix

== Media ==
- British Pathé: Cannes Film Festival 1965 footage
- British Pathé: Improvements in Cannes as 1965 Festival starts
- INA: The films of the 1965 Festival (commentary in French)
- INA: 1965: 18th anniversary of the Cannes festival (commentary in French)
- INA: List of winners of the 1965 Cannes Festival (commentary in French)
