= Miruna Runcan =

Romanian writer, semiotician, and theater critic

- Born: October 29, 1954 (age 71); Bucharest, Romania
- Occupations: theater critic, essayist, writer, professor
- Writing career
- Pen name: Miruna Runcan

Miruna Runcan (born October 29, 1954) is a Romanian-born writer, semiotician and theater critic. She received a PhD in Theater's Aesthetics from the Bucharest University of Theater and Film in 1999 for complex historical and aesthetic research on Romanian modern stage-directing and theater theories from 1920 to 1960.

== Career ==
After 1989, she was involved in several activist and theatrical projects, both in media ethics and theater criticism. She published the first Romanian book on media law and ethics for young journalists (1997, Bucharest, All Publishing House), followed by The Fourth Power: Ethics and Law for Journalists (Cluj, 2002, Dacia Publishing House). After 2001, she has been a professor at Babeş-Bolyai University of Cluj, Romania. Still, theater criticism and interdisciplinary studies on media, film and theatre constitute the principle field of her activities in research, writing and teaching.

She edited (with Alina Nelega as editor-in-chief and C.C. Buricea-Mlinarcic and Anca Rotescu), the first Romanian interdisciplinary magazine dedicated to the alternative theatrical movement, ultimaT (Targu Mures, from 1999 to 2000). Then, as a part of an independent theatrical group in Cluj, Teatrul Imposibil, she became the editor-in-chief of Man.In.Fest: Performing Culture Magazine, who became an independent publication in 2006.

In 2004, she starts – together with Romanian playwright and theatre theoretician C.C. Buricea-Mlinarcic – a complex group project, reuniting field research, anthropological analysis and theatre and film creation: the Everyday Life Drama Program. From 2009, the program became the Everyday Drama Laboratory of the Theatre Research and Creation Center "Vlad Mugur", awarded with a three-year substantial research grant from the Ministry of Education and Research.

== Work ==
=== Books ===
- Cinci divane ad-hoc, with C.C.Buricea Mlinarcic, Bucharest: Cartea Românească, 1996
- Introduction to Media Law and Ethics, Bucharest: All Publishing House, 1998
- The Romanian Theater Model, Bucharest: Unitext Publishing House, 2001
- The Fourth Power. Ethics and Law for Journalists, Cluj: Dacia Publishing House, 2002
- The “Theatricalisation” of Romanian Theatre.1920–1960, Cluj: Eikon Publishing House, 2003
- For a Semiotics of the Theatrical Performance, Cluj: Dacia Publishing House, 2005
- The Sceptical Spectator’s Armchair, Bucharest: Unitext Publishing House, 2007
- Habarnam in orasul teatrului/The Univers of Alexandru Dabija's Performances. Bucharest: Limes Publishing House, 2010
- Actori care ard fara rest"/Actors can Burn, Bucharest: Camil Petrescu Foundation, 2011
- Signore Misterioso. O anatomie a spectatorului/Signore Misterioso _An Anatomy of the Spectator, Bucharest: UNITEXT, 2011
- Critica de teatru. Încotro?/ Theatre Criticism. Whereto? Cluj-Napoca: Presa Universitară Clujeană, 2015
- ODEON 70. O aventură istoric-omagială/ODEON 70. A Historical Adventure, Bucharest: Oscar Print, 2016
- Teatru în diorame. Discursul criticii de teatru în comunism Vol I, Fluctuantul dezgheț /Theatre in Diorama. The Discourse of Theatre Criticism in Communism. Vol I: The Fluctuant Thaw, Bucharest, Tracus Arte, 2019.
- Teatru în diorame. Discursul criticii teatrale în comunism. Amăgitoarea primăvară 1965–1977, Vol II, Tracus Arte, 2020.
- Teatru în diorame. Discursul criticii de teatru în comunism. Viscolul 1978-1989, Vol III, Tracus Arte, 2021.

=== Plays ===
- Odaia de asediu (The Siege Room), directed by Mircea Marin, Braşov Dramatic Theater, 1983
- Atolul. Muzical după Împăratul Muştelor de William Golding(The Atoll. Musical after The Lord of the Flies by William Golding, in collaboration with C.C. Buricea-Mlinarcic, directed by Alexandru Berceanu, Zeppelin National Festival, Bucharest 2003
- Mănăştur Express, published in Man.In.Fest, nr. 16-18/2004
- Ombilicul domnului Artaud (Mr. Artaud's Bellybutton, 2009

=== Fiction ===
- Miruna Runcan, Bungee Jumping (short stories), Cluj: Limes Publishing House, 2010
- Miruna Runcan, Club 20. Retro (novel), Bucharest: Cartea romaneasca, 2017

=== Translations ===
==== Books ====
- René Girard, Despre cele ascunse de la întemeierea lumii, București: Nemira, 1998
- Michel de Ghelderode, Soarele apune, București: Alfa, 1998

==== Performed Plays ====
- Edward Albee, The Lady from Dubuque, Braşov Dramatic Theater, 1983
- Per Olof Ekström, The Lynx Hour, Bucharest, Odeon Theater, 1993
