= If I Were Harap Alb =

1965 film

- Directed by: Ion Popescu-Gopo
- Written by: Ion Creangă; Ion Popescu-Gopo
- Starring: Florin Piersic
- Cinematography: Grigore Ionescu
- Release date: July 1965
- Running time: 91 minutes
- Country: Romania
- Language: Romanian

If I Were Harap Alb (Romanian: De-aș fi... Harap Alb) is a 1965 Romanian fantasy film directed by Ion Popescu-Gopo. It was entered into the 4th Moscow International Film Festival where Popescu-Gopo won the award for Best Director. The film is based on the fairy tale The Story of Harap Alb by Romanian writer Ion Creangă.

== Plot ==
The plot is taken from an old fairy tale. White Moor is the prince who is second in line to the throne. After the king sends him to visit his uncle, the prince meets various memorable people and is captured by a bad guy who assumes his identity and forces him to become a slave.

== Cast ==
- Florin Piersic as Harap-Alb
- Emil Botta as Roșu Împarat
- Fory Etterle as Verde Împarat
- George Demetru as Alb Împarat
- Chris Avram as Spânul
- Liliana Tomescu as Ochilă
- Florin Vasiliu as Setilă
- Puiu Călinescu as Gerilă
- Mircea Bogdan as Flămânzilă
- Viorel Manta as Păsărilă
