= Alexandru Darie =

Romanian theater director (1959–2019)

- Born: Alexandru Darie-Maximciuc; 14 June 1959; Bucharest, Socialist Republic of Romania
- Died: 18 September 2019 (aged 60); Bucharest, Romania
- Resting place: Bellu Cemetery, Bucharest
- Other names: Ducu
- Occupation: Director
- Children: Serghei Darie
- Parents: Iurie Darie; Consuela Roșu
- Awards: Ordre des Arts et des Lettres; Order of the Star of Italian Solidarity; National Order of Faithful Service

Alexandru Darie (14 June 1959 – 18 September 2019) was a Romanian theater director. Born into an acting family, the son of Iurie Darie and Consuela Roșu, he graduated from the Caragiale Academy of Theatrical Arts and Cinematography in Bucharest in 1983. He directed dozens of plays and was the director of the Bulandra Theater in Bucharest from 2002 until his death in 2019. From 2006 to 2011 he was the president of the Union of European Theatres (UTE). He was nominated for and won a number of awards, both at the national level and the international level; his plays were performed in both Romania and abroad.

Darie married and later divorced scenographer Maria Miu; they had a son, Serghei. He died after battling cirrhosis at the Fundeni Hospital in Bucharest. He was buried in the city's Bellu Cemetery.

During his career he directed many plays including The Sexton by Marin Sorescu, The Good Person of Szechwan by Bertold Brecht, 1794, adapted by Oana Turbatu and Alexandru Darie after Danton by Camil Petrescu, Danton's Death by Georg Büchner, and Marat/Sade by Peter Weiss. In 1995, he directed Three Sisters" by Anton Chekhov, for which he won the UNITER Prize for the best director. He also directed works by William Shakespeare, including A Midsummer Night's Dream, The Winter's Tale, Macbeth, and Coriolanus.

Darie was awarded both the Ordre des Arts et des Lettres and the Order of the Star of Italian Solidarity for his work. He also received the National Order of Faithful Service, Officer rank in 2000.
