= Bulandra Theatre =

Coordinates: 44.43383°N 26.08946°E

The building containing Sala Liviu Ciulei (Izvor)

Another view of the Izvor building

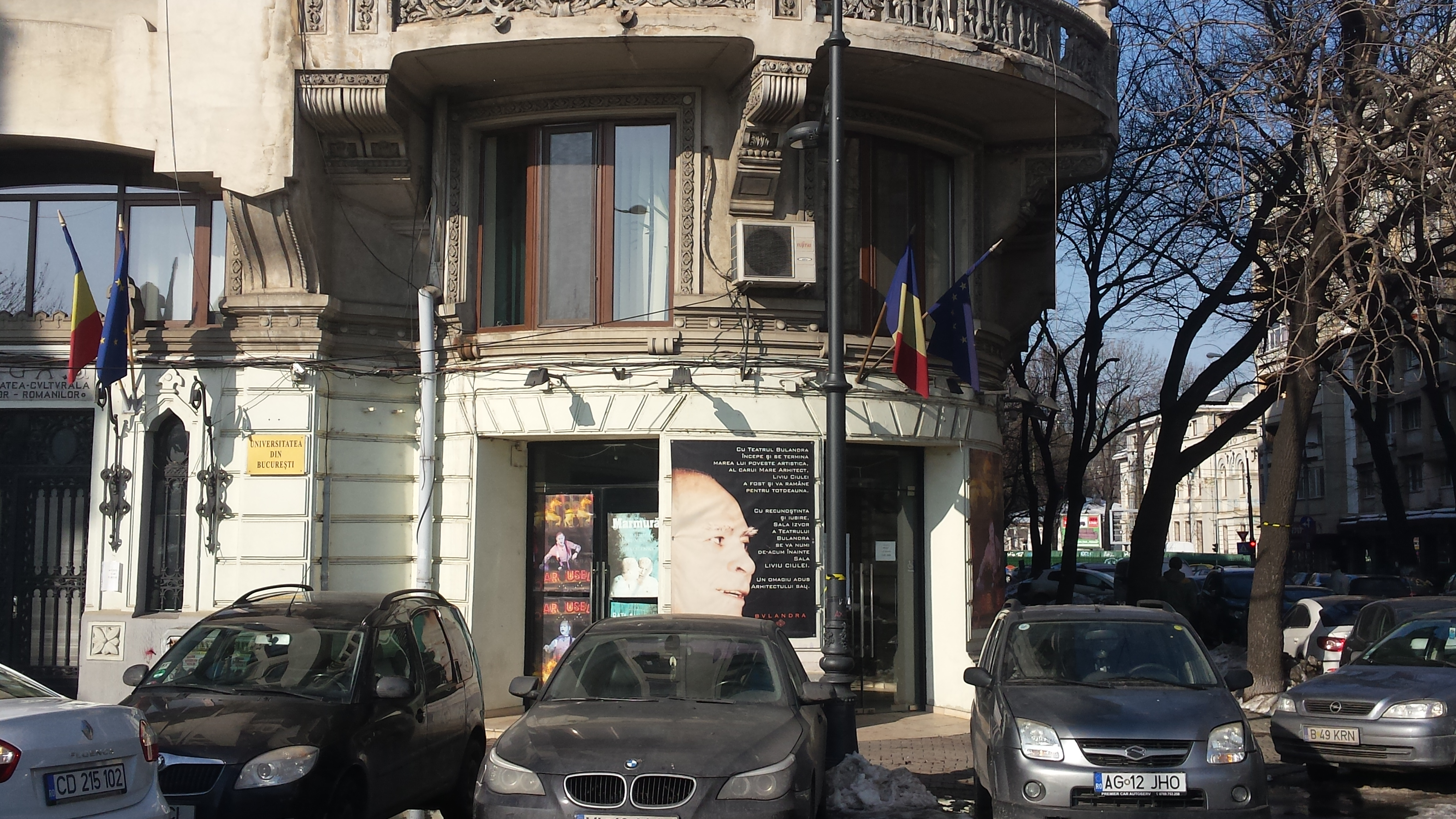
Sala Toma Caragiu

The Bulandra Theatre (Romanian: Teatrul Bulandra) in Bucharest, Romania was founded in 1947 as Teatrul Municipal; its first director was Lucia Sturdza-Bulandra, one of the leading Romanian stage actresses of her generation. Liviu Ciulei was director between 1963 and 1972; one of the most important directors since then was Ștefan Iordănescu (1999–2002), who restructured the theatre management. From 2002 until his death in 2019, the theatre was directed by Alexandru Darie; as of 2020, the director is Vlad Zamfirescu.

Since 1991, the Bulandra Theatre has been a member of the Union of European Theatres, which was founded in March 1990. The theatre currently has two stages, located about 1.5 km (0.93 mi) apart from one another: Sala Liviu Ciulei, the former Sala Izvor (renovated 2002) near the Dâmbovița River, not far from the southwest corner of Cișmigiu Gardens; and Sala Toma Caragiu (renovated 2003), about half a kilometer southeast of Piața Romană, just east of the Grădina Icoanei park.

Originally Teatrul Municipal, the theatre later acquired the name Teatrul Lucia Sturdza Bulandra, now shortened to Teatrul Bulandra. The present Sala Liviu Ciulei (Izvor) was and remains the headquarters, housing offices as well as the actual theatre space. The main teatre building has been renamed in 2011 after the previous head of Bulandra Theatre, film and theatre director and actor Liviu Ciulei. Before Communist times, the second hall, located by Grădina Icoanei and designed by architect Ion Mincu, was the auditorium of a private school, Școala Centrală de Fete (Central Girls' School), located on Icoanei Street. After nationalization, the hall was first renamed after Filimon Sârbu, then later took its present name, in memory of actor Toma Caragiu.
