= Fănuș Neagu =

Romanian novelist, playwright and screenwriter (1932–2011)

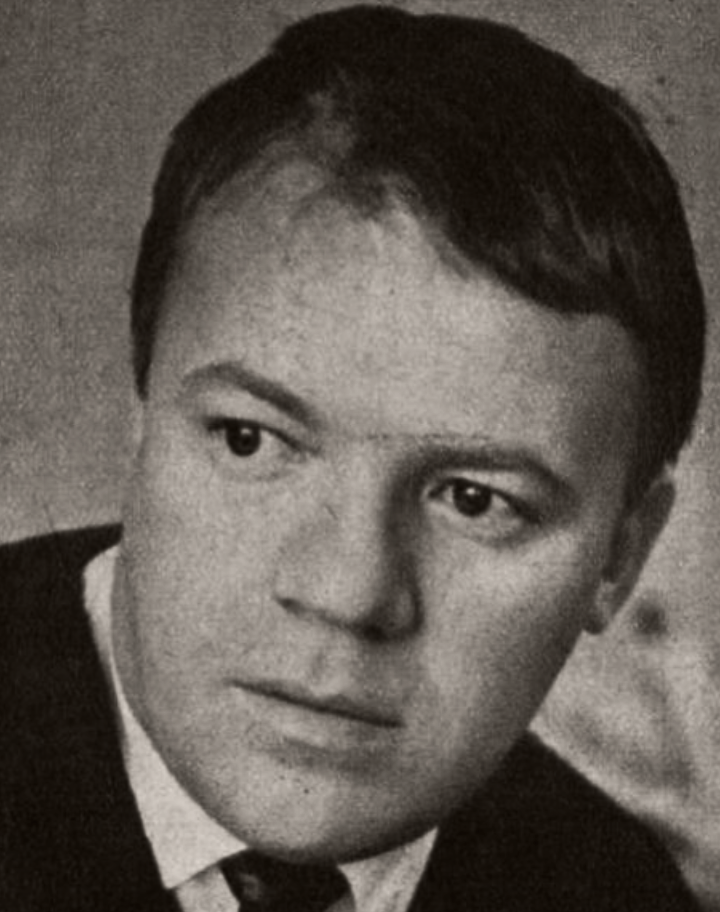
- Neagu in 1964
- Born: Ștefan Vasile Neagu; 5 April 1932; Grădiștea, Brăila County, Kingdom of Romania
- Died: 24 May 2011 (aged 79); Bucharest, Romania
- Occupations: Journalist; translator; politician; cultural manager; schoolteacher; athlete; actor
- Writing career
- Period: 1944–2011
- Genres: Short story; novella; Bildungsroman; psychological novel; prose poem; fantasy literature; absurdist fiction; dystopian fiction; comedy; satire; parody; dramatic poem; screenplay; children's literature; biography; gonzo journalism; sports journalism; political journalism; reportage; travel writing; memoir; diary; parable; aphorism; lyric poetry
- Literary movement: Modernism; Neo-romanticism; Magic realism

Ștefan Vasile "Fănuș" Neagu (5 April 1932 – 24 May 2011) was a Romanian novelist, playwright, journalist, and occasional film actor. Born to a peasant family in the Bărăgan Plain, he drew inspiration from that environment throughout his literary career. He undertook his training during the early stages of the communist regime, when he was still a teenager; in his early twenties, he was already pushing the limits of literary discourse, and the patience of ideological censors, acquiring his fame as an uncontainable rebel. Neagu's published debut came in 1959, and coincided with the onset of de-Stalinization. His short stories of the period pushed back against the influence of socialist realism, relying instead on neo-romantic and modernist models, as well as on Neagu's own resources as a raconteur. He became known, and received accolades, for a richly metaphorical and oftentimes absurdist prose, which integrated him into the tradition of magic realism; various critics remarked on his breaking the patterns of Romanian prose and his creation of a modern standard for the peasant-themed novella (announcing later works by Marin Preda), as well as on his contributing new means of expression in the Romanian language. The subtleties of this style also allowed Neagu to drop hints about communist crimes against the peasants in his debut novel, Îngerul a strigat, which appeared, to critical acclaim, in 1968.

A lifelong bohemian and habitual drinker, Neagu had an on-and-off career in the press—in the 1960s, he was mainly an editor at Luceafărul, whereby he encouraged younger authors; with time, he specialized in covering Romanian football, with columns that were admired for their skill and greatly loved by the reading public. He used these experiences in the 1976 Frumoșii nebuni ai marilor orașe, which condensed various narrative levels and became a best-seller of its day. By the late 1970s, Neagu had also involved himself with Romanian cinema—as a screenwriter, he went from being derided for his superficial comedies to being praised for dramas based on his own novellas and novels. As a literary celebrity, he had a complex relationship with Nicolae Ceaușescu, who had emerged as communist leader in 1965: though welcoming Ceaușescu's national-communist ideology (both in replicating some of its assumptions, including the revival of nationalism, and in not resisting its July Theses), he was resentful of the entire Ceaușescu family, and continued to speak his mind about some of the regime's excesses. He was kept under watch by the Securitate secret police, but also enjoyed protection—as a Dinamo-supporting journalist, he endeared himself to the overarching Ministry of Internal Affairs.

The revolution of December 1989 witnessed a critical reevaluation of Neagu's contribution, raising issues about the diminishing quality of his prose, now perceived as incoherent, repetitive, or "kitsch". He was additionally targeted for his politics, in particular after joining a left-wing nationalist and anti-capitalist caucus that supported Ion Iliescu's post-revolutionary administration. After being active within the Democratic Agrarian Party, Neagu became a committed supporter (and alleged client) of Iliescu's Social Democrats. In the 1990s and early 2000s, he generated controversy as manager of the National Theater Bucharest, as well as editor in chief of several publications, including Cronica Română and Literatorul. His answers to criticism became increasingly violent; though made a full member of the Romanian Academy in 2001, he was further isolated when he also came to reject Iliescu's policies. Incapacitated and hospitalized during the final years of his life, Neagu chronicled his declining health, and his indifference to dying, in a set of diaries, the final one of which was published posthumously.

== Biography ==
=== Early life ===
Ștefan Neagu was born on 5 April 1932 at Grădiștea, Brăila County, in what was then the Kingdom of Romania. His was a peasant family, and he remained attached spiritually to both that social class and the geographical contours of the Bărăgan. As he himself put it in a 1987 interview: "The people, the water, the grassland of that spot are what's dearest to me in the world." His parents Vasile and Paraschiva (née Miroslav) knew him under the pet name "Fănuș", which became his favorite signature, as well as a mononym in the literary community: "few people know that his other name was Neagu." The future writer had a brother and a sister; only the latter was still alive at Fănuș's death in 2011. In old age, Neagu liked to tell highly exaggerated stories of his childhood poverty, to see if those present would believe them—for instance, he circulated the claim that his feet had been bound, so that his parents would not have to spend money on shoes. In other contexts, he described his childhood as "fabulous" and rich in life lessons. His childhood friends, many of whom appear in his work under their nicknames, included both Romanians and Romanies, as he reportedly "made no difference". Aged eleven, he traveled to the local port city, Brăila, for which he preserved an "all-consuming love" throughout his life. As a "country lad", he was especially fascinated with its cosmopolitanism, discovering its community of seafaring Greeks as an introduction to the "great adventure".

The boy completed primary school in his village at the height of World War II. His father had been mobilized in the Romanian Land Forces, and Paraschiva had to provide for her children. In 1944, she obtained Fănuș a scholarship for the Military High School, which had been moved from Iași to Câmpulung. He arrived there by train, alongside Wehrmacht soldiers who "fed me all the way there". Shortly after, a palace coup chased out the Wehrmacht, and opened the country up for Soviet occupation. Neagu had positive memories of his personal encounter with the Red Army, who also provided him with food. He and his school resettled in Iași after this military realignment, and it was during his time there that he penned his first stories. He graduated in 1948, just as Romania was coming under a communist regime and a socialist army was being formed. Called up to Bucharest, he reportedly arrived there carrying his belongings in wooden suitcases, and for a while lived in townhouse basements.

By his own account, Neagu was for a while a semi-professional player of table tennis, whose greatest ranking was inclusion on Romania's national youth team. Now pursuing a career in teaching, he was trained at normal schools, first in Bucharest (where his teachers included a published poet, Emil Giurgiuca) and then in Galați. His education was supposed to be fulfilled at the Eminescu School of Literature, which he attended in 1951–1952; he also joined its volleyball team. During this time, he lived "more clandestinely than not", with Nicolae Velea and other young authors, in a small apartment at 13 Roma Street. He was also colleagues with three other authors noted for their talent: Radu Cosașu, Nicolae Labiș, and Ion Băieșu, the latter of whom became his good friend. In old age, he recalled that his literary style was shaped by foreign sources, primarily the major figures of Russian literature, and in part by the local tradition—specifically, through his readings from Mihail Sadoveanu, George Mihail Zamfirescu, Vasile Voiculescu, and Panait Istrati. He also defended the School of Literature, which had come to be derided as a communist institution: "I would not be the present-day Fănuș Neagu without [its influence]."

=== 1950s nonconformist ===
According to a biographical note penned in 2021 by Răzvan Voncu, Neagu was in fact expelled from the School of Literature, though he continued to enjoy protection from Sadoveanu and Zaharia Stancu (who were two of the regime's trusted writers). In 1953, he worked for a few months as a substitute teacher of Romanian in Largu, outside Făurei. He had enlisted at the University of Bucharest Faculty of Philology in September of that same year. He had also begun resenting the regime, and was especially interested in subverting its censorship apparatus. At least in part, he modeled his life on that of Istrati, a vagabond-writer hailing from the same geographical area as he. Fellow cultural journalist Gabriel Dimisianu, who met and befriended Neagu in 1953, recalls that he "seemed to not fear anything at all", speaking his mind even as the communists had started imprisoning or deporting men for expressing similar opinions. The two of them were joined by a communist writer, Vintilă Lamotescu-Ornaru, who was hiding his past as a landowner (as Dimisianu recounts, he would have been deemed a man of "unhealthy social origins" in the communist vocabulary). Under Lamotescu-Ornaru's influence, Neagu started placing bets at Băneasa Hippodrome. He himself never engaged in open resistance, but, as noted by literary critic Alex Ștefănescu, managed to "defeat censorship on several occasions, by winning over, intimidating or dazzling the regime's representatives." As the same author argues, Neagu was convinced that a true writer should "view himself as a treasured guest to any stranger", and that "scandalous gestures" were tolerable in people of talent.

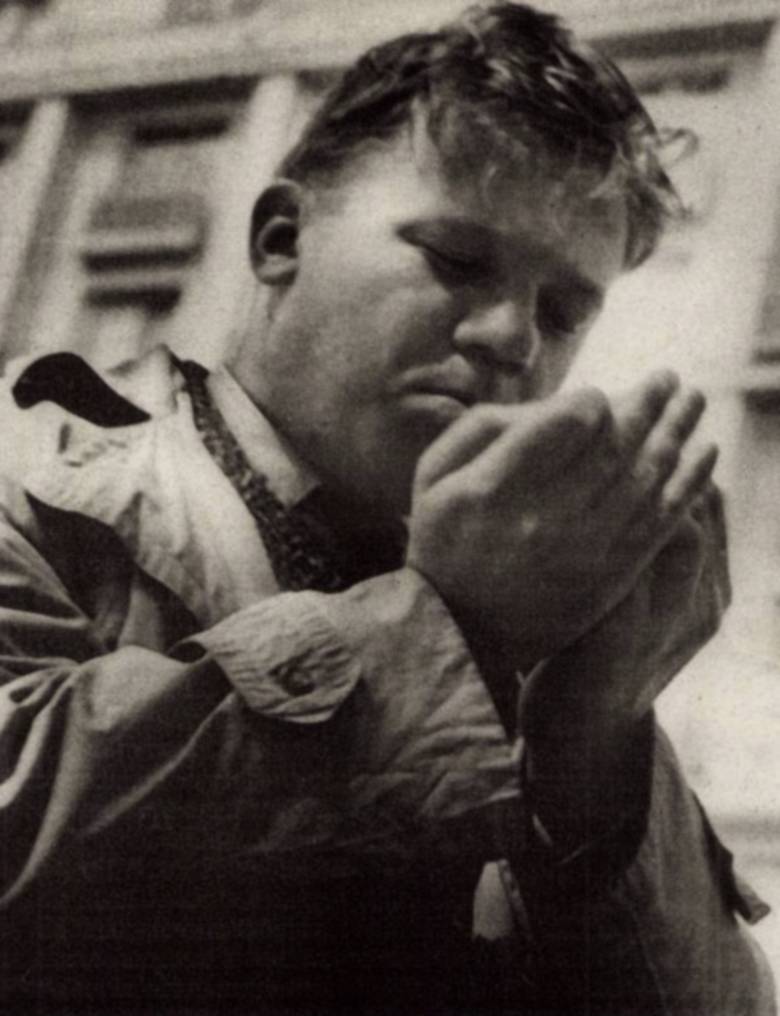
1959 photograph of Neagu smoking

Neagu rarely attended courses (with the exception of a lecture in aesthetics, provided by Tudor Vianu), and was ultimately enlisted in the distance-learning section; still, he "did not have the patience to graduate." He had befriended poet Nichita Stănescu. The two of them still paid lip service cu Marxism-Leninism, which they had to learn for their exams, but secretly trafficked in banned literature, including books by Tudor Arghezi and Ion Barbu. After a disciplinary meeting with rector Ion Cotranu, who asked him to refrain from corrupting his fellow students, Neagu realized that he could find more gainful employment, joining the staff of Scînteia Tineretului. This daily, put out by the Union of Communist Youth, had him and Băieșu as special countryside reporters. His colleagues included Nicolae Țic, who remembered him as "loud", but also "bursting with talent, in a Romanian language adhering to rules that I myself could not comprehend." Neagu was also one of the newspaper's editors, between 1954 and 1956, and remained involved with its school of reporters. Visiting the offices "some two years after" his formal departure, he happened to assist his friend C. Vasile with writing a football chronicle. The co-signed piece was also his first contribution in that genre.

Also in 1954, Neagu published his debut novella, Dușman cu lumea ("An Enemy to the World"), in Tînărul Scriitor magazine. He had already impressed his universe colleagues by reading out his Cocoșul roșu ("Red Rooster"), which also usurped the literary canons of socialist realism. As noted by Dimisianu, Neagu had managed to show his peers that they could write both realistically and beautifully about the lives of peasants, at a time before Marin Preda's signature novels. According to Voncu, he was fast on his way to becoming a herald of Romania's "neo-modernism", "which is to say a break with socialist-realism and a return to the models of interwar modernism". Commentators have also described his writings as a Romanian contribution to "magic realism". They disagree as to whether he was a precursor of the Latin American Boom or an ultimately failed local variant. These contributions were delayed by Neagu's marginal involvement in the youth opposition movement of 1956. Sympathetic to its demands, Neagu reportedly listened in as student leaders Paul Goma and Alexandra Indrieș voiced their support for the restoration of Greater Romania. According to recollections published by eyewitness Irimie Străuț, this would explain why Neagu was for a while "chased out" from editorial offices, and placed under surveillance by the communist secret police, called Securitate.

Cocoșul roșu and other short-prose samples finally appeared in 1959, bound together as Ningea în Bărăgan ("It Was Snowing in the Bărăgan"). This volume was published at Editura Tineretului (in the "toiling peasants' collection"), and carried illustrations by Eugen Mihăescu. Bridging memoir, parable, and elements of the psychological novel, the stories contained therein are seen by Ștefănescu as a commendable form of "traditionalist" and studied prose. Their exact relationship with the still-obligatory standards of socialist realism is a matter of some contention. In a 2004 article, novelist and political commentator Cristian Teodorescu regarded them as subservient to the ideological tenets of communism, though "reconciled" with the expectations of a public that "had had just about enough of propaganda literature." According to scholar Dumitru Micu, these writings still adhered to the formal requirements, with depictions of "class conflict" and borrowings from Sadoveanu and Mikhail Sholokhov's prose. However, Neagu was veering away from "dogmatism" by introducing "unusual story-lines" (evoking the likes of Istrati and Constantin Sandu-Aldea, but also William Faulkner and John Steinbeck), as well as a personal touch—namely, the "poetry of the Bărăgan".

Ștefănescu likewise proposes that Neagu was allowing himself to break out of socialist-realist conventions primarily by selecting "eccentrics" and "weirdos" as his protagonists. The same had been noted earlier by literary theorist Mircea Zaciu—according to him, Neagu formed part of a "new generation" that introduced marginals into the literary canon; for this reason, Neagu, like Teodor Mazilu, Sorin Titel and Dumitru Radu Popescu, managed to infuriate the "dogmatic critics". One story, Zgomotul ("The Noise"), depicted a grocer-turned-counterfeiter who ran a money-making device powered by unwitting shoppers, a boy who overfeeds on stolen cakes, and a physician who steals his grandfather's gold chain, one link at a time. Other pieces have a vague narrative pretext that merely allows Neagu to display his verbal skill—in one such work, the actor Eugen Argova reunites with an old fling, then has sex with her, carefully omitting to inform her that her son has been mauled to death by dogs. The story collections also introduced another characteristic of Neagu's style: "Always and everywhere he seeks what one could call the sweet fruit of writing: a beatified state [emphasis in the original], achieved through an orgy of images. In order to obtain freedom for his luxuriant fantasy, he wears various masks." As a result, all his characters are aspects of the narrative voice.

=== Breakthrough ===
As recounted by Cosașu, a group of nonconformist young writers, including himself and Neagu (but also Ana Blandiana, Cezar Baltag and Țic) was unexpectedly inducted by the Writers' Union of Romania (USR) in 1961—even as the official critics continued to depict them as "dangerous negativists". Revisiting Neagu's career in 2003, critic Marius Chivu noted that he had enjoyed a "rapid ascent into the cultural establishment", and that he had always "ignor[ed] critical amendments (as timid as these were)". A 1964 note in the "most intimate" section of Preda's diaries accuses Neagu, Velea and Stănescu of being shallow and unskilled writers, "indifferent as to the future of our literature", and pliable to the regime's commands (since they are "more obsessed [than their elders] in hierarchies, in accumulating boons and privileges"). As Ștefănescu recounts, he had also perfected a special kind of self-promotion, making vague statements about the manuscripts he was preparing for print, while also reissuing his works in several new editions, which were always reviewed with the same interest by professional columnists. Ningea în Bărăgan was followed by five other collections: Somnul de la amiază ("Afternoon Napping", 1960), Dincolo de nisipuri ("Beyond the Sands", 1962), Cantonul părăsit ("The Deserted Cabin", 1964), Vara buimacă ("A Summer of Stupor", 1967), and a volume specifically for children, Caii albi din orașul București ("The White Horses of Bucharest Town", 1967).

Most of these are seen by Voncu as genuinely good, with an "enormous capacity for expression", and without the "devouring obsession of style" that harmed Neagu's later works. Dincolo de nisipuri drew attention from critics such as Al. Oprea and Ovid S. Crohmălniceanu with its depiction of social upheavals within a dream-like setting, as well as for taking direct suggestions from Romanian folklore and from the staples of neo-romanticism. The eponymous story, set during the acute drought of 1946, reports a conflict over the Buzău waters: desperate, hungry farmers set out to hunt for millers upstream, hoping to break into their secret ponds. It shows them "hatchets raised to their chest, galloping on emaciated nags after the mirage of a silvery stream, and toward the moon itself". Other samples depict a naive servant shooting at communists during the nationalization of his landlord's estate; another story, which critics of the day found to be rather crass and sensationalistic, depicts the love between a prosecutor and a mysterious maiden.

Oprea and other critics were not welcoming of another piece, called Om rău ("Bad Man"), since it its narrative structure seemed unfocused, of marginal interest to anyone but Neagu, and overall a "waste of talent". In Vara buimacă, the standards are closer to those of fantasy literature, prompting critic Monica Lovinescu to suggest that Neagu, like Ștefan Bănulescu, was reconnecting with the interwar trends launched by Mircea Eliade. As she noted in 1968, "each of these novellas has enough material for a novel, and it is only a novel that could provide a frame large enough to fit Fănuș Neagu's outpouring vitality." Writing forty years later, critic Viorel Coman argued that Caii albi was entirely eclipsed by his grown-up stories, and then forgotten by reviewers. He focused his attention of the volume as containing several masterpieces, as well as Neagu's first alter ego; overall, he suggested that Caii albi was similar, in both themes and overall value, to Mihai Eminescu's late-romantic fairy tales.

In September 1963, Secolul 20 magazine featured a short story by Pavel Spasov, translated from the Bulgarian by Neagu and Valentin Deșliu. Alongside Radu Nistor, he was working on a translation of Armando López Salinas' Año tras año, published in 1965. He had debuted as a screenwriter in 1964, when his Lumină de iulie was picked up by director Gheorghe Naghi; as noted by film historian Călin Căliman, Lamotescu-Ornaru was a co-author on this project. It was an instant flop, for which Neagu and Naghi could only agree to blame each other. Filmmaker Lucian Pintilie came to Neagu's defense, noting that his original script had been suffered "18 rewrites and transformations", which had "completely erased its realism and significance." In his own dismissive summary, Căliman recalled that Lumină de iulie had made the Bărgan look like a "postcard". Just months after, Neagu and Velea's other script, Niciodată singur, went into production, and Naghi was again picked as director. Taking in the criticism, he had agreed to enhance the realistic feel of this new film, mainly by closely studying both the screenplay and the Bărgan life which it depicted. It was ultimately released in 1966, as Vremea zăpezilor ("A Time for Snows"). The same year, Neagu and Lamotescu-Ornaru co-wrote a play, Apostolii ("The Apostles").

In 1965, Neagu inspired Băieșu to establish the youth magazine Amfiteatru, and was hired as one of its regulars—but allegedly showed up for meetings only on payday. According to his own recollections, he was spending that period, and overall some eight years of his life, working as an editor at Tînărul Scriitor and its successor, Luceafărul. His colleague for this entire interval was poet Petru Vintilă, who also accompanied him on drinking escapades and courted the same women. On one occasion, they got bored of sifting through the 18,000 letters to the editor, which they found to be devoid of any literary value. They proceeded to burn them all, creating an incident that resulted in their salaries being halved by the magazine's head editor, Mihu Dragomir. Still at Luceafărul in 1967, Neagu also found parallel employment as secretary of the Bucharest Writers' Association, where he trafficked in favors for aspiring authors. In his twin capacities, he became a protector of a much younger provincial writer, Mircea Dinescu, who shared both his Bărăgan origin and his passion for "classical" storytelling. He also helped launch Ion Cristoiu's literary career, though he may never have been aware of this—he published in Luceafărul a short story that Cristoiu had penned under a pseudonym.

=== Îngerul a strigat and Princepele affair ===
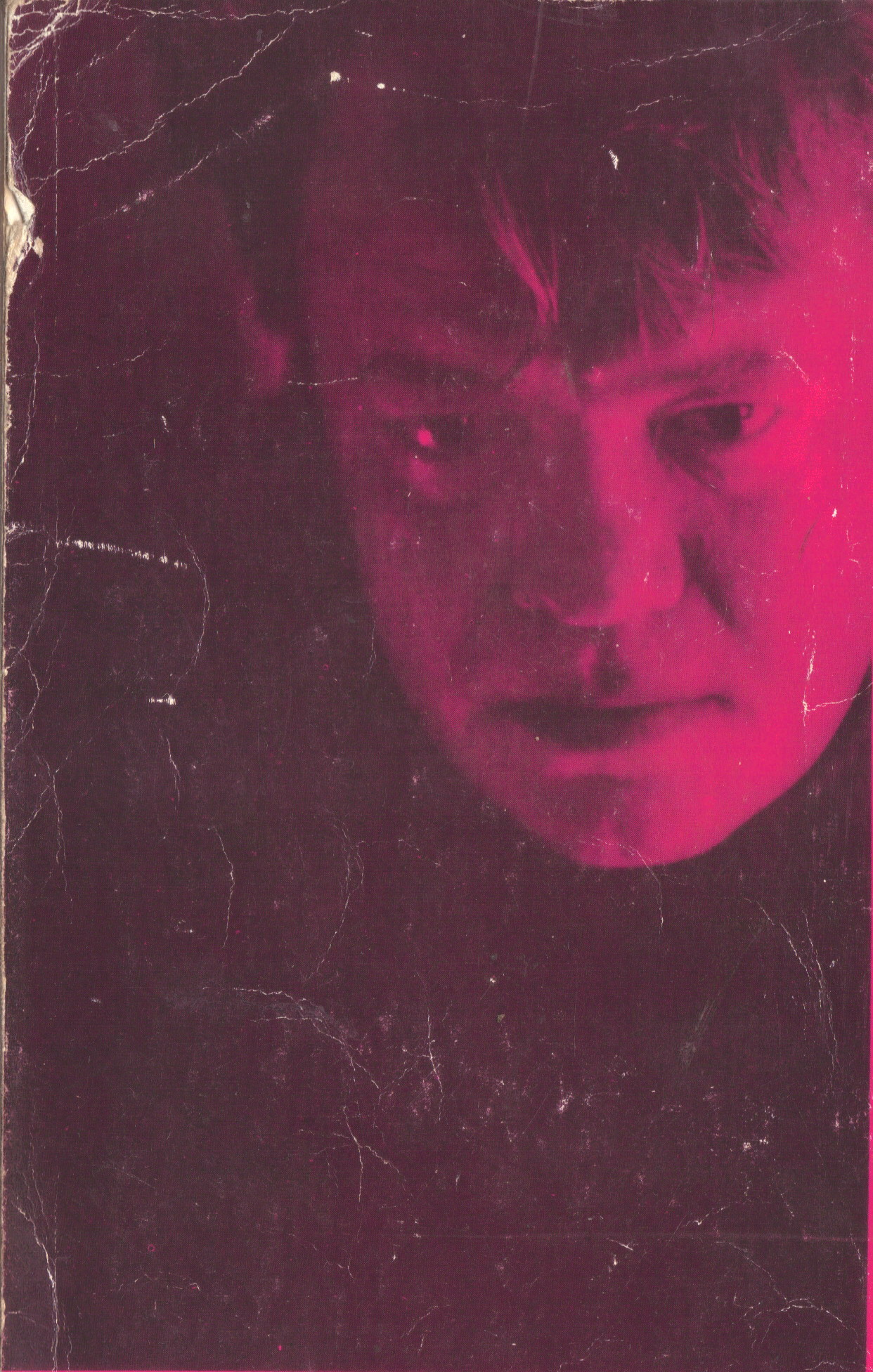
Neagu's portrait on the cover of Îngerul a strigat, 1968 edition

In 1968, after the critics had lost hope that he would ever live up to his promises, Neagu published his first novel, Îngerul a strigat ("The Angel Has Shouted"). According to Micu's summary, the narrative brings together scattered elements: the Bildungsroman of an anti-hero, Ion Mohreanu; the "tribal poem" of Mohreanu's rural society; and "some elements of a sociological epic". Poet Gheorghe Tomozei sees this moment as inaugurating Neagu's complete break with "traditional prose", and his transition into a "distinguished poet", albeit one who never wrote actual verse. Also according to Tomozei:

He brings in all sort of things that please him in 20th-century literature (the oniric halo, the 'absurdist' phrasing), and calmly constructs that brilliant otherness of his prose [Tomozei's emphasis].

In a 1996 piece, scholar Ioana Pârvulescu saw the book as an incidental document of Neagu's ideological emancipation as well: the first chapters, which were probably written down in the previous decade, describe immaculately moral peasants in their conflict with the landowners; as the narrative progresses, the focus switches on the criminal underworld of Brăila, which Neagu depicts with taboo-breaking gusto. Pârvulescu notes that the novel, especially with its epilogue (which includes a near-explicit critique of 1950s communism), reflects the terms of his successful negotiations with the censors, during the peak of de-Stalinization in Romania.

Speaking for the openly anti-communist diaspora, Lovinescu praised the novel, alongside similar works by Preda and D. R. Popescu, for exploring at least "fragments of the real past, or of the experienced present." She notes that Neagu introduced his readers to the crimes committed on the Danube–Black Sea Canal, to a "world of unfair denunciations and arrests", but only through "hints". According to Lovinescu, it remained an open question whether the "chiaroscuro of such prison-themed fragments" was a negative contribution by the censors, or a choice made by the self-censoring Neagu. Neagu once reflected that censorship had been unwittingly helpful, by forcing him and his peers to go for "allegorical literature", which required of them that they "polish [their] style." In parallel, he circulated a legend according to which Îngerul a strigat had an "uncensored" form, attacking the fundamental doctrines of the Romanian Communist Party. Teodorescu doubts that this version ever existed. He notes instead that the published text was remarkably tame, at a time when other writers were allowed to publish clear-cut revelations about "what the regime had done during the first years of communism." This view is contrasted by Voncu, who upholds Îngerul a strigat as one of the few 1960s novels that featured no "socialist-realist residues", and that made no effort to praise the regime for liberalizing itself. Historian Dennis Deletant proposes that the novel was a byproduct of communist liberalization, "the vitality of literary debate [as] engendered by Party pronouncements."

Upon its publication, the work garnered accolades from the literary establishment. It received an annual USR prize, managing to upstage one of Alexandru Ivasiuc's conventionally Marxist novels. It established Neagu's reputation as a literary great, and was welcomed with an enthusiastic article by Cornel Regman. In it, Regman mocked other literary professionals for having mistrusted Neagu. In his own retrospective of 1968 titles, Lucian Raicu commended Îngerul a strigat as a "spectacular surpassing" of narrated everyday events, "toward the fabulous, the unsettling cosmic generalizations, though never abdicating from the unforgiving, 'realistic', principle." Neagu was the credited writer on Ion Niță's comedy film, Zile de vară ("Summer Days"). Released in May 1968 with a cast that included Jean Constantin, it was lambasted by Căliman as inexplicably bad, giving viewers a "feeling of shame" for having stayed through it. Neagu then returned with more stories, grouped as În văpaia lunii ("In the Moon's Glow"), appearing at Editura Minerva in 1971, and as Fîntîna ("The Fountain"), put out in 1974 by Scrisul Românesc. A play called Echipa de zgomote ("The Noise-making Team"), which first appeared in 1970, showed an entire family of starving Foley artists. Neagu had also produced a second and final collection of stories for children, the 1971 Casa care se leagănă ("Trembling House").

Neagu's travels took him to Vădeni, where he was stranded during the massive floods of May 1970. By his own account, he survived for "a few days and nights" on the roof of a local cannery—with "millions of cans" floating around him, and sharing his living space with a group of local workers and a feral wolf. During his stays in Bucharest, he engaged in a publicized polemic with rival Eugen Barbu, accusing Barbu of having plagiarized in his historical novel, Princepele. The scandal was partly sparked by the novel's content, since one of its more "grotesque" protagonists was a caricature of Neagu. Barbu, who had openly acknowledged that Principele was intertextual, announced in April 1970 that he was suing Neagu for libel. The two parties reconciled after their case was handled by one of Bucharest's arbitral tribunals. Overall, Neagu's accusations had failed to impress the public, who opted to endorse Barbu's methods; when Barbu was eventually exposed for more clear-cut plagiarism offenses, Neagu had become his friend, and was defending him publicly. Reflecting back on the issue in 1982, Barbu observed that:

the polemic I had with Fănuș Neagu [...] only served to draw us closer, rather than set us against each other. Given his linguistic genius, he could only have loved me, but the wicked and the eunuchs were pushing him to take a bite out of me. Later, we embraced one another.

Neagu's irreverent take on politics became more public during that stage of his career, especially after Nicolae Ceaușescu had emerged as communist leader and national president. During the mid-to-late 1960s, government had relaxed its hold on society, though it continued to spy on its citizens through the Securitate. The latter reported that Neagu was instigating other writers (including Bănulescu, Dimisianu and Constantin Țoiu), to stage a public protest against communist potentate and writer Dumitru Popescu-Dumnezeu, whom they perceived as liable to clamp down on their free expression. Starting with the July Theses of 1971, national-communism, as a policy hinging on Ceaușescu's commands, curbed liberalization and demanded full obedience from the community of writers. As Lovinescu notes, Neagu seemed unaware of the dangers this posed, and participated in at least one squabble that seemed to facilitate Ceaușescu's designs for total control; in 1972, he and Adrian Păunescu were bitterly fighting each other over who would take over as Luceafărul's new editor-in-chief. A similar point is made by Deletant, who notes that Neagu's rage over the issue was politically significant: "[he] left the opposition camp and aligned himself with Eugen Barbu, one of the few supporters of [Ceaușescu's] proposals." The incident was also retold by Păunescu himself, who reported that Neagu had secured backing from Zaharia Stancu of the USR, and was therefore illegally appointed as the second editor. He and Neagu were able to reunite as friends, but only from 1977.

=== Football writing and Frumoșii nebuni ===
Neagu was by then ostensibly passionate about football, which he covered with sports editorials in literary magazines—România Literară, and then Luceafărul itself. Crafted into prose poems partly based on political lampoons by Tudor Arghezi, his contributions made him immensely popular, beyond the fame enjoyed by any other Romanian author of his time. He himself toned down praise, insisting that he had primarily taken up the job because it allowed him to travel abroad, something which would otherwise have been prohibited under communism. While engaging in this activity, Neagu proceeded to make more or less public shows of his annoyance with the regime. Mocking Ceaușescu as "Balconetti", he also made risky assertions about which of his peers was spying on the others for the Securitate. As noted by fellow journalist Dumitru Graur: "Nobody [around him] could muster the nerve to even react to this." He was a card-carrying member of the Communist Party, but, by his own definition in a 1995 interview, he also acted as a "troublemaker" (scandalagiu), rating himself as more courageous than outside opponents. Dramatist Mircea Radu Iacoban credits a rumor according to which the Securitate "grew tired of even reporting on his mischief", with no new records made in his dossier during the 1980s.

Teodorescu opines instead that Neagu had secured his protection by always being biased in favor of Dinamo, which was sponsored by the Securitate and the state militia. During the Ceaușescu era, Neagu was honored regularly, being anthologized in Biblioteca pentru toți ("on principle reserved for contemporary classics"). Thanks in large part to the efforts a young literary historian, Nicolae Manolescu, Neagu was also included in literary textbooks aimed at schoolchildren. Censorship still interfered with his work, including his contributions to cinema. In 1972, the comedy film Adio, dragă Nela, done by Cornel Todea from Neagu's screenplay, and unusually starring poet Dan Deșliu in what was supposed to be his breakthrough role, was altogether banned from cinemas. According to cinematographer Dumitru Fernoagă, this was for the best, since Neagu's script was merely a collection of "idiotic jokes". Neagu, who blamed the affair on Popescu-Dumnezeu's machinations, supported the Securitate in its simmering conflict with Paul Goma, who had served time in prison after the 1956 events. Also in 1972, Neagu publicly declared that Goma had no literary talent—a statement that the Securitate case officer felt compelled to regard as exaggerated. Neagu similarly served the regime's case against another writer, Nicolae Breban, who had gone public with his critique of the July Theses. He "maligned [Breban] as having a poor grasp of the Romanian language and as a traitor of the party/motherland."

Neagu's football-inspired pieces appeared as two volumes: Cronici de carnaval ("Carnival Chronicles", 1972), and Cronici afurisite sau Poeme cîntate aiurea ("Bastard Chronicles or Poems I Dropped Here and There", 1977); reportedly, they "only lasted in bookshops for a couple of hours", being almost instantly sold out. Neagu had hopes of turning Îngerul a strigat and Dincolo de nisipuri into a single feature film, for which he wrote the screenplay (named after the novella, rather than the novel); it was finally used for production by filmmaker Radu Gabrea, in 1974. In 2017, critic Marina Constantinescu revisited the film as one of Gabrea's great accomplishments, also praising Neagu for agreeing to rewrite "scene after scene, in the expressive language of cinema." Another retrospective review was provided by Căliman, who recalled that the international press, which had seen the film played as part of the Directors' Fortnight, rated it as the most important one coming out of Romania during the decade; Căliman also mentions that, during post-production, Gabrea had "struggled against the stiff opposition of censors". Neagu also wrote Casa de la miezul nopții ("A Midnight Home"), filmed in 1975 by Gheorghe Vitanidis; the author himself appeared in it as a secondary character, Taliverde. At the time, he and Tatiana Nicolescu were collaborating on translating Georgi Markov's epic Sibir', which they published in two volumes (1976, 1984).

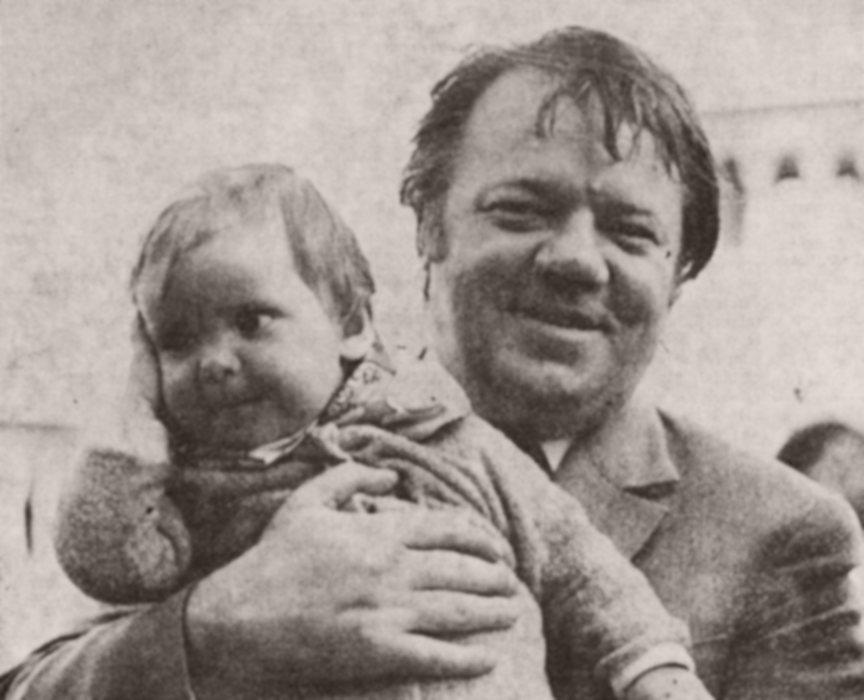
With daughter Anita Ruxandra, 1972

The success of Îngerul a strigat was replicated, then surpassed, by Neagu's 1976 novel, Frumoșii nebuni ai marilor orașe ("Those Beautiful Lunatics of the Great Cities"). Much of its commercial success was attributable to Dinamo fans, who bought the book after being told that it was largely about their favorite team; midfielder Cornel Dinu, who was Neagu's good friend (and, from 1977, also his godson) inspired the central protagonist, Eduard Valdara. In some fragments, the narrative also stands as a thinly-disguised portrayal of the 1950s literary scene, as experienced directly by the author himself. At a deeper level, the work, defined by Zaciu as one of "parodic realism", was essentially intertextual and closely mirrored Mateiu Caragiale's classic, Craii de Curtea-Veche—down to striving for the exact same number of pages and mentioning similar landmarks in Lipscani. It is described by essayist Nicolae Steinhardt as a "radioactive" companion to Caragiale's "chemically stable" writing (or what Ulysses is to the Odyssey). In a 1976 chronicle, Ion Lotreanu suggests that Frumoșii nebuni was not at all a novel, and merely had the "appearance of an epic writing." As Lotreanu puts it:

A lyrical net is cast, like some sort of a trance, over the book's vaporous image. The world is seen through colored glass. Its author believes (one senses) that writing beautifully, expressively, carries more artistic weight than any commonplace epics.

The same reviewer finds that the text is excessive in its metaphors, being entertaining throughout, like a "perpetual dream"; its "allusive langue" evokes 19th-century stories by Ion Creangă, but is innovative for being adapted to a modern, urban setting, in which the heroes are "footballers, crooners, fun-seeking girls". In rendering the protagonists' speech, Neagu also relies on the Levantine and Romani layers of the Romanian lexis, veering into what Steinhardt describes as the "most aggressive slang".

Frumoșii nebuni differs from Craii in several major ways, including by making the central figures more approachable and direct. This characteristic is highlighted by Steinhardt, who describes them as "furious", "like the heroes portrayed by John Osborne." Voncu goes further, proposing that the "anarchic" novel has a purely superficial resemblance to Craii, and is instead based on the "more modest" works of Ionel Teodoreanu. He sees the work as elevated by its secondary, "dystopian", message, which ridicules communist totalitarianism and again alludes to its crimes against individual freedoms. Though identifying and listing influences from Caragiale, Creangă, and E. Barbu, as well as from Gabriel García Márquez, Lotreanu rates Neagu as "one of our most original writers". Re-reading the work in 2013, critic Cosmin Ciotloș was still impressed by its "high-grade aestheticism", and especially by Neagu's ability to portray his characters using faux descriptors, that "cannot coagulate objectively." For instance, Tudor Fluture, who organizes a chase for dogs (which forms a central element of the plot), is presented as "perfectly resembl[ing] a dog whose nape is being bitten by another dog."

=== Cartea cu prieteni years ===
In the mid-1970s, Neagu continued to test the regime's tolerance for dissent. He once approached Foreign Minister George Macovescu, who had frozen permission for writers to travel abroad when one of their colleagues defected to England, if he planned on doing the same for Securitate spies, one of whom had opted to give himself up in Norway. At some point during that decade, Neagu had a chance meeting with Géza Szőcs, the Hungarian Romanian poet. The two got along after Szőcs confessed that Hungarians still pined for Transylvania, allowing Neagu to view him as an "honest man." They then played a game in which Neagu would sign off Transylvanian cities to Hungary, in exchange for shots of vodka. Onlookers thought that Neagu was being provocative, though Szőcs speculated that he was actually mocking Ceaușescu's propaganda, which had it that "in the depths of every Hungarian's soul is the cherished idea of revenge". Around the time of Frumoșii nebuni's publication, Neagu was making shows of his support for the party line. In December 1977, alongside Barbu, Lotreanu and Preda, he expressed solidarity with the regime, against the dissident movement launched by Goma; the list of allegiances, which was kept in the Securitate archive, also included Constantin Abăluță, Leon Kalustian, Zigu Ornea, and Dan Zamfirescu.

The Securitate proposed to use both Neagu and Mircea Dinescu for a plan to undermine Goma's credibility abroad. Neagu was however involved in a move to protect Goma's ally, Ion Negoițescu, who had been jailed by the Securitate; at the USR, he and Stănescu, alongside Crohmălniceanu, staged a protest which resulted in Negoițescu being granted parole. As argued by Voncu, in the 1980s Neagu belonged to a "grey area of literature", also populated by Ioan Alexandru and Constantin Noica. These authors served to legitimize a nucleus of extreme national-communists—including Barbu, Paul Anghel and Corneliu Vadim Tudor—and their theories about "Protochronism". Voncu also notes that Neagu and the others were exploited by the Barbu group, but without ever joining the Protochronist caucus. In May 1980, Neagu was shortlisted for the top managerial position at Cartea Românească publishers. This perplexed his would-be employee, Zaciu, who noted that Neagu "simply did not fit the job description", for having no university diploma to his name.

At around the same time, the novelist involved himself in a publicized polemic with Geo Bogza, the communist intellectual and former avant-garde author. Neagu and other members of Barbu's circle had been infuriated by Bogza's decision to republish one of his earlier texts, which featured his mockery of Arghezi. Neagu sought to harm his rival by republishing pornographic and rebellious, unpatriotic fragments from Bogza's youthful writings, within a lampoon in Flacăra. Zaciu notes that the "perfidious" piece, written in such a way that Neagu could not be sued for defamation, had been personally approved by the communist potentate Eugen Florescu, meaning that "nobody will take action [against Neagu], for fear." One exception was the literary scholar Mircea Iorgulescu, intervening through an article in România Literară. Iorgulescu deplored Neagu's transformation into a "rudimentary and libelous publicist", whose "deplorable notoriety" in attacking Bogza risked matching those of Caion and Sorin Toma. Over the following months, Neagu intervened in the conflict tearing apart the USR: he supported Nicolae Dragoș, a national-communist, for the position of USR president, and, on 26 August, attended a meeting with the communist leadership. He and others among Dragoș's supporters asked Ceaușescu to impose a new USR charter, which would have brought it under the party's control.

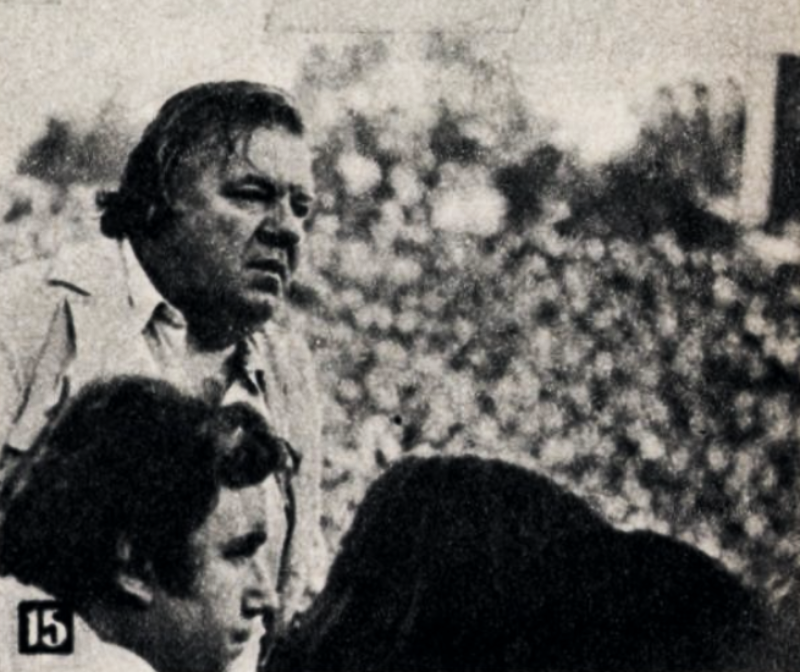
With colleague Adrian Păunescu at a Dinamo match in 1981

In 1979, Editura Sport-Turism had published Neagu's volume of biographical profiles, as Cartea cu prieteni ("The Book of Friends"), with illustrations by Dan Hatmanu. Neagu persevered as a playwright, and in early 1980 his Scoica de lemn ("Wooden Seashell") was staged by Nottara Theater, with a cast which included Ștefan Radof and Florian Pittiș. Dan Nasta, who directed it, was impressed by the work as a sample of "poetic drama", centered on myths about a "sunken church" in the Dobrujan soil; Micu describes this imagery as a "metaphor of illusion". Reviewer Mircea Ghițulescu welcomed the merger between Neagu and Nasta's competing forms of the "playful spirit", while suggesting that the former had his verbose metaphors toned down by the latter. Ghițulescu speculated that "Fănuș Neagu's original need to write in drama form must have been a need to hear his words, his so very beautiful word associations, spoken out on the stage." Having already published Faulknerian translations before 1973, Neagu returned to this activity in 1980: together with Florica Dulceanu, he produced a well-received translation of Georges Rodenbach's Bruges-la-Morte, published by Editura Univers (and illustrated by Sabin Bălașa). In 1986, Neagu and Puiu Brăileanu completed a version of Pavlo Zahrebelnyi's Acceleration (as Vîntul de seară).

In 1981, Neagu put out a collection of articles, Insomnii de mătase ("Silken Sleeplessness"), dismissed by Voncu as a purely commercial endeavor. That year, Neagu and Lamotescu-Ornaru collaborated with each other, and with director Manole Marcus, on another film project, Punga cu libelule. It was inspired by the 1940s resistance movement and had an ensemble cast (Victor Rebengiuc, Ion Caramitru, Enikő Szilágyi, Dan Condurache, Gheorghe Visu, Marcel Iureș). Critic Alice Mănoiu gave the result a mixed review, noting that its over-the-top, "esperpento", approach, was "hardly bearable", though the actors' collective talent had managed to salvage it. Another reviewer, Nicolae Ulieru, gave Punga an all-positive review, in particular for its "successful enlargement of the meaning one usually ascribes to the notion of anti-fascist combatant [Ulieru's italics]". Over those months, the two screenwriters were also working with another filmmaker, Iosif Demian, resulting in 1982's Baloane de curcubeu ("Rainbow Balloons")—with Dorel Vișan as the head of a collective farm, slowly piecing together the backstory of his estranged and cheating wife. Căliman calls it "en exciting film, centered on the motley world that bridges village and city".

=== Under late-stage communism ===
Again alongside Lamotescu-Ornaru, Neagu had finished writing on Lișca, the story of a World War II widow (based on a real-life Romani lady from Tichilești) and her descent into madness. Filmed by Ioan Cărămăzan and released in mid-1984, it was welcomed by critic Eva Sîrbu, who reserved praise for both the script and for Ecaterina Nazare's performance in the title role. The same three-man team worked on the 1987 romance film Sania albastră ("The Blue Sled"), which reviewers of the day described as unsatisfactory. Neagu alone worked with Geo Saizescu on the lyrical, "savory comedy" Sosesc păsările călătoare, drawing praise in particular for his writing of the female lead role (assigned by Saizescu to Tora Vasilescu). Also that year, his Cantonul părăsit was adapted into an experimental drama film by Adrian Istrătescu Lener.

A number of Neagu's travel stories appeared as Pierdut în Balcania ("Lost in Balkan Land"); released by Editura Sport-Turism in 1982, this volume included a portrait of Neagu, by Constantin Piliuță. Ioan Holban of Convorbiri Literare described it as one of the major accomplishments in Romanian short prose of the early 1980s, noting its main trait and stylistic appeal: "the elements of myth and folkloric tradition become literature." In early 1985, he published a second installment of Cartea cu prieteni. Chronicler Radu G. Țeposu remarked its "tragic indictment" of socialist realism, but was overall unimpressed by its "metaphoric delirium", since "beautiful images are stifled by a purely decorative style." Also then, Neagu released his only volume of lyric poetry, as Poeme răsărite-n iarbă ("Poems Sprouting in the Grass"), and had another play, Olelie, titled after the Romanian equivalent of "oyez" shouting, or hăulit. It was produced for Nottara by Ion Cojar, and was carried by the two lead actors, George Constantin and Horațiu Mălăele.

In 1987, Neagu was working on a re-release of Casa de la miezul nopții—this time as a play, commissioned to him by Bulandra Theater—and also on Golful de plumb ("A Gulf of Lead"), inspired by the 1970 floods, and shortlisted for production by Nottara. He had by then completed and published at Cartea Românească a third novel, Scaunul singurătății ("Chair of Solitude"), whose title was a reference to a piece of furniture once used by a eunuch of the Ottoman court. The book was presented as the third part of a cycle, after Îngerul a strigat and Frumoșii nebuni, and also as a synthesis of events from the 1944–1970 interval. Though including himself among Neagu's admirers, Nicolae Turtureanu saw this as definitive proof that Neagu's "metaphorism overshadows the epic line", agreeing with others that the novel as a whole was bad. Teodorescu sees it as Neagu's worst, "nearly illegible", contribution, but adds:

Those who fell for the "great craftsman" could not allow themselves to tell him outright that his novel was a dud. If Fănuș got away with this, it was also because [Ceaușescu] had no appetite for literary scandals.

In 1989, Editura Eminescu published a companion piece to Pierdut în Balcania as Povești din drumul Brăilei ("Stories of the Road to Brăila"). It was similarly panned by Manolescu for its "excess" in detailing the picturesque and also for its "linguistic kitsch". Manolescu adds: "If not his intuition then at least his experience should have prevented Fănuș Neagu from childishly mucking up so many stories that could have otherwise been anthology-worthy."

In 1985, Neagu hissed off the junior writer Dorin Tudoran, who had secured a US visa and had no intention of returning from the trip; during their exchange, he implied that Tudoran was a traitor to his country. The following year, Securitate informants revealed that Neagu himself had been critical of the far-reaching austerity policies ordered by the president. According to such sources, he showed up inebriated for an USR meeting, and proceeded to ad-lib about the gas and light being randomly turned off in his home, and about mandatory servings of oceanic fish in restaurants that lacked other, more prestigious, dishes. Neagu collected his final volume of football sketches and reportage pieces, as Întâmplări aiurea și călătorii oranj ("Stories of Elsewhere and Orange Travels"). It bridged gonzo journalism and political satire, describing the food shortages faced by a football team and its press officers. Such incidents resulted in the Securitate taking some additional interest: from December 1986, Neagu and his former associate Dinescu were kept under special observation, being both influenced and threatened by undercover agents. During the late 1980s, the novelist was expressing support for the national-communist approach to the Hungarian minority, now seen by Ceaușescu as a privileged class that needed to be contained. During a trip to Denmark, Neagu mocked an interviewer, telling her that, had he not been a writer, he would have fancied being a Hungarian in Romania; upon returning, he recounted his "wonders and mischief" to his Romanian colleagues at Neptun, within earshot of Ceaușescu's villa, possibly because he had "permission from above".

=== Regime change and TNB tenure ===
The Romanian Revolution of December 1989 lifted censorship, but, as literary scholars argue, also undermined Neagu's popularity—since he was no longer "fashionable", and since his target audience no longer cared for culture. He initially joined in the anti-communist trend, proposing that "Securitate" be spelled in lowercase. He reportedly became quickly disgusted by the new approaches to sports' journalism, prompting him to renounce his contributions in this field; however, he remained active in cultural and political journalism, managing a number of periodicals—including Literatorul, launched in 1991 as a collaboration between Neagu, Tomozei, Eugen Simion, and Marin Sorescu. Immediately after the Revolution, he was made editor-in-chief of Țara daily, which represented the Democratic Agrarian Party (PDAR). A political column in Orizont magazine described him as the PDAR's third most important figure, after Victor Surdu and David Ohanesian, also describing his Țara editorials as primarily shielding the party from uncomfortable questions about its financing (under his watch, that newspaper eventually filed for bankruptcy). Soon after the 1990 ethnic clashes in Transylvania, he was contributing to Barbu's Viața Capitalei, with agitatorial articles which claimed that "Hungarians are playing football with the severed heads of Romanian policemen". Barbu, who later established the far-right Greater Romania Party, was expelled from the USR for both his history of plagiarism and his attacks on other writers. Neagu was vocal in opposing the move, during a heated debate which again pitted him against Geo Bogza.

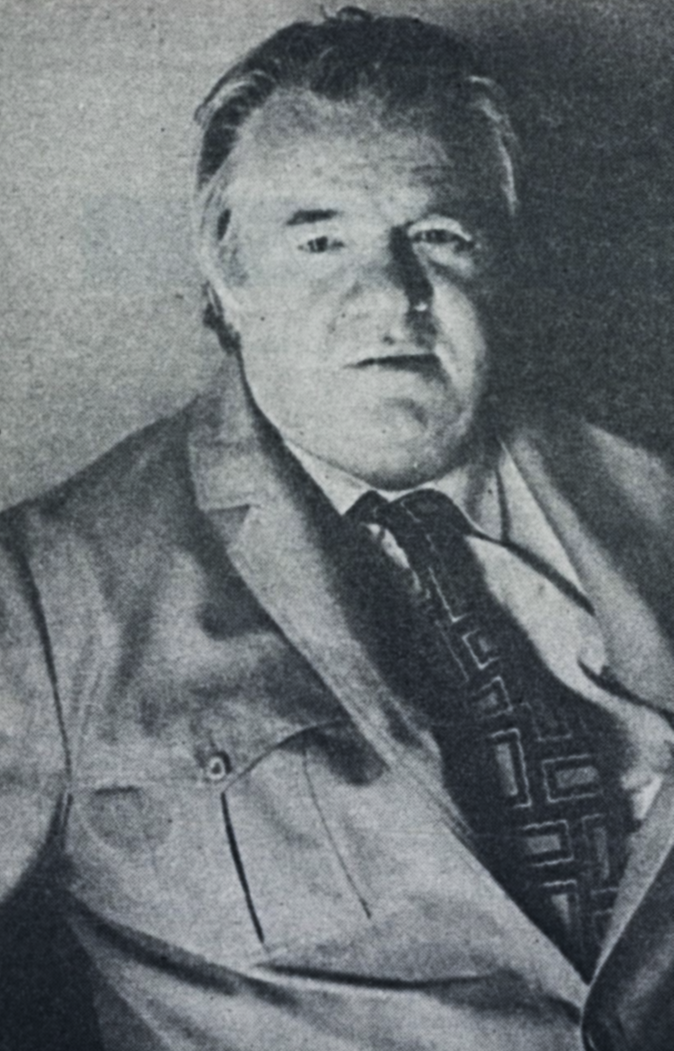
Neagu in 1989

For their work at Literatorul, Neagu and Sorescu received awards "of encouragement" from Păunescu's new literary club, Totuși Iubirea. They both declined the honors as a "joke", indicating their contempt for that institution. As read by Ciotloș, Neagu's political journalism became "acid and unjust, but inconsistent". It was generally carried by "spontaneous" opinions or "moods", making his stances unpredictable. With time, he became "entirely cut off from current affairs, either in Romania or anywhere else", dismissing virtually all younger authors as "counter-cultural", collecting minute details about the provincial literary scene, and praising the Romanians' timeless "cultural myths" (in pages that are rated by Ciotloș as a "nadir of his writing"). In June 1991, the national television network aired Vartan Arachelian's interview with Neagu, in which the latter argued that Romania's wartime dictator, Ion Antonescu, was not responsible for the Iași pogrom of 1941, and produced allegations against Romania's Chief Rabbi, Moses Rosen. In early 1992, România Liberă daily hosted some of his op-eds, which outlined his critique of former anti-communist dissidents, including both Dinescu and journalist Octavian Paler. The staff writers at România Literară viewed these as embarrassing for Neagu, since he now held "the same opinions as those being launched by the Securitate." The novelist had claimed that Dinescu was subservient to his Hungarian and Jewish in-laws, and suggested that Paler, a "spy of communism", should have been jailed.

Neagu was overall a committed supporter of Ion Iliescu, who became Romania's first post-revolutionary president. His stance alienated several of his writer friends, who found Iliescu's politics unpalatable. The new regime contrasted the public's indifference by awarding him several public accolades. He is therefore seen by Teodorescu as a pampered figure of that era, still "riding high" after Ceaușescu's demise. Defending Neagu in 1993, Tomozei celebrated him as a "solitary figure", carving his own way under old regime just as under "the newly imposed tyranny of the revolutionaries". He added: "Always surrounded by a procession of admirers (poets, painters, jobless bards, paper-pushers, peddlers of sports), Fănuș Neagu is nevertheless a lonely man." In November of that year, Neagu was elected a corresponding member of the Romanian Academy.

From December 1993, and down to 1996, the novelist was also chairman of the National Theater Bucharest (TNB). The latter appointment was given a negative coverage by journalist Florica Ichim. She described his as a political move by Literatorul's Sorescu, who was serving as Minister of Culture (and who had allegedly pressured Andrei Șerban, the previous chairman, into resigning). Such interpretations were partly confirmed by Sorescu's deputy, Mihai Ungheanu, who confirmed that Șerban was disliked for not showcasing Romanian dramatists in a publicly-funded venue. Ungheanu added: "we expect changes from the new director, Fănuș Neagu." Ichim also noted that Neagu had a questionable reputation, making him unqualified for the job. Dinu Cernescu, who served as assistant director of the TNB in 1994, reports instead that Neagu and himself found supporters on the artistic scene, including Radu Beligan and Florin Piersic. Neagu confessed to Iacoban, who had served in a similar position at the National Theater Iași, that he did not feel entirely adequate for this assignment. Iacoban believes that he was right:

anybody could see that the new general director had no calling for this administrative post; if he lasted there for almost three years, it was only because of his intelligence.

During his tenure, Neagu strove to produce a play about the life and times of poet Mihai Eminescu, but never managed to. His contribution as a manager was tinged by several scandals, provoked by his public stances. During March 1994, he paid public homage to General Ion Coman, who had been jailed for his role in violently quelling the anti-Ceaușescu protests of 1989. Neagu presented Coman only as a patron of Romanian football, adding: "he has to get back into prison now, for reasons that elude me." In May of that year, Neagu also announced that Eugène Ionesco, the self-exiled Romanian playwright, had demanded to have one of his final plays staged exclusively by the TNB. Such claims were refuted by Ionesco's wife and daughter, who further accused Neagu of having circulated a forged letter.

Neagu's new selection of stories, Partida de pocher ("A Poker Game"), was printed in 1995, alongside and a final version of Casa de la miezul nopții. Ningea în Bărăgan was adapted into a 1992 film, Casa din vis ("The House of Dreams"), with Cărămăzan as director and Maia Morgenstern as the female lead. Neagu himself made another appearance as an actor in the 1994 period-comedy film Crucea de piatră (directed by Andrei Blaier from a screenplay by Titus Popovici); in it, he was cast as a heavy-drinking Red Army general, invited in to inspect Bucharest's brothels. He was applauded for his performance in a role which "fit him like a glove, according to the more spiteful of commentators." He made a final return as a screenwriter on Terente, regele bălților, directed by Blaier and released in September 1995 (the project, romanticizing the story of an infamous interwar bandit, had also involved Cărămăzan and Dan Pița). It was singled out by film columnist Valerian Sava as one of the worst cinema projects to have been financed by the Romanian state, and as "ridiculously at odds with history".

=== Cronica Română years ===
During 1996, Neagu was implicated in a scandal over Marea năpîrlire ("The Great Shedding"), a political comedy penned by Vasile Rebreanu and staged by the National Theater Cluj. The local press published an interview of his, which had him praising Rebreanu as a major dramatist; this was especially controversial, since Marea năpîrlire propagandized for Iliescu's Social Democrats, while also attacking another anti-communist, Doina Cornea. Neagu argued that he had been misquoted. In his retraction, he depicted Rebreanu as "a lisping, tiresome [author], and moreover a servant of the now-extinct Ceaușescu family." He himself was ultimately forced out of the TNB by a new Minister of Culture, Caramitru, who represented the center-right Democratic Convention. Dismissing Caramitru as a mere actor who belonged "on the plank of stages or the plank that one walks on at the very end", he refused to hand in his resignation, and remained in office until May 1997, when Caramitru organized a competition for the post. Neagu declined to participate, but also stepped down voluntarily. That year, his final volume of short prose appeared as O corabie spre Bethleem ("A Ship to Bethlehem"), under contract with Cartea Românească. He also returned as a translator in 1998, when he and Aurora Leicand produced a Romanian version of Faulkner's Mansion.

During the TNB controversy's final portion, Neagu declared himself "a free man", who would go on to "speak my mind". In March 1996, he had launched his own weekly, România Magazin, which had Ilie Purcaru as the editor-in-chief. He continued to serve in a similar position at Literatorul, registering the brand with Floarea Albastră publishers. This pitted him against the USR, which regarded Literatorul as its own publication. In February 1998, the Union declared his position vacant, and organized a competition to fill it; Neagu, backed by his editorial staff, implied that the move was illegal, and refused to either step down or present himself in the contest. He was a guest panelist at other newspapers, including Jurnalul Național. In January 2000, the latter hosted his article on the Hungarian–Romanian disputes in Harghita and Covasna—it was criticized by Covasna's Romanians because Neagu had failed to fully research the story, and had mistaken a Hungarian official for a Romanian one. In February 2001, Horia Alexandrescu gave up his position as managerial director of Cronica Română daily, and Neagu took over (heading an editorial team that also included Voncu, Aristide Buhoiu, and George Cușnarencu). Though styling itself an "independent publication", it was largely supportive of the Social Democratic establishment. His output for that newspaper included political pieces expressing his Euroscepticism, which was predicated on the belief that "Europe does not want us", and that "Romania had better be looking for an alternative."

Neagu had lost his position at Literatorul in June 2000: he had withdrawn his complaint against his ministry-appointed replacement Gheorghe Grigurcu, but at a time when the magazine had suspended publication and was verging on bankruptcy. Controversy was stirred again in October 2001, when writer Costi Rogozanu discovered that Literatorul, which he identified as Neagu's publication, was receiving the largest subsidies afforded by the Ministry of Culture—which was being directed by Răzvan Theodorescu, a Social Democrat. With Neagu approaching the end of his career, various young colleagues had begun disputing his abilities and status. Within this generation, Pârvulescu revisited Îngerul a strigat as a novel of "questionable taste", bordering on "kitsch" (the same verdict was passed by Teodorescu in relation to Frumoșii nebuni). Chivu more conservatively argued that, while Neagu's early novels were salvageable, in his later work he had come to use a "predictable recipe, losing all its taste through continuous overbidding. [...] Almost any prose work by Fănuș Neagu drenches its characters in a mud of vulgar-poetic metaphors, themselves tortured beyond recognition." The aging writer was also impugned as a cronyist for his early-2000s activity at the National Cinema Council, since he had supported the allocation of state funds to his old friends (including Blaier, D. R. Popescu, and Saizescu), while casually ignoring projects submitted by Lucian Pintilie and by anyone associated with the Romanian New Wave. In 2003, he and Blaier granted funds to Gheorghe Preda's project, Îngerul necesar, which sought to restore the standards of communist-era dramas, as an explicit alternative to the New Wave.

In mid-to-late 2001, the dispute between Neagu and younger talents, such as Rogozanu and Luminița Marcu, turned caustic, especially after the latter two stirred up debate about the perishable quality of writers inherited from the communist era. In his overview, novelist Ștefan Agopian suggested that the debate was necessary, but also that those who stood to lose their prestige (including not just Neagu, but also his previous enemies Paler and Nicolae Breban) were too quick to depict themselves as targeted by a "cabal". Neagu attacked Marcu as "that insane woman" during an interview in Luceafărul. Literary columnist Dan C. Mihăilescu observed from the side that the objectors were publicity seekers, who aimed at marginalizing Neagu's position within the national canon. However, he also found Neagu's replies to Marcu as belonging to a disgraceful tradition of lampoons, "mixing paper in with manure". Other lampoons, probably ordered by Neagu, appeared in his Cronica Română. However, as Agopian writes, "given that all people are aware of Fănuș Neagu's disinterest for ideas, and the colorful language which he uses to cover up this defect, nobody even took [him] seriously." Chivu similarly remarked in 2003:

The academician has managed to show, yet again, through his latest outbursts in the press [Chivu's emphasis], that there is a perfect unity of man and oeuvre. [He] had no capacity for understanding that a literary field will now and then tolerate mutations in aesthetics, in values, and finally in hierarchies, a fluctuation that does not in fact engender any one writer being ousted from the History of Literature.

=== Final activities and death ===
On 21 December 2001, Neagu had been made a full member of the Academy. In 2002, he published another one of his own novels, Amantul doamnei Dracula ("Mrs Dracula's Lover"). The narrative is essentially a posthumous libel against Elena Ceaușescu, disguised under the name of "Dia Goia". She is shown in decrepit old age, having lost all self-control—spewing profanities with virtually each sentence she produces, passing gas in front of anyone present, and recounting her lifelong sexual debauchery. Though panned by Marcu and Chivu, Amantul was defended by Ștefănescu as another sample of Neagu's narrative skill. The novelist had made a brief return to football-writing, with columns for ProSport—as Chivu notes, these were no longer interesting, and interchangeable in content. In January 2005, TVR 1 began airing Amantul doamnei Dracula as a serialized television play, with Margareta Pogonat in the lead role. It was reviewed by critic Cezar-Paul Bădescu as an "inebriation with words, of the kind that is so very loved by Fănuș Neagu." Bădescu was alarmed that the series had received lavish public funding, despite being a mix of "kitsch, vulgarity, and aberration"; he also drew attention to the depiction of Romanies, suggesting that the text was veering into racial stereotyping.

In mid-2004, Neagu had refused to be decorated by Iliescu, stating that he "hated them trinkets". According to Teodorescu, the hidden message in this gesture was a snub at Neagu's "declared admirer", getting back at Iliescu for having ignored him for a more significant promotion (the only office still held by Neagu was at Cronica Română, with its "small circulation"). Instead, he cultivated a relationship with the notabilities of Dolj County. This began in June 2001, when Jiul Hotel of Craiova renamed one of its halls after the writer, during a ceremony that he attended alongside his wife Stela. In October 2004, he was made an honorary citizen of Craiova, and attended the inauguration of a Fănuș Neagu Primary School in Caraula. The latter institution also hosts his bust, done by Lucian Irimescu. A final novel, Asfințit de Europă, Răsărit de Asie ("European Sunset, Asian Sunrise") and a first volume of Neagu's Jurnal cu fața ascunsă ("Hidden-face Diary") both appeared in 2005. Voncu believes that such works had little merit, but also that the criticism they received remained grounded in purely political objections. During the promotional tour, Neagu stated his belief in Romanian nationalism, and expanded on the social critique of post-communism. He suggested that an "acute crisis of dignity" was tacitly promoted by the intellectuals, both right- and left-wing, and complained that the proletariat had been "diluted into a class of ignoramuses, tarts, and cadgers" (s-a diluat într-o clasă de semidocți, de paparude și de milogi). Arguing that the more distant past could not serve as a model, since it belonged to a "detestable bourgeoisie", he referred to himself a "man of the left" (though "not a communist").

While writing on Asfințit de Europă, Neagu had purchased at an apartment on Ion Mincu Street 27, in a previously nationalized villa. He was involved in a lengthy litigation with two men, both of whom claimed to have been the rightful inheritors of the dispossessed owners; in June 2006, a court ruled that he had acquired the apartment in good faith, though one of the judges presented a dissenting opinion. In early 2008, Neagu, who had developed gout and was taking allopurinol, checked himself into Bucharest's Elias Hospital, reportedly as a way to monitor his arthritis and his heart disease. Around the same time, the novelist was diagnosed with prostate cancer, which became a "generalized cancer"; he returned for near-constant treatment at Elias. This interval saw him writing in his diary, which covers the period down to 7 May 2011. As remarked by Ciotloș, the dying Neagu provided few details on his own physical suffering, only complaining about it to the measure where it interfered with his literary projects. Portions of the work are therefore explicitly dismissive of Max Blecher's hospital memoirs, which are intentionally written in a tragic tone. Also a political testament, Neagu's final diary reaffirms his commitment to nationalism. This is combined with an interest in some non-Romanian writers, from which he transcribes entire fragments (examples include García Márquez, Saul Bellow, Ian Caldwell, Vladimir Nabokov, and Enzo Siciliano); the notebooks also take a dim view of authors who have experienced success during post-communism (variously including Mircea Cărtărescu, Paul Cornea, Norman Manea, and Herta Müller).

Neagu reportedly continued drinking alcohol even under supervision, and stashed bottles of wine under his hospital bed—as Turtureanu notes, he was not actually addicted, but did not want to spare himself a gourmet's pleasure. His last thoughts were on arranging his own memorial house in Grădiștea, though he also prepared a goodbye text for the sports-page readers, in which he deplored the decline of Romanian football. During his final weeks, he slipped into a coma. He ultimately died of his terminal illness on 24 May 2011, while still at Elias. Asked to comment on the occasion, Agopian called Neagu "the last of his generation's great bohemians", adding: "I don't even know how he lasted for as long as he did..." Overall, as Voncu reports

his passing was engulfed by discretion and indifference, as expressed by a society that responds to the models of another paradigm, a paradigm that differs in both values and morals.

Both his widow Stela and his daughter Anita (known under her married name of Anita Jianu) stood by his body as it was laid in state at the USR house on Calea Victoriei. In addition, the writer was survived by his sister (who had relocated to Piatra Neamț), and by several nieces, all of whom still resided in his home village; Grădiștea sent two busloads of mourners for his funeral. The latter took place on 26 May at Bellu cemetery (in its "Academicians' Alley" allotment). The memorial house was ultimately opened for the public in July 2011. A second part of Jurnal cu fața ascunsă appeared posthumously, in 2014, care of the Museum of Romanian Literature.

== Legacy ==
Upon his arrival on the literary scene, young Neagu was welcomed by Zaharia Stancu as a writer "of the plain", who could help counter the dominance of "men of the mountains" (the latter category included authors from Ion Creangă to Ion Agârbiceanu). Neagu was much admired by poet Nichita Stănescu, who depicts him in one of his pieces as a "gentle, calm and sluggish bear". According to Dimisianu, this portrayal was at least partly inaccurate, "aiming at appearances", since Neagu was in fact quick-tempered and sometimes violent. Likewise, Ștefănescu described the novelist as "massive, blond and freckled, always surly as if after a bender", overall a "picturesque figure on the literary scene." According to a diary entry by the Romanian Jewish poet Nina Cassian, which details her chance encounter with Neagu and Dan Claudiu Tănăsescu in September 1980, the two men pestered and terrorized her for an entire night of "screaming [and] cursing". She calls Neagu a "catastrophe" and an "antisemitic hooligan." As argued in 2009 by Dinu Cernescu, Neagu "love[d] to play the aging churl", but was in fact a consummate aesthete with a lifelong passion for reading.

Neagu's adventures formed the basis of a 2003 book by his fellow novelist and drinking companion, Mircea Micu. According to Chivu, it is an encomium written "without any sort of talent", though showing "Fănuș [as] a no-nonsense man, a sentimental womanizer and lover-boy, an all-knowing sage, slick and skillful, [...] inspired and witty, delicate, generous and altruistic". Oral tradition also depicts Neagu as a smart and irreverent raconteur, remembered for his on-the-spot aphorisms, but also for his acid characterizations of various colleagues, whom he judged through the lens of his own bohemianism. He is believed to have once called footballer Florin Răducioiu "a cretin", because Răducioiu "drinks dessert wine." In old age, he was a regular at La Premiera bar, alongside Crucea de piatră's star actor, Gheorghe Dinică. Reportedly, the two of them joined up for tormenting young journalists who asked for interviews. The new generations of writers, who dismissed him as repetitive or needlessly florid, were seen by Ștefănescu as "essentially unfair, since they forget to mention that was being repeated is a great talent." As reviewed by Ciotloș, Neagu's deathbed aphorisms are as flippant as always, being primarily an illustration of the author's unending commitment to "wine philosophy" (despite his medically-imposed abstinence). Some of his final notes detail his tongue-in-cheek admiration for Dong Dong, a Chinese toddler-turned-alcoholic, whose existence had been revealed to him upon reading a Romanian tabloid. Neagu explains that, "had I not been crippled by cancer", he would be off to meet this "Asiatic warrior" and challenge him to a drinking contest.

Neagu himself was sometimes offended when other professionals failed to welcome him in the terms he used to describe himself. He was reportedly upset with his friend and fellow academician Eugen Simion, despite the latter's expressed enthusiasm for Neagu's prose. When Simion inquired why, Neagu replied: "Will it have hurt your hand to also write that I'm a genius?" As observed by Voncu, the mixture of rejection and indifference continued to plague Neagu's memory in the decade after his death, but not enough to uproot him from the literary canon—he sees this as confirmed by a 2019 survey in România Literară, which saw literary professionals still listing Neagu's novels and novellas as obligatory readings. Though most Romanian institutions still shied away from commemorating the writer, in 2021 a "small cult" of his was still being maintained in Brăila. Writers who embraced Neagu's stylistic guidelines include his friend Tănăsescu, who went as far as to imitate him in his own novellas of youth, and, albeit to a lesser degree, the 1990s novelist Marius Tupan. Revisiting Neagu's potential influence in 2011, Turtureanu was skeptical, observing that:

an age of Romanian prose-writing now reaches its end. It is hard to believe that anyone, at any future time, will ever again write not just as he did, but in similar vein.
