= Ibrianu =

Ibrianu may refer to several villages in Romania:

- Ibrianu, a village in Grădiștea, Brăila
- Ibrianu, a village in Cornești, Dâmbovița
