= Eu sunt Adam =

1996 Romanian film by Dan Pița

- Directed by: Dan Pița
- Written by: based on short stories by Mircea Eliade
- Cinematography: Dan Alexandru
- Music by: Adrian Enescu
- Release date: 1996
- Country: Romania
- Language: Romanian

Eu sunt Adam was a 1996 Romanian film directed by Dan Pița. It is based on Mircea Eliade's stories With the Gypsy Girls, The Old Man and the Bureaucrats and Two Generals' Uniforms.
