= Luxury Hotel =

Hotel de lux Luxury Hotel
- Directed by: Dan Pița
- Written by: Dan Pița
- Starring: Irina Petrescu; Ştefan Iordache; Valentin Popescu
- Release date: 1992
- Running time: 105 minutes
- Country: Romania
- Language: Romanian

Hotel de lux (Luxury Hotel) is a 1992 Romanian film directed by Dan Pița. It won the Silver Lion (Leone d'Argento) at the 49th Venice Film Festival. The film has 105 minute running time and includes several important actors in the Romanian cinema. Irina Petrescu, Valentin Popescu and Ştefan Iordache are key players in the film. The film was selected as the Romanian entry for the Best Foreign Language Film at the 65th Academy Awards, but was not accepted as a nominee.

== Synopsis ==
An ambitious young chief of room (Valentin Popescu) tries to renew the atmosphere of a restaurant located inside a luxury hotel. Inexplicably, his initiatives wake the opposition of his superiors. But penetrating the depth of relations between people involved in this plot comes to light an insidious fabric of lies that prevent the development of a normal life and flourishing. The location of filming was Casa Poporului (Palace of the Parliament now), the giant building from Bucharest.

== Cast ==
- Valentin Popescu – Alex
- Ștefan Iordache – the boss, Alex's father
- Irina Petrescu – Maria, Alex's mother
- Irina Movilă – Sofia, warehouseman
- Alfred Demetriu
- Lamia Beligan – Martha
- Valer Dellakeza
- Marius Stănescu – Laurențiu
- Simona Bondoc
- Ileana Popescu – Alex's sister
- George Custura
- Claudiu Istodor
- Mihai Niculescu
- Liviu Crăciun

== See also ==
- List of submissions to the 65th Academy Awards for Best Foreign Language Film
- List of Romanian submissions for the Academy Award for Best Foreign Language Film
