= Pepe & Fifi =

1994 film

- Directed by: Dan Pița
- Written by: Dan Pița
- Starring: Cristian Iacob; Irina Movila
- Release date: 1994
- Running time: 105 minutes
- Country: Romania
- Language: Romanian

Pepe & Fifi (Romanian: Pepe și Fifi) is a 1994 Romanian drama film directed by Dan Pița. The film was selected as the Romanian entry for the Best Foreign Language Film at the 67th Academy Awards, but was not accepted as a nominee.

== Cast ==
- Cristian Iacob as Pepe
- Irina Movila as Fifi

== See also ==
- List of submissions to the 67th Academy Awards for Best Foreign Language Film
- List of Romanian submissions for the Academy Award for Best Foreign Language Film
