= Weekend with My Mother =

Weekend with my Mother
- Directed by: Stere Gulea
- Starring: Medeea Marinescu; Adela Popescu
- Cinematography: Marius Panduru
- Music by: Jeremy Adelman
- Production company: MediaPro Pictures
- Release date: 20 March 2009
- Running time: 87 minutes
- Country: Romania
- Language: Romanian

Weekend with my Mother (Romanian: Weekend cu mama) is a 2009 Romanian drama film directed by Stere Gulea.

== Cast ==
- Medeea Marinescu - Luiza
- Adela Popescu - Cristina
- Tudor Istodor - Glont
- Ion Sapdaru - Sandu
- Constantin Ghenescu - Costica
- Gheorghe Dinică - Grandfather
- Andi Vasluianu - Johnny
- Ecaterina Nazare - Elena
- Nicoleta Costache Laura - Andreea
- Florin Zamfirescu - Felix
- Răzvan Vasilescu - Edwards

== Release ==
The film premiered in Romania in March 2009.

== Reception ==
Cineuropa described the film as a commercial failure.

The film was negatively reviewed in HotNews and positively reviewed in România liberă. The film has been discussed in academic literature in Translation Studies: Retrospective and Prospective Views, Studia Politica: Romanian Political Science Review, and Space and Culture.
