= The Last Ball in November =

Noiembrie, ultimul bal The Last Ball in November
- Directed by: Dan Pița
- Written by: Dan Pița
- Based on: Locul unde nu s-a întâmplat nimic by Mihail Sadoveanu
- Starring: Sergiu Tudose; Gioni Popovici; Ştefan Iordache
- Production company: Casa de Filme 4
- Distributed by: Audio Visual Romania (România)
- Release date: 1989
- Running time: 102 minutes
- Country: Romania
- Language: Romanian

The Last Ball in November (Romanian: Noiembrie, ultimul bal) is a 1989 Romanian film directed by Romanian director Dan Pița and based on a novel by Mihail Sadoveanu titled Locul unde nu s-a întâmplat nimic.

== Cast ==
- Sergiu Tudose
- Gioni Popovici
- Ștefan Iordache as Prince Lai Cantacuzin
- Valentin Popescu
- Cătălina Murgea
- Victoria Cociaș
- Cornel Scripcaru
- Gabriela Baciu
- Tomi Cristin
