= The Oil, the Baby and the Transylvanians =

Pruncul, petrolul și ardelenii The Oil, the Baby and the Transylvanians
- DVD cover
- Directed by: Dan Pița
- Written by: Francisc Munteanu
- Based on: an idea by Titus Popovici
- Starring: Mircea Diaconu; Ilarion Ciobanu; Ovidiu Iuliu Moldovan; Tania Filip
- Production company: Casa de Filme 3
- Distributed by: Româniafilm
- Release date: 1981
- Running time: 108 minutes
- Country: Romania
- Languages: Romanian; English

The Oil, the Baby and the Transylvanians (Romanian: Pruncul, petrolul și ardelenii, ) is a 1981 Romanian Red Western directed by Dan Pița.

It dramatises the struggles of Romanian and Hungarian settlers in a new land, the American frontier. Despite the American setting, including such minor details as use of the phrase "Bad-lands", it was shot entirely in Romania. A group of American Fulbright Scholars served as uncredited script consultants to make the English-language portion of the script sound more authentic.

It is a sequel to The Prophet, the Gold and the Transylvanians and The Actress, the Dollars and the Transylvanians, which are the first two parts of the trilogy.

== Plot ==
The Oil, the Baby and the Transylvanians is the third part of a fairly successful Romanian trilogy about three Transylvanian brothers, their families, and their companions in frontier America, on the Great Plains. Set in the 1880s, the drama, comedy, and perhaps appeal of the film comes from the characters' difficulty in adjusting to the American rhythm and lifestyle.

The youngest of the Brad brothers, Romulus, and his American fiancée, June, are expecting a baby. The wedding celebration is eagerly anticipated by all the family and organised according to ancient Romanian customs.

Meanwhile, the middle brother John, who is honest, courageous, and fast on the draw, is held in increasingly high esteem by the townsfolk as he faces down a series of bullies and hoodlums, which sets up several gunslinging showdown scenes. Eventually John is elected as sheriff. He hunts these "Wanted" criminals to subsidise Romulus' decaying ranch.

Traian, the eldest of the three brothers, goes looking for water for his cattle and passes through the land of the Orbans, who are ironically Hungarian-Transylvanian farmers. The Orbans and Brads forge an important alliance and friendship against outside danger and violence. However, instead of finding water on his land, Traian finds oil. But will the promise of riches corrupt the brothers and tempt them away from their new home?

== Crew ==
=== Main cast ===
- Mircea Diaconu as Romulus (Romi) Brad
- Ilarion Ciobanu as Traian Brad
- Ovidiu Iuliu Moldovan as Ion Brad a.k.a. Jonn Brad
- Tania Filip as June Brad, wife of Romi

=== Director ===
- Dan Pița
