= Josué Jéhouda =

Swiss Zionist writer and journalist

Josué Jéhouda (born Koldriansky; March 19, 1892 – March 19, 1966) was a Swiss Zionist writer and journalist.

Born in Russia, he fought in the Jewish Legion during World War I, and worked in the Zionist committee in Zürich up until the Balfour Declaration of 1917, founding the Revue juive magazine in Geneva.

He was author of the Histoire de la colonie juive de Genève 1843–1943 (1944), of the novel cycle La tragédie d'Israël (Miriam and De père en fils; 1927–1928), and of La Terre Promise (1926).

In the early 1910s, he boosted Panait Istrati's career by teaching him French and helping him during his illness.

In 1947, he was a delegate to the Seelisberg Conference.

He died on 19 March 1966 (the day of his 74th birthday) in Geneva.

== Selected works ==
- Le royaume de justice, Aux Éditions du Monde nouveau, 1923
- Éducation de l'inconscient. Étude sur l’hygiène de l’esprit, FeniXX réédition numérique, 1924
- La Terre Promise, F. Rieder, 1925
- De père en fils. Collection La Tragédie d'Israël, Bernard Grasset, 1927
- Miriam: la tragédie d'Israël, B. Grasset, 1928
- La Vocation d'Israël, La Baconnière, 1940
- Les cinq étapes du judaïsme émancipé, Éditions Synthésis, 1942
- L'histoire de la colonie juive de Genève (1843–1943), Éditions Synthesis, 1944
- Les grands problèmes de demain : le problème juif, Ed. Synthesis, 1945
- L'homme et l'oeuvre, Éditions du Centre, 1949
- La Science des aliments et la méthode Mono, Éditions Synthesis, 1952
- Sionisme et messianisme, Synthésis, 1954
- Guglielmo Ferrero, Éd. générales, 1954
- La leçon de l'histoire: Israël et la Chrétienté, Éditions Synthesis, 1956
- L'antisémitisme, miroir du monde, Éditions Synthésis, 1958
- Le marxisme face au monothéisme et au christianisme, La Baconnière, 1962
- Témoignage et confrontations en vue de surmonter la crise du monde actuel par le renouvellement du sens du monothéisme, Éditions Synthesis, 1962
- The Five Stages of Jewish Emancipation, T. Yoseloff, 1966
