= Petre Nicolae =

Romanian actor

Petre Nicolae (Romanian pronunciation: [ˈpetre nikoˈla.e]) is a Romanian actor. He appeared in over 20 films, and starred in Pas în doi (1985).
