= Panait Istrati =

Romanian writer (1884–1935)

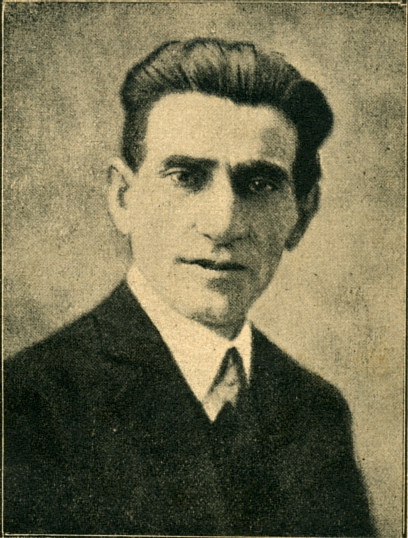
Panait Istrati (1927)

Panait Istrati (Romanian: [panaˈit isˈtratʲ]; sometimes rendered as Panaït Istrati; (August 10, 1884 – April 16, 1935) was a Romanian working class writer, who wrote in French and Romanian, nicknamed The Maxim Gorky of the Balkans. Istrati appears to be the first Romanian author explicitly depicting a homosexual character in his work.

Although he lived and worked mainly in Romania, due to his impact on French literature, Istrati is sometimes also labeled as "French writer".

== Early life ==
Born in Brăila, Istrati was the son of the laundress Joița Istrate and of the Greek tobacco trader Georgios Valsamis from the village of Faraklata in Kefalonia.

He studied in primary school for six years in Baldovinești, after being held back twice. He then earned his living as an apprentice to a tavern-keeper, then as a pastry cook and peddler. In the meantime, he was a prolific reader.

His first attempts at writing date from around 1907 when he started sending pieces to the socialist periodicals in Romania, debuting with the article, Hotel Regina in România Muncitoare. Here, he later published his first short stories, Mântuitorul ("The Redeemer"), Calul lui Bălan ("Bălan's Horse"), Familia noastră ("Our Family"), 1 Mai ("May Day"). He also contributed pieces to other leftist newspapers such as Dimineața, Adevărul, and Viața Socială.

In 1910, he was involved in organizing a strike action in Brăila. He went to Bucharest, Istanbul, Cairo, Naples, Paris (1913–1914), and Switzerland (where he settled for a while, trying to cure his tuberculosis). Istrati's travels were marked by two successive unhappy marriages, a brief return to Romania in 1915 when he tried to earn his living as a hog farmer, and long periods of vagabondage.

While in the sanatorium, Istrati met Russian Jewish-Swiss Zionist writer Josué Jéhouda, who became his friend and French language tutor.

Living in misery, ill and depressed, he attempted suicide in 1921 on his way to Nice, but his life was rescued in time. Shortly before the attempt, he had written to Romain Rolland, the French writer he admired most and with whom he had long tried to get in touch. Rolland received the letter through the Police and immediately replied. In 1923 Istrati's story Kyra Kyralina (or Chira Chiralina) was published with a preface by Rolland. It became the first in his Adrien Zograffi literary cycle. Rolland was fascinated with Istrati's adventurous life, urging him to write more and publishing parts of his work in Clarté, the magazine that he and Henri Barbusse owned. The next major work by Istrati was the novel Codine.

== Istrati and communism ==
Istrati shared the leftist ideals of Rolland, and, as much as his mentor, placed his hopes in the Bolshevik vision. In 1927 he visited the Soviet Union on the anniversary of the October Revolution, accompanied by Christian Rakovsky during the first stage of the journey (Rakovsky was Soviet ambassador to Paris, and by then already falling out of favor with Joseph Stalin). He travelled through large sections of the European part, witnessing celebrations in Moscow and Kiev. He was joined in Moscow by his future close friend, Nikos Kazantzakis; while in the city, Panait Istrati met Victor Serge and expressed his wish to become a citizen of the Soviet Union. He and Kazantzakis wrote Stalin a congratulatory letter that remained unanswered.

In 1928–29, after a tumultuous stay in Greece (where he was engaged in fights with the police and invited to leave the country), he went again to the Soviet Union. Through extended visits in more remote places such as the Moldavian ASSR (where he got in touch with his friend Ecaterina Arbore), Nizhny Novgorod, Baku, and Batumi, Istrati learned the full truth of Stalin's communist dictatorship, out of which experience he wrote his famous book, The Confession of a Loser, the first in the succession of disenchantments expressed by intellectuals such as Arthur Koestler and André Gide. Istrati dealt with the mounting persecution of Old Bolsheviks and the gradual victimization of whole population groups. His views were also harshly made clear in two letters he sent to the GPU leadership in December 1928.

Thereafter, he suffered a crisis of conscience mainly due to being branded a "Trotskyist" or even a "Fascist" by his former communist friends, the most violent of which proved to be Henri Barbusse. Rolland had praised Istrati's letters to the GPU, but he nonetheless chose to stay clear of the controversy. Istrati came back to Romania ill and demoralised, was treated for tuberculosis in Nice, then returned to Bucharest.

== Last years ==
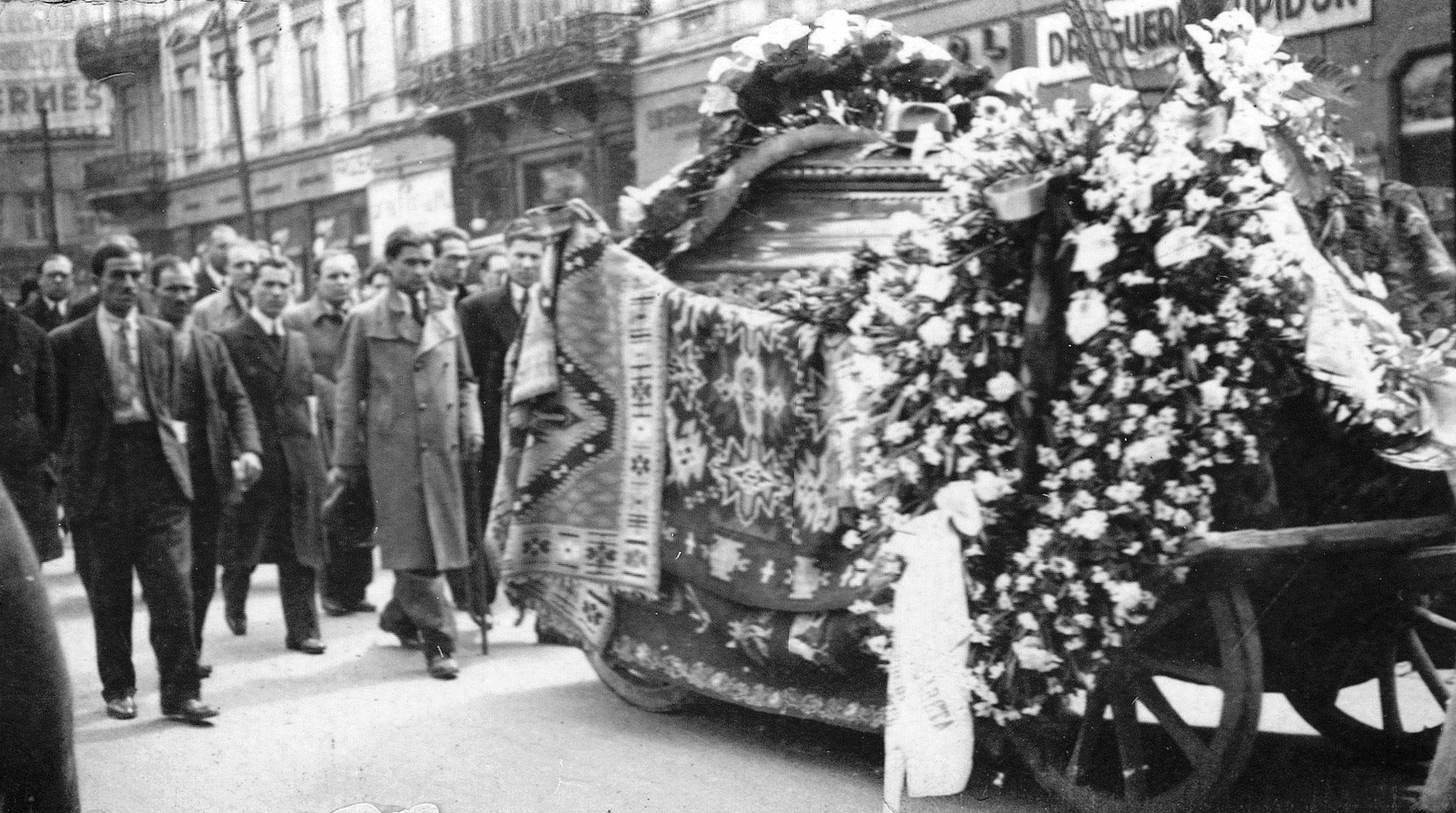
Funeral of Panait Istrati in April 1935

The political opinions Istrati expressed after his split with Bolshevism are rather ambiguous. He was still closely watched by the Romanian secret police (Siguranța Statului), and he had written an article (dated April 8, 1933) in the French magazine Les Nouvelles littéraires, aptly titled L'homme qui n'adhère à rien ("The man who will adhere to nothing").

At the same time, Istrati started publishing in Cruciada Românismului ("The Crusade of Romanianism"), the voice of a left-leaning splinter group of the ultra-nationalist Iron Guard. As such, Istrati became associated with the group's leader Mihai Stelescu, who had been elected as a member of Parliament for the Iron Guard in 1933 and whose dissidence was the reason for his brutal assassination by the Decemviri in 1936; Istrati was himself assaulted several times by the Guard's squads.

Isolated and unprotected, Panait Istrati died at Filaret Sanatorium in Bucharest. He was buried in Bellu Cemetery.

== List of works ==
=== Adrian Zografi series ===
- Les Récits d'Adrien Zograffi / The Stories of Adrian Zografi
- Kyra Kyralina, Rieder, Paris, 1924, preface: Romain Rolland; Romanian translation by IG Hertz, Bucharest, 1934
- Oncle Anghel, Rieder, Paris, 1924; Romanian translation by the author: Renaşterea, Bucharest, 1925
- Les Haidoucs : I. Présentation de Haidoucs, Rieder, Paris, 1925
- Les Haidoucs : II. Domnitza de Snagov, Rieder, Paris, 1926
- Enfance d'Adrien Zograffi / Childhood of Adrian Zografi
- Codine, Rieder, Paris, 1926; Romanian translation by IG Hertz, Bucharest, 1935
- Adolescence d'Adrien Zograffi / Adolescence of Adrian Zografi
- Mikhail, Rieder, Paris, 1927
- Vie d'Adrien Zograffi / The Life of Adrian Zografi
- At Maison Thuringer, Rieder, Paris, 1933; Romanian version by the author: Cartea Românească, Bucharest, 1933
- Le Bureau du Placement, Rieder, Paris, 1933; Romanian version by the author: Cartea Românească, Bucharest, 1933
- Méditerranée. Lever du soleil, Rieder, Paris, 1934
- Méditerranée. Coucher du soleil, Rieder, Paris, 1935; Romanian translation by the author: Cartea Românească, Bucharest, 1936

=== Outside the "Adrian Zografi" cycle ===
- Past and future. Autobiographical pages, Renaissance, Bucharest, 1925
- La Famille Perlmutter, Gallimard, Paris, 1927 (in collaboration with Josué Jéhouda)
- Isaac, the joust of the iron, Joseph Hessler librairie, Strasbourg, 1927
- Le Refrain de la fosse (Nerantsoula), Grasset, Paris, 1927
- Mes départs (pages autobiographiques), Gallimard, Paris, 1928; Romanian translation by the author (posthumous): Cartea Românească, Bucharest, 1940
- Les Chardons du Baragan, Bernard Grasset, Paris, 1928; Romanian translation by the author, only the first chapter (posthumous): Moderna, Bucharest, 1943
- Confession pour vaincus. Après seize mois dans l'URSS, Rieder, Paris, 1929
- Le Pécheur d'éponges (pages autobiographiques), Rieder, Paris, 1930; Romanian translation by the author (posthumous): Dacia, Bucharest
- Pour avoir aimé la terre, Denoël et Steele, Paris, 1930
- Tsatsa Minnka, Rieder, Paris, 1931; Romanian version by Eminescu, Bucharest, 1931
- En Égypte, Éditions des Cahiers libres, Paris, 1931

=== Editions ===
- Selected Works / Œuvres choisies, Romanian-French bilingual edition, elected texts, preface and notes by Al. Oprea, translation by Eugen Barbu, vols. 1–9, Bucharest, Publishing House for Literature / Minerva Publishing House, 1966–1984
- Works, bilingual French-Romanian, Edited, foreword and notes by Zamfir Balan Publisher Istros Museum Brăila (Kyra Kyralina / rent Chiralina 1993, second edition, 2009; Oncle Anghel / Moș
- Anghel, 1995 Codina / Codin, 1996; Tsatsa Minnka / Țața Minca, 1997; La Maison Thuringer / Casa Thuringer, 1998).
- Works. Stories. Roman, Edited, chronology, notes and comments by Teodor Vârgolici introduction of Eugen Simion, vols. 1–2 Bucharest: Univers encyclopedic collection "fundamental works" 2003

This list and many of Istrati's works are on Wikisource.

== English translations of works ==
=== Adrien Zograffi's Accounts ===
- Kyra Kyralina (or Chira Chiralina; also translated under the title Kyra My Sister)
- Uncle Anghel
- The Haiduks (or The Bandits):
  - Presentation of the Haiduks (or Presentation of the Bandits)
  - Domnitza de Snagov

=== Adrien Zograffi's Childhood ===
- Codine (or Codin, Kodin)
- Michael (or Mikhaïl)
- Mes Départs
- The Sponge-Fisher

=== Adrien Zograffi's Life ===
- The Thüringer House
- Le Bureau de Placement
- Mediterranean (Sunrise)
- Mediterranean (Sunset)

=== Other works ===
- Kyr Nicolas
- The Perlmutter Family
- Nerantula (or Neranțula, Nerantsoula, Nerrantsoula)
- The Thistles of the Bărăgan (or Ciulinii Bărăganului)
- To the Other Flame and The Confession of a Loser (published also as Russia unveiled: 1927–1930)
- Tsatsa-Minnka

== Filmography ==
While in the Soviet Union, Istrati wrote a screenplay based on his own work entitled, The Bandits, a project that was never completed.

Kira Kiralina was filmed in 1927 as a silent film in Soviet Ukraine, produced by VUFKU. The novel was filmed for a second time in 1993, as a Romanian-Hungarian production directed by Gyula Maár. A third production, the Dan Pița-directed Kira Kiralina, appeared in 2014. There is also a 1958 Franco–Romanian film, Ciulinii Bărăganului, and Codine (Codin), a Franco–Romanian co-production of 1962.

== Critical works on Istrati ==
- Roger Dadoun, Panait Istrati, L'Arc, Aix-en-Provence, 1983.
- Elisabeth Geblesco, Panaït Istrati et la métaphore paternelle, Anthropos, Paris, 1989, ISBN 2-7178-1665-8
- Mircea Iorgulescu, Panaït Istrati, Oxus Éditions, collection Les Roumains de Paris, Paris, 2004, ISBN 2-84898-037-0
- Monique Jutrin-Klener, Panaït Istrati: un chardon déraciné: écrivain français, conteur roumain, Éditeur F. Maspero, Paris, 1970
- Monique Jutrin-Klener, Hélène Lenz, Daniel Lérault, Martha Popovici, Élisabeth Geblesco, Catherine Rossi, Jeanne-Marie Santraud, Les haïdoucs dans l'œuvre de Panaït Istrati : l'insoumission des vaincus, L'Harmattan, collection Critiques Littéraires, Paris, 2002, ISBN 2-7475-3199-6
- Édouard Raydon, Panaït Istrati, vagabond de génie, Les Éditions Municipales, Paris, 1968
- David Seidmann, L'existence juive dans l'œuvre de Panaït Istrati, Éditions Nizet, Paris, 1984, ISBN 2-7078-1040-1
- Jean-François Bacot, "Panaït Istrati ou la conscience écorchée d'un vaincu" in Moebius: Écritures/Littérature, Numéro 35, hiver 1988, p. 95-114, éditions Triptyque (Montréal).
