= Oxygen Starvation (film) =

1992 drama film

- Directed by: Andrey Donchyk
- Screenplay by: Yuri Andrukhovych; Andrey Donchyk
- Produced by: Marko Steph; Andriy Donchyk
- Starring: Taras Denyssenko
- Cinematography: Ihor Krupnov
- Edited by: Veronika Arefyeva
- Music by: Yuriy Saenko
- Release date: 1992
- Language: Russian

Oxygen Starvation (Ukrainian: Кисневий голод, romanized: Kisneviy golod) is a 1992 drama film directed by Andriy Donchyk, in his feature film debut. A co-production between Canada and Ukraine, it was screened at the 49th edition of the Venice Film Festival.

== Cast ==
- Taras Denyssenko as Andriy Bilyk
- Oleg Maslennikov as Sergeant Koshachi
- Viktor Stepanov as Praporshchik Gamalia
- Oleksiy Gorbunov as Captain Golykov
- Alexandr Mironov as Junior Sergeant Boyko
- Mukhammadzhan Rakhimov as Saidov

== Production ==
The film was produced by Kobza International, with Ukrainian companies Kobza Joint Venture and Victory FF serving as co-producers. Among the earliest privately financed films in independent Ukraine, it is inspired by the real-life experiences of director Andrii Donchyk and screenwriter Yurii Andrukhovych. It was shot in 1991 at real military sites, including the ruins of nuclear missile launchers and previously secret military zones.

== Release ==
Oxygen Starvation entered the competition at the Venice International Film Critics' Week sidebar of the 49th Venice International Film Festival. It was also screened at the 17th Toronto Film Festival and at the 33rd Thessaloniki Film Festival, in which Taras Denyssenko received the award for best actor.

== Reception ==
Variety's critic David Stratton called the film a "From Here to Eternity Ukrainian-style", and described it as "tolerable" thanks to its "forceful direction and impressive thesping", but ultimately offering "little other than a catalogue of brutality and degradation".
