= The Old Man and the Bureaucrats =

1967 novella by Mircea Eliade

- First edition
- Author: Mircea Eliade
- Original title: Pe strada Mântuleasa
- Translator: Mary Park Stevenson
- Language: Romanian
- Publication date: 1967
- English publication date: 1979
- Pages: 127

The Old Man and the Bureaucrats (Romanian: Pe strada Mântuleasa) is a 1967 novella by the Romanian writer Mircea Eliade. It tells the story of a man who is interrogated by Romania's communist authorities, and puzzles the interrogators when he tells stories of local lore. The book was published in English in 1979. Together with two other stories by Eliade it forms the basis for the 1996 film Eu sunt Adam.

== Themes ==
Mircea Eliade wrote about his aim with the novella: "I wanted to engineer a confrontation between two mythologies: the mythology of folklore, of the people, which is still alive, still welling up in the old man, and the mythology of the modern world, of technocracy. ... These two mythologies meet head on. The police try to discover the hidden meaning of all these stories. ... But they are also blinkered, they can only look for political secrets. ... They are incapable of imagining that there can be meaning outside the political field."

== Bibliography ==
- Bogdan, Andrei (2000). "Ambiguitate şi semnificaţie în "Pe strada Mântuleasa" ("Ambiguity and Significance in "On Mântuleasa Street"")". Revista Literară Vatra (in Romanian) (6–7): 13–16. ISSN 1220-6334.
