= Pas în doi =

- Directed by: Dan Pița
- Written by: Dan Piţa
- Produced by: Vily Auerbach
- Starring: Claudiu Bleont
- Cinematography: Marian Stanciu
- Edited by: Cristina Ionescu
- Release date: 1985
- Country: Romania
- Language: Romanian

Pas în doi, also known as Paso Doble, is a 1985 Romanian film directed by Dan Pița. It stars Claudiu Bleonț, Petre Nicolae, Anda Onesa and Ecaterina Nazare. It was entered into the 36th Berlin International Film Festival where it won an Honourable Mention.

== Synopsis ==
The film tells the story of a man who falls in love with two very different women.

== Cast ==
- Claudiu Bleonț as Mihai
- Petre Nicolae as Ghiță
- Ecaterina Nazare as Maria
- Anda Onesa as Monica
- Mircea Andreescu as Meșterul Anton
- Valentin Popescu as Iulian
- Aurora Leonte as Felicia
- Adrian Titieni as Dodo
- Tudorel Filimon as Bob
- Camelia Maxim as Nineta
- Cornel Revent as Pricop
- Lucreția Maier as Eleonora
- Virgil Andriescu as Virgil
- Christian Maurer as Directorul
- Mircea Constantinescu
- Romeo Pop
- Miruna Birău
- Claudiu Istodor
- Iulia Boroș
- Manuela Ciucur
- Ruxandra Bucescu
