= Valea Ursului =

- Commune
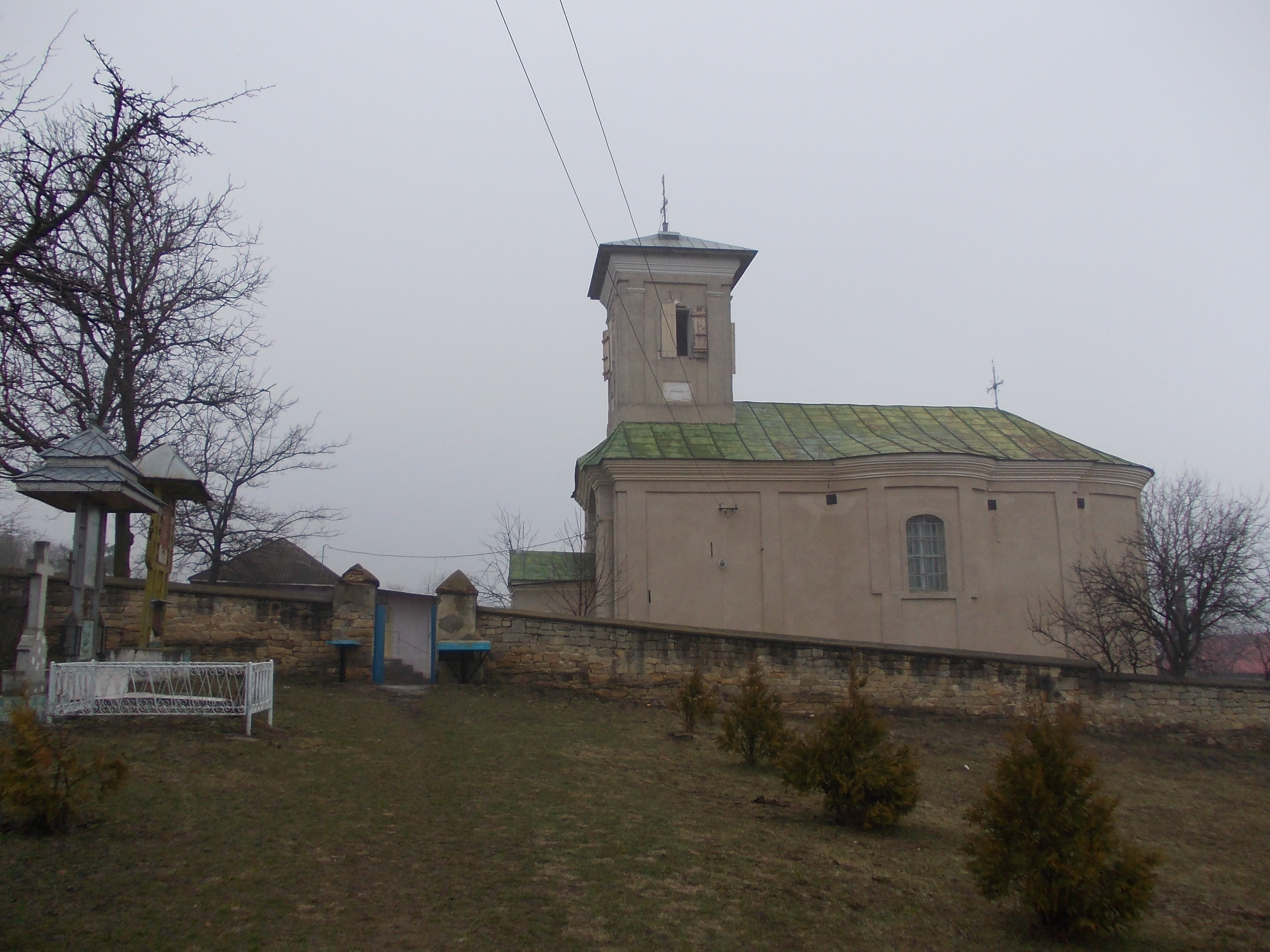
- Saint Demeter Church, Valea Ursului

- Location in Neamț County

- Location in Romania
- Coordinates: 46°48′N 27°4′E
- Country: Romania
- County: Neamț

Government
  - Mayor (2024–2028): Viorel Smeria (PSD)
- Area: 59.64 km^{2} (23.03 sq mi)
- Elevation: 272 m (892 ft)
- Population (2021-12-01): 3,436
  - Density: 57.61/km^{2} (149.2/sq mi)
- Time zone: UTC+02:00 (EET)
  - Summer (DST): UTC+03:00 (EEST)
- Postal code: 617495
- Area code: +40 233
- Vehicle reg.: NT
- Website: www.valeaursului.ro

Valea Ursului is a commune in Neamț County, Western Moldavia, Romania. It is composed of five villages: Bucium, Chilii, Giurgeni, Muncelu de Jos, and Valea Ursului.

The commune lies on the Central Moldavian Plateau, on the banks of the Bârlad River, which has its source here. It is located in the southeastern extremity of Neamț County, on the border with Bacău County, 26 km (16 mi) from Roman and 43 km (27 mi) from Bacău; the county seat, Piatra Neamț, is 70 km (43 mi) away.

Historical population
Year	Pop.	±%
1992	4,822	—
2002	3,954	−18.0%
2011	3,874	−2.0%
2021	3,436	−11.3%
Source: Census data

== Natives ==
- Ecaterina Nazare (born 1953), actress
