= Kira Kiralina =

- Poster
- Directed by: Dan Pița
- Screenplay by: Ioan Grigorescu
- Story by: Panait Istrati
- Produced by: Vlad Păunescu
- Starring: Florin Zamfirescu; Iulia Dumitru; Ștefan Iancu; Corneliu Ulici; Iulia Cirstea
- Production company: Castel Film Studio
- Release date: 4 September 2014
- Running time: 99 minutes
- Country: Romania
- Language: Romanian

Kira Kiralina (or Kyra Kyralina) is a 2014 Romanian film directed by Dan Pița. It is based on the novel by the same name published by Panait Istrati in 1924.

== Cast ==
- Florin Zamfirescu as Ilie
- Ovidiu Niculescu as Sima
- Constantin Florescu as Cosma
- Mircea Rusu as Rotarul
- Andrei Runcanu as Leonard
- Ștefan Iancu as Dragomir (age 15)
- Maria Teslaru as Veturia
- Corneliu Ulici as Dragomir (age 35)
- Iulia Dumitru as Chira
- Iulian Glita as Mogâldeață
- Silviu Debu as Vasile
- József Bíró as Nazim
- Mihai Raducu as Ibrahim
- Iulia Cirstea as Chiralina
- Iuliana Nedelea as Fana
- Dana Borteanu as Mrs. Pavlik
