= 49th Venice International Film Festival =

Italian film festival in 1992

- Location: Venice, Italy
- Founded: 1932
- Awards: Golden Lion: The Story of Qiu Ju
- Festival date: 1 – 12 September 1992
- Website: Website

Venice Film Festival chronology
- 50th 48th

The 49th annual Venice International Film Festival was held on 1 to 12 September 1992. American actor and filmmaker Dennis Hopper and Czech filmmaker Jiří Menzel were the Jury Co-Presidents of the Main Competition.

The Golden Lion winner was The Story of Qiu Ju by Zhang Yimou.

== Jury ==
=== Main Competition ===
The following people comprised the 1992 jury:

- Dennis Hopper, American actor and filmmaker - Jury Co-President
- Jirí Menzel, Czechoslovak filmmaker - Jury Co-President
- Gianni Amelio, Italian filmmaker
- Anne Brochet, French actress
- Neil Jordan, Irish filmmaker and writer
- Hanif Kureishi, English writer
- Ennio Morricone, Italian composer and conductor
- Michael Ritchie, American filmmaker and producer
- Jacques Siclier, French film historian and critic
- Fernando Solanas, Argentine filmmaker and politician
- Sheila Whitaker, English writer

== Official Sections ==
=== Main Competition ===
The following films were selected for the main competition for the Golden Lion:

English title	Original title	Director(s)	Production country
The Absence	Die Abwesenheit	Peter Handke	Germany
Acla's Descent into Floristella	La discesa di Aclà a Floristella	Aurelio Grimaldi	Italy
Brothers and Sisters	Fratelli e sorelle	Pupi Avati	Italy
Chasing Butterflies	La Chasse aux papillons	Otar Iosseliani	France
Death of a Neapolitan Mathematician	Morte di un matematico napoletano	Mario Martone	Italy
Glengarry Glen Ross		James Foley	United States
Guelwaar		Ousmane Sembène	Senegal, France
Ham Ham	Jamón Jamón	Bigas Luna	Spain
A Heart in Winter	Un cœur en hiver	Claude Sautet	France
In the Soup		Alexandre Rockwell	United States
L.627		Bertrand Tavernier	France
The Last Dive	O Último Mergulho	João César Monteiro	Portugal
Luxury Hotel	Hotel de Lux	Dan Pița	Romania
Olivier, Olivier		Agnieszka Holland	France
Orlando		Sally Potter	United Kingdom
The Plague	La Peste	Luis Puenzo	Argentina
Raising Cain		Brian De Palma	United States
The Sentimental Policeman	Чувствительный милиционер	Kira Muratova	Ukraine, France
The Story of Qiu Ju	秋菊打官司	Zhang Yimou	China
The Waltz on the Petschora	ვალსი პეჩორაზე	Lana Gogoberidze	Georgia
The Well	Kaivo	Pekka Lehto	Finland

=== Out of competition ===
English title	Original title	Director(s)	Production country
Flight of the Innocent	La corsa dell'innocente	Carlo Carlei	Italy
Heimat 2	Die zweite Heimat	Edgar Reitz	Germany

=== Venetian Nights ===
English title	Original title	Director(s)	Production country
The Crying Game		Neil Jordan	Ireland
Daens		Stijn Coninx	Belgium
A Midnight Clear		Keith Gordon	United States
Minbo	ミンボーの女	Jūzō Itami	Japan
Moscow Parade	Прорва	Ivan Dykhovichnyj	Russia
Non chiamarmi Omar		Sergio Staino	Italy
Patriot Games		Phillip Noyce	United States
The Playboys		Gillies MacKinnon	United Kingdom
The Public Eye		Howard Franklin	United States
The Stolen Diary	Le cahier volé	Christine Lipinska	France

=== Window on Images ===
English title	Original title	Director(s)	Production country
About Love, Tokyo	愛について、東京	Mitsuo Yanagimachi	Japan
Antonia and Jane		Beeban Kidron	United Kingdom
Heaven Rises	El cielo sube	Marc Recha	Spain
Painted Skin	畫皮之陰陽法王	King Hu	China
Incident at Oglala		Michael Apted	United States
The Southern Cross	La cruz del sur	Patricio Guzmán	Spain
Monster in a Box		Nick Broomfield	United Kingdom
On the Bridge		Frank Perry	United States
Roncsfilm		György Szomjas	Hungary
Tango Argentino		Goran Paskaljević	Yugoslavia

=== Italian Film Panorama ===
English title	Original title	Director(s)
Un'altra vita		Carlo Mazzacurati
Donne sottotetto		Roberto Giannarelli
Going South	Verso Sud	Pasquale Pozzessere
Manila Paloma Blanca		Daniele Segre
Nero		Giancarlo Soldi
Quattro figli unici		Fulvio Wetzl
Trittico di Antonello		Francesco Crescimone
We Wanted to Be U2	Volevamo essere gli U2	Andrea Barzini
Who Wants to Kill Sara?	Tutti gli uomini di Sara	Gianpaolo Tescari

== Independent Sections ==
=== Venice International Film Critics' Week ===
The following feature films were selected to be screened for this section:

English title	Original title	Director(s)	Production country
Galaxies Are Colliding		John Ryman	United States
Klamek ji bo Beko		Nizamettin Ariç	Germany, Turkey
Leon the Pig Farmer		Gary Sinyor, Vadim Jean	United Kingdom
Less Dead Than the Others	Minder dood dan de Anderen	Frans Buyens	Belgium
Naprawde krotki film o milosci, zabijaniu i jeszcze jednym przykazaniu		Rafal Wieczynsky	Poland
Oxygen Starvation	Kisneviy golod	Andrey Donchik	Canada, Ukraine
Sabine		Philippe Faucon	France
The Seven Deadly Sins	Les sept péchés capitaux	Beatriz Flores Silva, Frédéric Fonteyne, Yvan Le Moine, Geneviève Mersch, Pier-Paul Renders, Pasca Zabus, Philippe Blasbard, Olivier Smolders	France, Belgium, Luxemburg
Special screenings
Amblin' (1968)		Steven Spielberg	United States
Sunday's Children	Söndagsbarn	Daniel Bergman	Sweden
The Valley of Stone	La valle di pietra - Kalkstein	Maurizio Zaccaro	Italy

== Official Awards ==
=== Main Competition ===
- Golden Lion: The Story of Qiu Ju by Yimou Zhang
- Grand Special Jury Prize: Death of a Neapolitan Mathematician by Mario Martone
- Silver Lion:
  - A Heart in Winter by Claude Sautet
  - Jamón jamón by Bigas Luna
  - Luxury Hotel by Dan Pita
- Volpi Cup for Best Actor: Jack Lemmon for Glengarry Glen Ross
- Volpi Cup for Best Actress: Gong Li for The Story of Qiu Ju

=== Career Golden Lion ===
- Francis Ford Coppola
- Jeanne Moreau
- Paolo Villaggio

== Independent Awards ==
=== The President of the Italian Senate's gold medal ===
- Guelwaar by Ousmane Sembene

=== Audience Award ===
- Tango Argentino by Goran Paskaljević

=== FIPRESCI Prize ===
- Un coeur en hiver by Claude Sautet
- Leon the Pig Farmer by Vadim Jean
- Die zweite Heimat - Chronik einer Jugend by Edgar Reitz

=== OCIC Award ===
- Orlando by Sally Potter
  - Honorable Mention:
    - Daens by Stijn Coninx
    - The Story of Qiu Ju by Li Gong

=== Pietro Bianchi Award ===
- Marco Ferreri

=== Elvira Notari Prize ===
- Orlando by Sally Potter

=== Special Prize on Occasion of the Festival's Jubilee ===
- Die zweite Heimat - Chronik einer Jugend by Edgar Reitz
