= Ecaterina Nazare =

Romanian actress

- Born: March 27, 1953 (age 73); Valea Ursului, Neamț County, Romanian People's Republic
- Occupation: Actress
- Years active: 1983 – present

Ecaterina Nazare (born March 27, 1953) is a Romanian actress. She was the winner of the ACIN Best Actress award for her cinematic performances in 1983 and 1985, and is noted in particular for her portrayal of Maria in the Dan Pița film, Pas în doi. During the 1990s and early 2000s, Nazare was employed by the National Theatre in Bucharest.

== Career ==
=== Early stage and film work ===
A native of Valea Ursului, Neamț County, Nazare began as a stage actress in the early 1980s, when she became employed at the Toma Caragiu Theatre in Ploiești (1981). During the same decade, she appeared in plays such as Paul Everac's Don Juan, Ion Luca Caragiale's D-ale carnavalului and Dumitru Radu Popescu's Acești îngeri triști, all under theatre director Dragoș Galgoțiu.

She made her Romanian film industry debut in 1983 in the film Lisca in which she played the title character Lisca which won her her first ACIN Best Actress Award. Then, in 1985, she starred as Maria in the Dan Pița film, Pas în doi. Her performance once again garnered her the ACIN Award for Best Actress. In 1986 she had a prolific year, appearing in The Shadows of the Sun (Umbrele soarelui), O clipă de ragaz and Battle in the Shadows (Bătălia din umbră).

In 1988, Nazare starred as "Mama" in the film Cîntec in zori. Directed by Dinu Tănase, she starred alongside actors such as Dan Condurache, Ion Fiscuteanu, Remus Mărgineanu, Ionel Mihăilescu, Irina Petrescu, Mitică Popescu, etc. She followed this in 1990 with the film Sanda.

=== National Theatre stage acting ===
The National Theatre Bucharest, where Nazare performed during much of the 1990s and early 2000s

In 1990, after the Romanian Revolution toppled the communist regime, she left the film industry and the theatre she had been performing at in Ploiești amongst her cinematic appearances and concentrated on national stage acting at the main National Theatre in Bucharest. She would appear in many national productions throughout the 1990s. In 1990 she made a number of stage performances under the directorship of Andrei Șerban, including as Liz Morden in Cine are nevoie de teatru? (after Timberlake Wertenbaker), Andromache in Șerban's Troienele - O tragedie greacă and Audiția, based on Michael Bennett. In 1991 she played Varvara in the play Morișca by Ion Luca under the directorship of George Motoi and later amongst other roles, Orseta in Carlo Goldoni's Le baruffe chiozzotte (Gâlcevile din Chioggia) under the supervision of Dana Dima. In the early 1990s she also appeared in a show based on Shakespeare's sonnets and in Orpheus in the Underworld, both led by Mihai Manolescu.

In 1994 she appeared in Federico García Lorca's play The House of Bernarda Alba and in 1995, in Der Park (Parcul) by Botho Strauß, under the helm of Tudor Țepeneag. She would later again be directed by Țepeneag in 2004's production, Povestiri din zona interzisă. Later in 2004 she played the character of Beatrice in Arthur Miller's A View from the Bridge, directed by Vladimir Ilnițchi, and in 2008 portrayed Mihaela in Rodica Popescu Bitănescu's Încă-i bine.

=== Return to cinema ===
She returned to cinema briefly in 2002 in the film Bless You, Prison (Binecuvântata fii, închisoare) in which she played a prisoner. She has since starred as Elena in the 2009 film Weekend with my Mother. The film, directed by Stere Gulea, was released on March 20, 2009 and co-starred actors such as Medeea Marinescu, Adela Popescu, Tudor Istodor, Ion Sapdaru, Constantin Ghenescu, and Gheorghe Dinică.
