= Constantin Sandu-Aldea =

Romanian agronomist and writer (1874–1927)

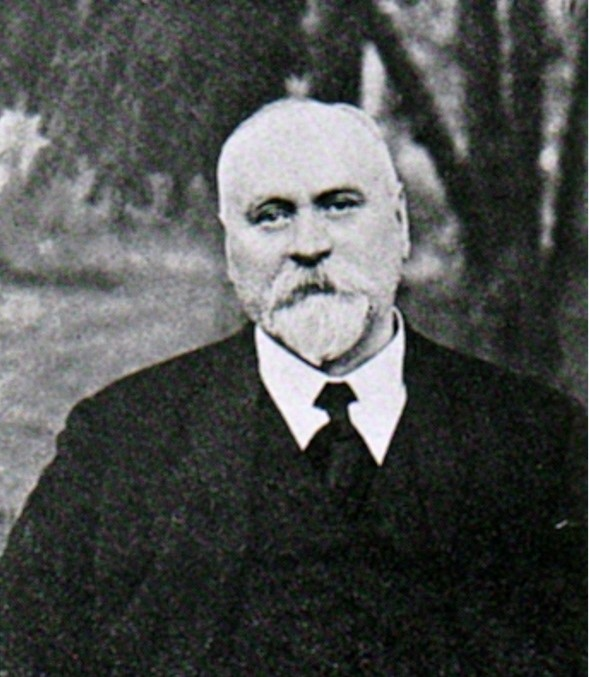
Constantin Sandu-Aldea

Constantin Sandu-Aldea (November 22, 1874 – March 21, 1927) was a Romanian agronomist and prose writer.

Born in Tichilești, Brăila County, his parents were the cart driver Sandu Petrea Pârjol and his wife Tudora. After completing studies at Nicolae Bălcescu High School in Brăila, he attended the Bucharest-based Herăstrău Agriculture School between 1892 and 1896, graduating as an agronomist. He did not find a job in the field, but instead worked as an estate administrator at Crivina, Prahova County; a fisheries agent; a Căile Ferate Române clerk and an editor and proofreader for Floare-albastră, Epoca, România jună and Apărarea națională magazines. Between 1901 and 1907, he took advanced courses at the École nationale supérieure d'horticulture in Versailles; he studied at the Agricultural University of Berlin from 1904 and earned a doctorate in 1906. Sandu-Aldea worked as a teaching assistant for applied agriculture and zootechnics at the model farm in Laza, Vaslui County; served as bureau chief in the Agriculture and Domains Ministry; and, from 1908, was professor and director of the Herăstrău school. He was elected a corresponding member of the Romanian Academy in 1919.

Sandu-Aldea made his literary debut with poems in Vieața (1896), also writing for Lumea nouă literară și științifică, Familia, Floare-albastră, Curierul literar, Sămănătorul, Convorbiri Literare, Luceafărul and Viața Românească, and using the pen names S. Voinea, C. Răsvan, S. Dancu, Cheptea, Stan Pârjol and Miron Aldea. He wrote a number of valued scientific texts about wheat; his prose fiction deals especially with rural subjects and attempts to reveal the depth and diversity of the peasant soul. Representative works include Drum și popas (1904), În urma plugului (1905) and Pe drumul Bărăganului (1908), collections of tales and short stories; and the novels Două neamuri (1906) and Pe Mărgineanca (1912), which feature bitter conflicts between social classes, resolved in Sămănătorist fashion. He translated works by Henrik Ibsen, Hermann Sudermann, Pierre Loti and Leonid Andreyev.
