= Tichilești =

- Commune
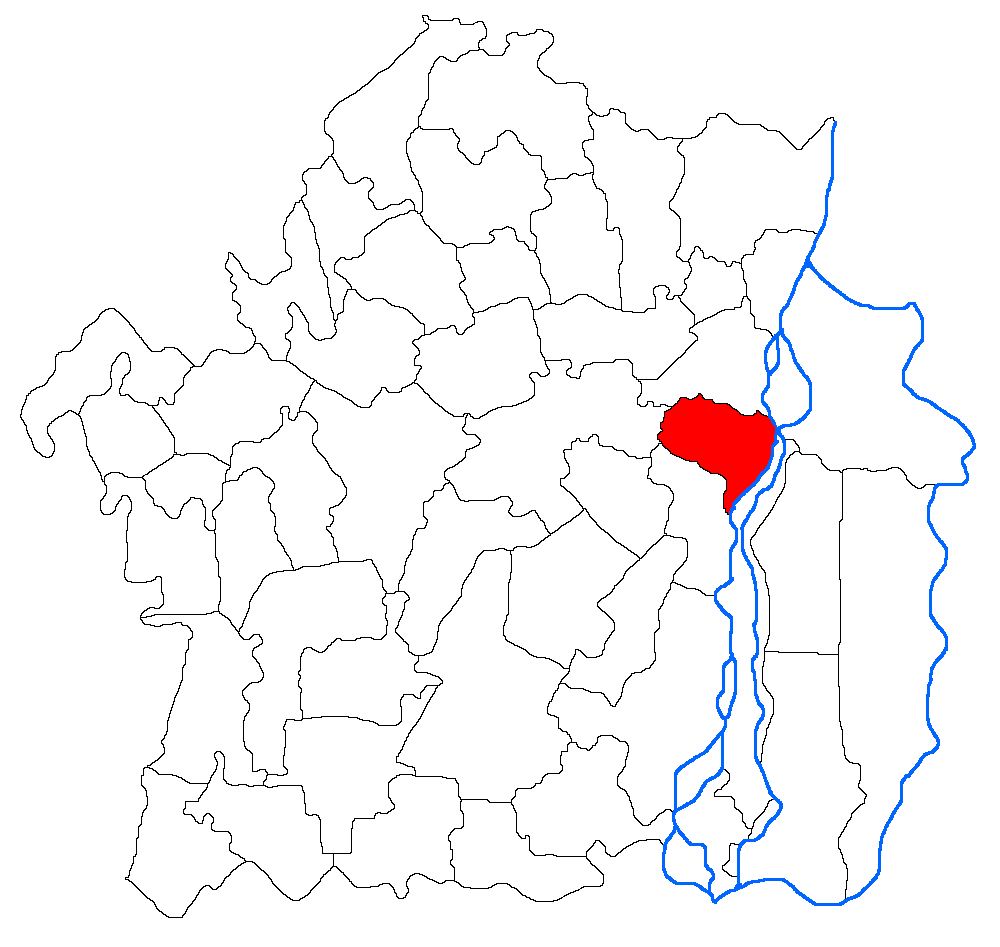
- Location in Brăila County

- Location in Romania
- Coordinates: 45°08′39″N 27°53′51″E
- Country: Romania
- County: Brăila

Government
  - Mayor (2024–2028): Gicu Davidescu (PNL)
- Area: 63.48 km^{2} (24.51 sq mi)
- Elevation: 14 m (46 ft)
- Population (2021-12-01): 3,419
  - Density: 53.86/km^{2} (139.5/sq mi)
- Time zone: UTC+02:00 (EET)
  - Summer (DST): UTC+03:00 (EEST)
- Postal code: 817170
- Area code: +(40) 239
- Vehicle reg.: BR
- Website: www.primariatichilesti.ro

Tichilești is a commune located in Brăila County, Muntenia, Romania. It is composed of two villages, Albina and Tichilești.

The commune is home to a youth detention center, the Penitentiary for minors and young people.

== Natives ==
- Constantin Sandu-Aldea (1874 – 1927), agronomist and prose writer
