= Grădiștea, Brăila =

Grădiștea
- Commune
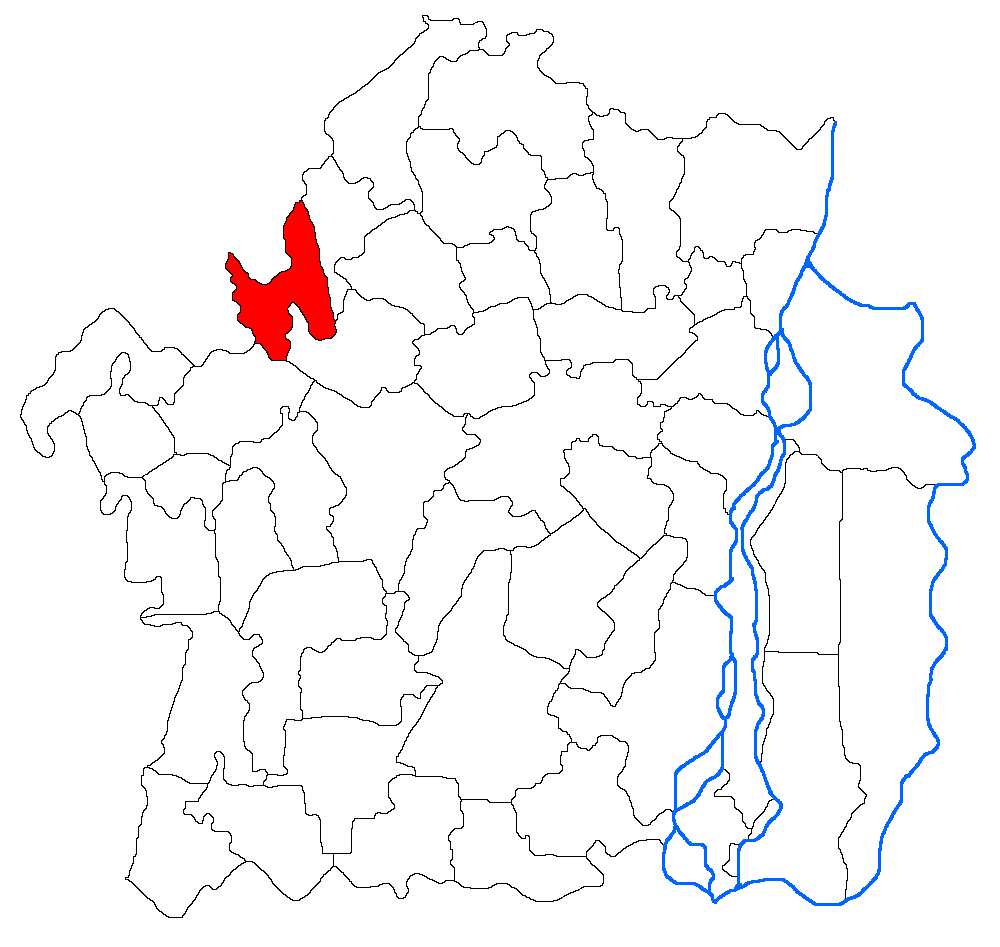
- Location in Brăila County

- Location in Romania
- Coordinates: 45°16′N 27°23′E
- Country: Romania
- County: Brăila

Government
  - Mayor (2020–2024): Petre Andrei (PNL)
- Area: 61.16 km^{2} (23.61 sq mi)
- Elevation: 28 m (92 ft)
- Population (2021-12-01): 2,115
  - Density: 35/km^{2} (90/sq mi)
- Time zone: EET/EEST (UTC+2/+3)
- Postal code: 817065
- Area code: +(40) 239
- Vehicle reg.: BR
- Website: www.primariagradisteabraila.ro

Grădiștea is a commune located in Brăila County, Muntenia, Romania. It is composed of three villages: Grădiștea, Ibrianu, and Maraloiu.

The commune is situated in the Bărăgan Plain, on the banks of the Buzău River. It is located in the northwestern part of Brăila County, 18 km (11 mi) north of the town of Ianca and 51 km (32 mi) west of the county seat, Brăila, on the border with Buzău County. Grădiștea is crossed by national road DN22, which connects Brăila to Râmnicu Sărat.

== Natives ==
- Fănuș Neagu (1932–2011), Romanian writer
