= Dan Pița =

Romanian film director and screenwriter (born 1938)

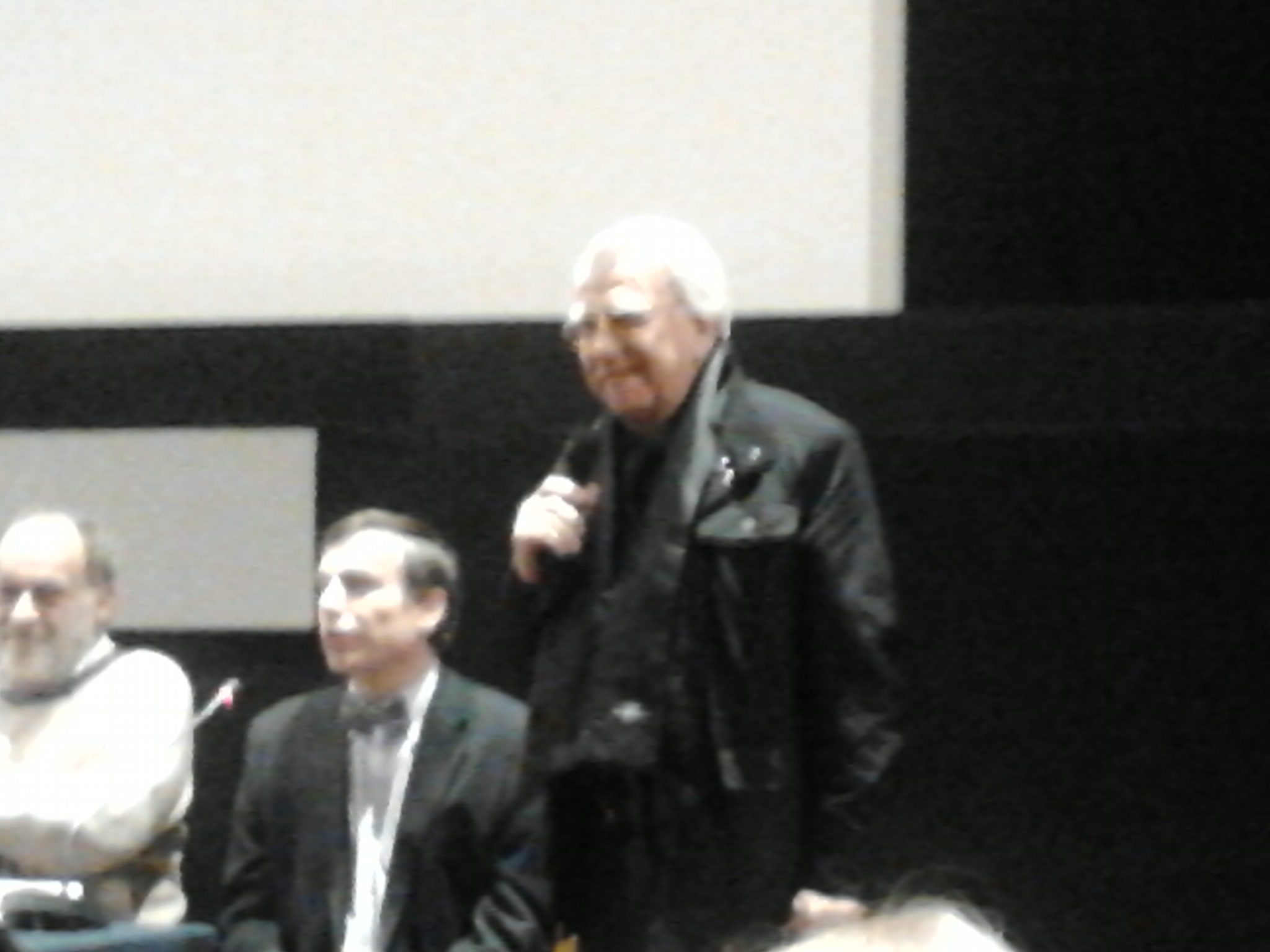
- Film director Dan Pita in Cinemateca Portuguesa, Lisbon, Portugal
- Born: 11 October 1938 (age 86); Dorohoi, Botoșani County, Romania
- Occupation: Director & Screenwriter

Dan Pița (Romanian pronunciation: [dan ˈpit͡sa]; born 11 October 1938 in Dorohoi, Botoșani County, Romania) is a Romanian film director and screenwriter.

== Career ==
Pița has directed several award-winning films since 1970, including the 1985 hit Pas în doi, which won an Honourable Mention at the 36th Berlin International Film Festival. In 1987, he was a member of the jury at the 37th Berlin International Film Festival. In 1992, Pița also won the Silver Lion (Leone d'Argento) at the 49th Venice Film Festival for Hotel de Lux.

== Filmography ==
- Kira Kiralina (2013)
- Ceva bun de la viață (2011) Something Good Out of Life
- Femeia visurilor (2005)
- Second Hand (2005)
- Omul zilei (1997) The Man of the Day
- Eu sunt Adam (1996)
- Pepe & Fifi (1994)
- Hotel de lux (1992) Luxury Hotel
- Autor anonim, model necunoscut (1989) Anonymous Author, Unknown Model
- Noiembrie, ultimul bal (1989) The Last Ball in November
- Rochia albă de dantelă (1988) The White Lace Dress (USA)
- Pas în doi (1985) Paso Doble
- Dreptate în lanțuri (1983) Chained Justice (USA)
- Faleze de nisip (1983) Sand Cliffs adaptation of the novel Sand Days/Zile de Nisip by Bujor Nedelcovici
- Concurs (1982) The Contest
- Prea tineri pentru riduri (1982) Too Young for Wrinkles
- Pruncul, petrolul și ardelenii (1981) The Oil, the Baby and the Transylvanians
- Bietul Ioanide (1979) Memories from an Old Chest of Drawers
- Mai presus de orice (1978) This Above All
- Profetul, aurul și ardelenii (1978) The Prophet, the Gold and the Transylvanians
- Tănase Scatiu (1976) A Summer Tale
- Filip cel Bun (1975) Filip the Kind
- Duhul aurului (1974) Gold Fever, Lust for Gold
- August în flăcări (1973) (TV) August in Flames
- Nunta de piatră (1972) (segment "At a Wedding") The Stone Wedding
- Apa ca un bivol negru (1970) Black Buffalo Water
- Viața în roz (1969) La vie en rose
- Dupaamiază obișnuită (1968) An Ordinary Afternoon
- Paradisul (1967) Paradise
