= Emil Botta =

Romanian actor, poet and prose writer (1911–1977)

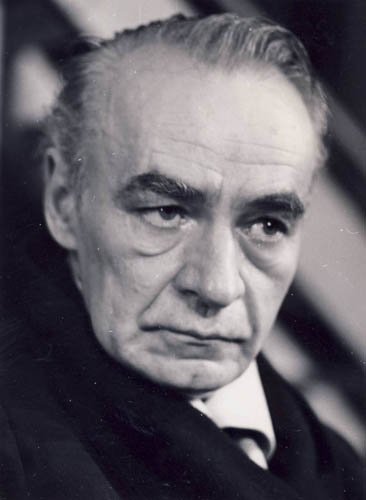
- Portrait photograph of the aging Botta
- Born: 15 September 1911; Adjud, Putna County, Kingdom of Romania
- Died: 24 July 1977 (aged 65); Bucharest, Socialist Republic of Romania
- Occupations: Actor; journalist; theatrical producer; translator; civil servant
- Writing career
- Period: c. 1929–1977
- Genres: Lyric poetry; elegy; novella; sketch story; prose poem; sound poetry; fantasy literature; satire; essay
- Movements: Modernism; Hermeticism; Expressionism; Surrealism; Neo-romanticism; Existentialism

Emil Botta (Romanian pronunciation: [eˈmil ˈbota]; 15 September 1911 – 24 July 1977) was a Romanian actor, poet and prose writer, the younger brother of poet-essayist Dan Botta. Though born in Western Moldavia, the two boys were raised by their Corsican mother in Muscel County; as a teenager, Emil rebelled against his upbringing and ran away to Bucharest. Upon arriving there, he embraced a bohemian lifestyle that clashed with Dan's academic success; he took small jobs, had samples of his poetry and film criticism published, and, upon graduating from the Conservatory for Dramatic Arts, began a short career in boulevard comedies. As an opinion leader in the early 1930s, he rallied with the avant-garde's struggle against the "old folks", forming an anti-establishment club called "Ship of Failures". His career as an actor was finally launched in 1938, when he drew notice for his performance as Young Werther in production at the National Theater Bucharest (TNB). He found permanent employment on that troupe, developing an acting style that critics viewed as unique and fascinating, if "mannerist".

Botta also achieved fame as a writer, with poetic cycles which came to be regarded as some of the best in Romanian literature. Rooted in modernism, with surrealist, expressionist and hermeticist characteristics, his verse opened itself to borrowings from neo-romanticism, dark romanticism, and Romanian folklore; increasingly "bookish" in nature, it was also informed by Botta's study of Shakespearean tragedies. Like his parallel forays into fantasy literature, it illustrated Botta's brand of existentialism, and his belief in life as a series of "masks". In the politicized climate of the interwar, Botta was an independent, though he remained close to fascist intellectuals—including his brother, who had sided with the Iron Guard. During World War II, he was preserved as a TNB actor by the Guard's National Legionary State, and then by Ion Antonescu's dictatorial regime; he survived as an actor after the anti-fascist coup of August 1944, being subsequently cast in socialist plays, but also in some early adaptations of American theater. He alternated these with a classical repertory, and was a much celebrated Othello.

After the inauguration of the Romanian communist regime in 1947–1948, and throughout the 1950s, Botta came to be relied upon by the new socialist-realist establishment, appearing in numerous stagings of Russian and Soviet plays. Though he received national accolades for this work, he was effectively banned from publishing his poetry, which was entirely incompatible with the new aesthetic standards; he also led an ascetic and increasingly lonely existence. The de-Stalinization process which began in the late 1950s saw him taking on more diverse roles: on the TNB stage, he was beloved as Crazy Ion in Ion Luca Caragiale's Năpasta; in his film career, he became a favorite actor of Ion Popescu-Gopo, beginning with a celebrated cameo in A Bomb Was Stolen. In the relaxed political climate, Botta was also rediscovered as a writer, and had his work reedited; he then began writing new poems. He became sought after as a voice actor, and earned additional exposure for his work with Lucian Pintilie on The Reenactment—which mounted a direct challenge to the communist regime's official tenets. In the 1970s, Botta's health declined sharply, something which his friends attributed to his years of wanton physical consumption. He died of heart disease at a hospital in Bucharest, shortly before his 66th birthday.

== Biography ==
=== Early life and debut ===
Emil and his elder brother Dan were from a mixed family. Their father was physician Toader Bota (also credited as Botta or Botha), a Romanian in Austria-Hungary, who most likely descended from noble stock: his 16th-century ancestors were members of the aristocratic class in the Principality of Transylvania. Toader had supported the cause of Romanian nationalism, and had consequently been harassed in the dual monarchy; he had settled as a political refugee in the Kingdom of Romania. He received Romanian citizenship in December 1899, by which time he was living in Măicănești, Râmnicu Sărat County (Western Moldavia). By 1907, he had been transferred to Aurora Hospital in nearby Adjud, Putna County. This town became the birthplace of both his sons: Dan was the elder (born 26 September 1907); Emil is known to have been born on the morning of 15 September 1911. Some confusion as to this date was created by literary historian George Călinescu (who mistakenly wrote it down as "12 November"); Adjud has been assigned to various administrative jurisdictions in Botta's lifetime, and is now included in Vrancea County—prompting essayist Liviu Ioan Stoiciu to ask what Botta's regional affiliation should ultimately be.

Dan and Emil's mother was Aglaia Francisc, who was Toader's junior by 27 years, and who came to Adjud from Lisaura in Bukovina. Her original surname had been "Franceschi", reflecting her status as the daughter of a Corsican expatriate. Poet Mircea Ivănescu, who met her and her son in the 1950s, recounts rumors that she was descended from Corsican nobility. In July 1912, she filed for divorce; it is not known whether this was ever finalized, but local historian Florin Marian Dîrdală believes that the couple was in any case separated after that date. Dîrdală also proposes that the "tormenting and oppressing" atmosphere created by his parents' quarrels may have shaped Emil Botta's early life, accounting for his willingness to break out of his environment. His father died in 1921 (as a direct result of his activities handling the wounded during the Romanian campaign of World War I); Aglaia received the pension rights, but found these were insufficient for their survival. She moved with Dan and Emil to another part of the country, in Muscel County. From July 1926, she was headmistress of an orphanage in Dragoslavele.

Dan had been sent to study elsewhere: he graduated from Saint Sava High School and began training in classics at the University of Bucharest, while also taking a degree from the National Institute of Physical Education. Emil was instead a mediocre student at the Dinicu Golescu High School in Câmpulung. Idolizing his brother, he ran away from home at age 15 and followed him to Bucharest; this initiative reportedly drove Aglaia to despair. Emil's formal education remained patchy, though he eventually managed to take his Baccalaureate (possibly at Cluj). Living in Dan's home, he took low-paying jobs, and was for a while a clerk at the Institute of Statistics. His close friend, Arșavir Acterian, calls him "self-taught". He recalls that young Botta had learned by heart all of Mihai Eminescu's poems, and was replicating Eminescu's lifestyle. Botta was additionally reading from diverse other sources, being introduced to the poetry of Charles Baudelaire, Friedrich Hölderlin, Alexandru Macedonski, Gérard de Nerval, and Edgar Allan Poe, but also became passionate about Romanian folklore (picked out by him from collections by G. Dem. Teodorescu and Béla Bartók).

Emil Botta's own debut as a poet came on 10 June 1929, when his verse was taken up in Tudor Arghezi's Bilete de Papagal; the same magazine later hosted his first sketch story. He and Camil Baltazar visited Arghezi, and Botta declared himself touched by Arghezi's "warmth" and "zest for understanding". In time, he became associated with the newspaper Vremea, which featured his film chronicles, as well as with a magazine called România Literară, which published his essays and poems—as well as fragments from his incomplete novel, Meridian. As attested by Ivănescu, some thirty years later Botta would not clarify if the novel was ever completed, and showed little interest in having it published.

Other contributions by young Botta saw print in modernist magazines such as Discobolul, Caravana, XY, Cristalul, and Lucian Boz's Ulise. He announced that he would publish a play, as well as a small selection of his poems in a collective volume (alongside Mihai Dan and Corneliu Temenschi). In 1929–1933, Botta was enlisted at the Bucharest Conservatory for Dramatic Arts, studying under Ion Livescu. He made his stage debut with George Mihail Zamfirescu's troupe, "13+1", in a December 1932 production of Ferdinand Bruckner's Illness of Youth. Livescu brought his pupil to Chișinău, in Bessarabia, but Botta apparently never managed to obtain a role in any Livescu production. He was reportedly incompatible with Livescu's acting methods, but found value in his Conservatory years, mainly because of the instruction he received in matters of theatrical history—as provided to him by the in-house specialist, Alice Voinescu.

=== "Ship of Failures" period ===
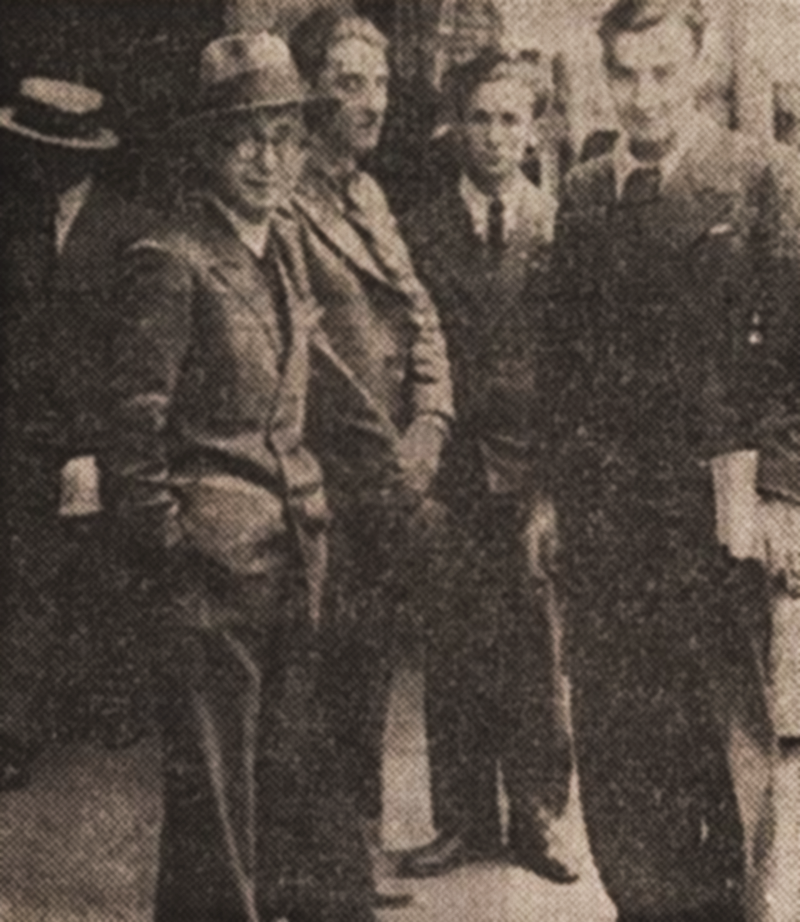
From the right: Botta, Alexandru Robot, Eugen Jebeleanu and Andrei Tudor, photographed c. 1935

In the early 1930s, the Bottas developed distinct outlooks on society, and consequently had distinct paths to success. In 1935, Dan embraced elitism, "with borrowings from the far-right's ideology", slowly developing an "ecstatic vision on Romanian history and spirituality." Emil took a political stance in March 1932, when he signed up to a manifesto against Prime Minister Nicolae Iorga. It was published in a special issue of Sandu Tudor's Floarea de Foc, alongside similar pieces by Zamfirescu, Eugène Ionesco, Horia Stamatu, Ionathan X. Uranus and Mircea Vulcănescu; their collective stance prompted Iorga to ban their magazine. In 1933–1937, Botta was in Bucharest, having largely abandoned his calling; a bohemian tormented by anguish about his future, he joined the "Ship of Failures" (Corabia cu Ratați)—some of whose other members were Acterian, Stamatu, Emil Cioran, and Pericle Martinescu. Acterian himself notes the additional participation of other figures, including Temenschi, poet Alexandru Robot, and violinist Gheorghe Popovici. The latter was also a financial backer, lending money at no interest (as Acterian recalls, Botta was not a stranger to poverty); these funds were spent on frugal luncheons at Herdan Coffeehouse.

This informal society is described by Marinescu as anti-bourgeois (since its members were only "failures" when compared to the fashionable parvenus), and by Stoiciu as ultimately avant-garde. It worshiped Arthur Rimbaud and used his exhortation, Oisive jeunesse! ("O Idle Youth!"), as a members' salute. They played pranks on more established writers and journalists, and once managed to stick a sign reading Șalău proaspăt ("Fresh zander") to the coat of a local press magnate. Botta was happy to discover an abandoned prop, shaped like a ship, outside Oteteleșeanu Restaurant, which he then claimed as belonging to him and his colleagues. The group had a "fleeting existence"; Cioran, who regarded Botta as "one of the most easily lovable creatures I ever had the chance of encountering", reports that they never again saw one another after 1935.

Despite his radical poses, Botta continued to have a measure of artistic discipline, and was regularly published in magazines such as Facla, Arta și Omul, Meridian, Reporter and Litere, also returning as a permanent columnist in Vremea (to 1938). He began working as a comedian at Marconi beer garden, located in northern Bucharest and rented by stage director Sică Alexandrescu; in summer 1936, he appeared there in an adaptation from Franz Arnold and Ernst Bach (Grigore Vasiliu-Birlic was the lead). From September, the same company, as a subsidiary of Comedia Theater, had him starring in Dodie Smith's Call It a Day—with the female lead played by Leny Caler. Botta reportedly felt shame for doing such work, viewing the productions as exceptionally lowbrow.

Botta eventually managed to sign a contract with the National Theater Bucharest (TNB), but only played minor parts until 1938. In 1935–1936, he led another literary circle, called "The Lovers of Muses" (Curtezanii Muzelor), which was explicitly directed against the "old folks" in Romanian culture. Around that time, he reportedly spent much time loitering outside Casa Capșa restaurant, catching glimpses of literary "gods" such as Ion Barbu, Ion Minulescu, and Al. T. Stamatiad. A younger poet, Petre Pascu, was happy to meet him there, counting himself among Botta's admirers; Botta received this tribute somberly, and announced that he would burn all his Bilete de Papagal poems (though he never did). The journal Ideea Românească hosted Botta's poetic cycle, Marele păianjen, which was enthusiastically welcomed and advertised by Ionesco; Romania's official publishing house, Fundațiile Regale, presented it with its annual award, and then published it, as part of the larger volume Întunecatul April ("That Darkened April"), in 1937. This was followed in 1938 by a selection of Botta's novellas, put out by Editura Vremea as Trântorul ("The Cadger").

=== Meșterul Manole years ===
For a while in mid-1937, Botta appeared at Comedia Theater in Axel Nielsen's Kontuschowka. He ultimately had his breakthrough in late 1938, upon appearing on stage as "Young Werther"—the show was created for the TNB by Marietta Sadova and Lucia Demetrius. This was also his first collaboration with director Ion Șahighian. The premiere was attended by a group of friends, including Mircea Eliade and Jeni Arnotă. The latter noted that "Emil was a bit stiff at first. [...] It's obvious, if we're being objective, that he still has much work ahead of him before we may consider him a great actor." Reviewer Ion Anestin was more impressed, describing his surprise that "such a very young actor" had managed to captivate in a demanding role. Anestin opined that Botta "is the only person who could have brought to life at least part of that passionate character." Șahighian gave Botta his first film role, in the 1939 production Se-aprind făcliile. In early 1939, Botta was used by Ion Sava in his acclaimed adaptation of L'Annonce faite à Marie—the only one of Paul Claudel's plays to have been performed in Romania at that moment in time.

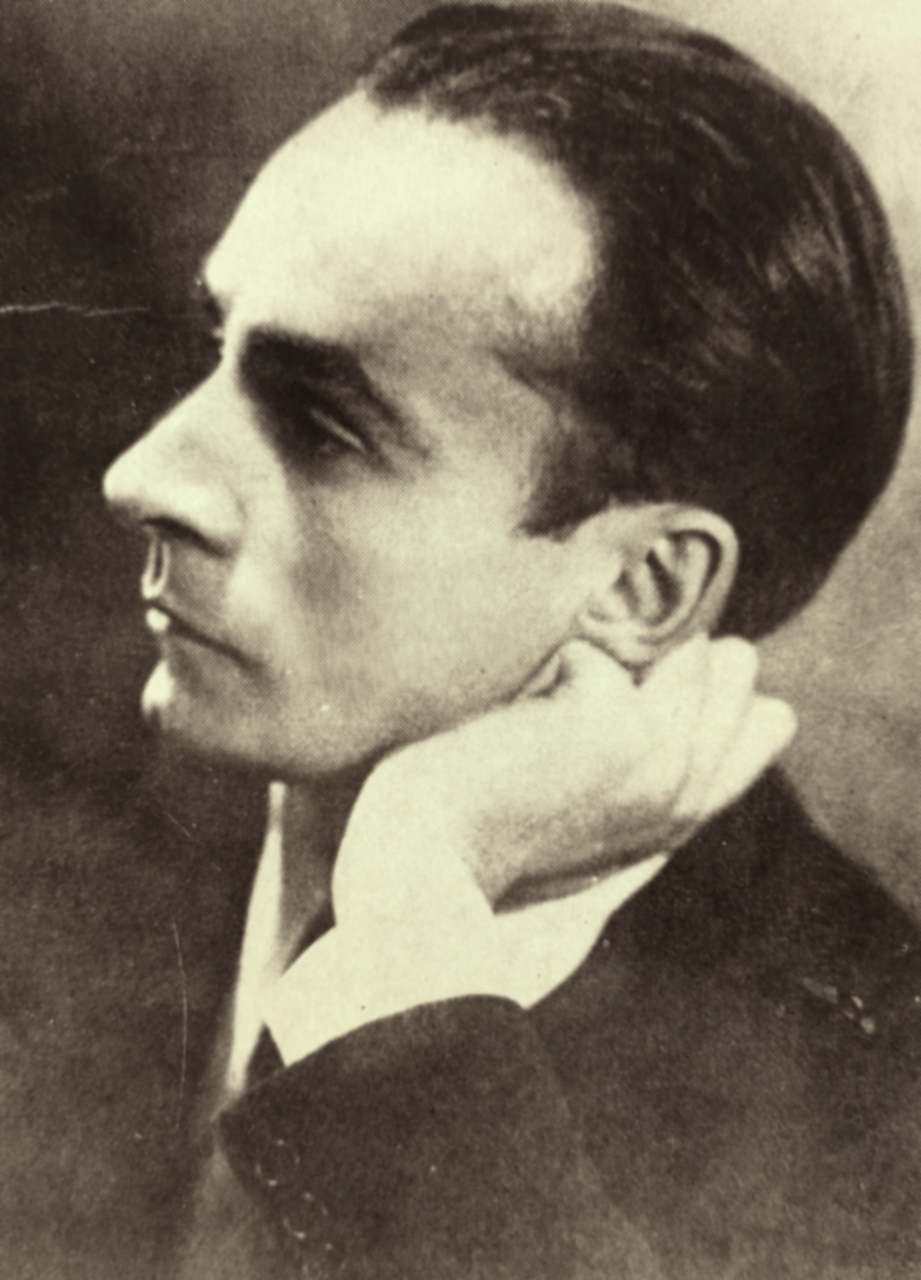
Botta c. 1939

From March 1939, Botta and Martinescu joined a literary circle formed around Meșterul Manole magazine, whose leadership was increasingly supportive of the Iron Guard. The latter, a revolutionary fascist movement, was being openly endorsed by Dan Botta, who was nevertheless also a member of Carol's own National Renaissance Front, from January. According to literary historian Paul Cernat, the younger Botta brother was fundamentally apolitical, one of various intellectual comprising the "non-extremist area of a heterogeneous generation".

In tandem to his Meșterul Manole affiliation, Emil was featured with ample poetic cycles in Universul Literar and Revista Fundațiilor Regale—forming the basis of his 1943 volume, Pe-o gură de rai ("At the Mouth of Heaven"). In March 1940, some of these were being read out at a dance-and-poetry gala, with performances by Floria Capsali and stage design by Mac Constantinescu. In July, as Romania began preparing for the possibility of entering World War II, the poet was drafted into the Romanian Land Forces, and sent to a garrison in Focșani. Despite being married to a fellow actress known as Ulpia Botta until at least mid-1940, he became romantically involved with another actress who took his surname: known as Maria (or Mimi) Botta, she was also being pursued by dramatist Camil Petrescu. During his term as TNB chairman (1938–1939), the latter had proposed sacking Emil Botta, described by him as "talentless".

In September 1940, Carol was ousted, and the National Legionary State was formed, as a partnership between General Ion Antonescu (as Conducător) and the Iron Guard; this period also inaugurated Romania's alignment with Nazi Germany and the Axis powers. Under this regime, Radu Gyr was appointed General Director of Theaters, effectively chairing the TNB, where he attempted to introduce an all-Guardist repertoire. In November 1940, the season opened with a premiere of Ion Luca's Icarii de pe Argeș, which represented a nationalist take on the Meșterul Manole myth; Botta appeared as the central character, Manole. As noted by theatrical historian Ioan Massoff, Luca's "bizarre" text was not necessarily Guardist, though it came to be perceived as such in later years.

During those months, the press began investigating the Bottas' origins, asking Dan to account for his mother's ethnicity. Emil responded publicly on his behalf, announcing that he considered the subject off-limits, and that he resented the press' "ferocious politeness" in asking such questions; he also reminded readers that his father had been a combatant for Romanian rights. According to the anti-fascist Ionesco, who had self-exiled himself, Emil was still close to the Guardist authorities, and could be seen walking about Bucharest "his arms wrapped around a Legionary policeman, an unspeakably ugly and swarthy fella".

=== Under Antonescu ===
The Guardist ascendancy was curbed during the rebellion of January 1941, upon which Antonescu emerged as the unchallenged dictator. The events caught Botta in Bucharest: after a three-day suspension of activity, the TNB staged Florin Scărlătescu's comedy, Un om ca toți oamenii, which had Botta as one of the leads. According to poet Vintilă Horia, who reviewed the show for Gândirea, Botta had "great difficulty" adapting himself to the text, his "energy and elan" being far too great when delivering Scărlătescu's "insignificant monologues and stupid lines". As the newly appointed TNB chairman, Liviu Rebreanu cancelled Icarii de pe Argeș, and instead reintroduced performances of Mihail Sorbul's Red Passion. The play, seen by the enraged Luca as the vehicle for "Jewish ideology" (ideologie ovreiască), had Botta appearing as Castriș. His contribution attracted praise from reviewer Traian T. Lalescu, who remarked that he had managed to revive a secondary character, who had been entirely forgettable in Sorbul's original text.

During May 1941, the Ministry of Propaganda assigned Botta and other actors to entertain Serb Romanian prisoners of war, captured during the invasion of Yugoslavia and held on Romanian soil. In October, Emil and Mimi Botta were used by Fernando De Crucciati in his production of Luigi Pirandello's Tonight We Improvise, at the TNB. Early the next year, at the TNB Studio, he appeared in Surorile Aman, by Sanda Cocărescu—with Alexandrescu invited in to direct. In the 1942–1943 season, he was Pylades in Gerhart Hauptmann's Iphigenie in Delphi, which Paul Mundorf had been called in to direct on the TNB's main stage; the premiere was attended by Bernhard Rust, the Reich Ministry of Science, Education and Culture. As reported by Massoff, Botta and the others members of the troupe gave decent performances, but the production was overall "mediocre" (mainly because Mundorf spoke no Romanian), and was cancelled after only eight shows. At the Studio, Botta was appearing in, and drawing acclaim for, a two-plays show based on works by Dimitrie Anghel and Ștefan Octavian Iosif.

In September 1943, as Antonescu's regime was entering its final year, journalist Aristide Manu proclaimed Emil Botta as "the greatest Romanian poet alive", launching a survey on this issue. The results came in favoring Arghezi—which alarmed the authorities, since Arghezi had been imprisoned for his anti-Nazi literature. At that same time, Botta was Liapkin-Tiapkin in Nikolai Gogol's Government Inspector—a version heavily adapted by Șahighian. Both he and Mimi Botta were featured in Sava's production of Allan Laughton Martin's romantic comedy, Chains. Early 1944 saw him appearing as the Duke of Cornwall in Șahighian's version of King Lear. The text was based on a controversial translation by Dragoș Protopopescu, which spectators rejected; the production had empty seats even during its premiere in March. In June, with Bucharest increasingly targeted by air raids, both Botta brothers were spending time in Novaci, where Dan and their friend Acterian worked on publishing Enciclopedia României.

=== August coup ===
The coup of August 1944 toppled Antonescu and brought Romania into the Allies' orbit. At the time, Botta was appearing as Oswald Alving in Henrik Ibsen's Ghosts, in a highly popular staging at the Studio. The end of war, and the onset of a Soviet occupation, signaled a leftward shift in Romanian society, affecting both Bottas. Emil ceased writing altogether, and focused mainly on his theatrical work, while Dan began his "years-long penitence." In January 1945, after Nicolae Carandino had been appointed TNB chairman, that institution reopened with Oleksandr Korniychuk's Platon Kretchet—the first-ever Romanian production of a Soviet play, it had Botta as the lead. At the Studio, Carandino and Sava experimented with public taste by producing Yeats' Unicorn from the Stars (as translated by Radu Boureanu). Though praised by critics such as Massoff for Botta's performance and for Magdalena Rădulescu's scenic design, it was reputedly disliked by theatergoers, and closed down after its second show. Into the 1980s, Carandino continued to defend the Yeats show as a "glowing memory" of Romanian theater. Art historian Ion Cazaban suggests that the play was only closed down because of political suspicions that the new regime, increasingly controlled by the Communist Party, held against both Sava and Botta.

The 1945–1946 TNB season, which had Tudor Vianu as chairman, opened (on Vianu's insistence) with Despot Vodă, a historical play by Vasile Alecsandri; Botta had a supporting role, as Spancioc. The production, which received bad press from those who viewed Alecsandri as antiquated, was a major flop. At the Studio, Botta registered more success as Eybert in Ibsen's Hedda Gabler (with Dida Solomon in the title role), but again flopped in Felix Aderca's expressionist play Sburător cu negre plete, which the public generally rejected. From April 1946, he was Astrov in Chekhov's Uncle Vanya, with Aura Buzescu as Sonya. Directed by Moni Ghelerter (who used Botta's literary talents in order to rework the translation from the Russian), it is listed by Massoff as that season's major artistic event. In tandem, Botta had embarked on a collaboration with Comedia Theater, which was programmatically introducing the Romanian public to American theater. He appeared there in plays by, among others, Moss Hart and George S. Kaufman. At Teatrul Mic, he translated (but did not perform in) Philip Barry's Animal Kingdom. Instead, Botta was cast in Fantoma vie, a Grand Guignol-style show produced by the Georgescu-Aria independent company from a text by Georges Banco.

For the 1946–1947 season, Botta returned to the TNB Studio in Charles de Peyret-Chappuis' Frénésie. Massoff remarks on the "valuable cast" and on Ghelerter's fine direction, but also sees the play as unusually dark and off-putting. By January 1947, the TNB's other location, inside Saint Sava National College, premiered Alexandru Kirițescu's Nunta din Perugia. Botta selected to play the "overwhelming" central character, Griffone Baglioni, again under De Crucciati's direction; as noted by Massoff, critics largely saw Nunta din Perugia as that year's best show, though "revisions" had to be accepted under pressure from TNB chairman Zaharia Stancu. In April, Botta also appeared in a supporting role in Arghezi's Seringa, which ridiculed medical incompetence—retelling events from Arghezi's own private life. Massoff recalls that the premiere drew in crowds, and also that some ended up hissing and heckling; Seringa, he adds, "only has documentary value these days." From 23 May, he was Lavrentie in Mihail Davidoglu's debut play, Omul din Ceatal, which the left-wing press saluted as a model play of the new "democratic regime". During off-season, in summer 1947, Botta was active as a producer and manager of his own Drama Association, which he had co-founded with Horia Șerbănescu and other colleagues. They rented Mogador Cinema on Romană Street for stagings of John Millington Synge's Playboy of the Western World (translated into Romanian by Petru Comarnescu, and directed by Marin Iorda, it had Botta himself as the male lead). During the Seringa rehearsals, he had befriended Arghezi, who no longer remembered having published Botta's verse in 1929. Botta gifted him Pe-o gură de rai, which Arghezi then enthusiastically covered in an article for Adevărul.

In late 1947, Romania was transformed into a communist-aligned republic. Stancu, who was kept on at the TNB, gave himself the task of reshaping as a venue for "socialist education"; new statues were adopted, under which Botta was a second-class member of the corporation, with his salary set at 21,000 lei. He was at the time appearing as the titular character in a production of Ruy Blas, having also returned in Seringa—before being cast by Ghelerter in Armand Salacrou's distinctly left-wing play, Les Nuits de la colère, and by Șahighian in the anti-war Island of Peace, by Yevgeni Petrov. Critics disliked his performance in the latter production, since he had "altered his character", appearing "lifeless". From October 1948, Botta was Mercutio in a celebrated production of Romeo and Juliet (with Ghelerter as director, and Mimi Botta as Juliet). Also then, he was Othello in the eponymous play, under N. Massim's direction. Theatrical historian Ileana Berlogea rated this as one of his greatest accomplishments, for identifying the two, actor and character, in the Romanian psyche.

=== Stalinist period ===
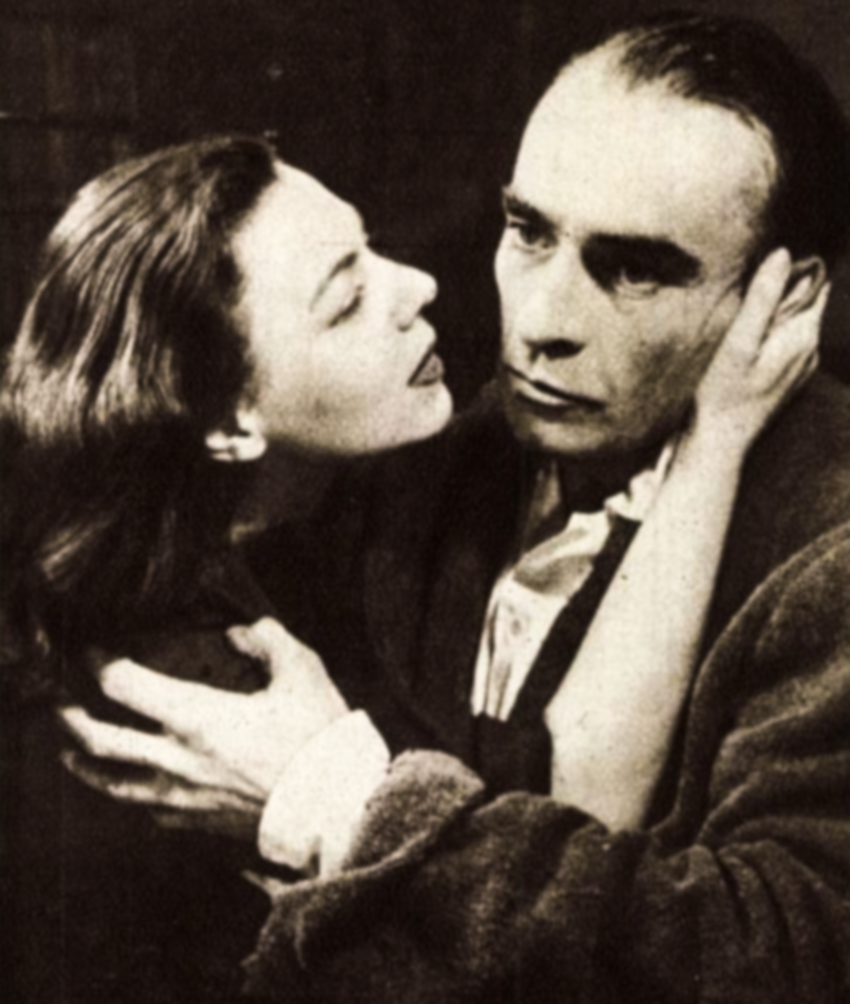
Botta and Marcela Rusu in Citadela sfărîmată (1955)

Botta was also present (or, according to critics, misused) in a version of Carlo Goldoni's Ventaglio. By May 1949, he had been cast alongside George Ciprian, Tantzi Cocea, Alexandru Giugaru and others in Davidoglu's Minerii, a work of proletarian-themed drama. During the 1949–1950 season at the TNB Studio, he had roles in two more Soviet plays: Arvīds Grigulis's Mud and Porcelain and Nikolai Virta's Conspiracy of the Condemned. In January 1950, he appeared as Vershinin in Chekhov's Three Sisters, again directed by Ghelerter, and again welcomed by the public and critics alike. The following month, he was giving public readings from Mikhail Lermontov at the Romanian Society for Friendship with the Soviet Union. By the end of the year, he had been cast as Professor Polezhayev in Leonid Rakhmanov's Restless Youth. In preparation for his part, he studied Nikolay Cherkasov's performance in Baltic Deputy. From 1951, Bulandra (Municipal) Theater had him as a "decrepit", "tragically buffoonish" Neschastlivtsev in Alexander Ostrovsky's Forest. It became a repertory play for the following decade, though Botta was replaced by Septimiu Sever, who had a different take on the role.

In a 2003 piece, literary critic Alex. Ștefănescu argued that the Communist Party was still reluctant to accept Botta's great popularity as an actor, even as he embarked on supporting the regime's propaganda efforts. In 1953, Botta was made an Artist Emeritus of the Republic and inducted into the Order of Labor. That year, he was employed by the National Theater Iași, appearing in Mircea Ștefănescu's historical play, Căruța cu paiațe. He was praised for his performance as actor Mihail Pascaly and as a peasant-puppeteer in the nested play. Critic Ana Gîtlan remarked his "interesting and dramatically intense" Karandyshev in Ostrovsky's Without a Dowry, produced by the TNB in early 1954. Both he and Mimi were awarded the State Prize, Second Class, worth 25,000 lei, for their respective contributions to this production. This treatment contrasted his fading into obscurity as a writer. As suggested by Ștefănescu, the communist regime "had no need for his literature", as it was not just incompatible to the Stalinist dogmas, but also incomprehensible to the political commissars: "Let's amuse ourselves by imagining the sort of grimaces that a communist-party propagandist would have pulled upon reading from Întunecatul April and Pe-o gură de rai."

The 1955–1956 season at the TNB Studio witnessed Ghelerter's production of Horia Lovinescu's Citadela sfărîmată, with Botta as Matei Dragomirescu—whom he himself defined as a "bourgeois intellectual whose reasoning is convoluted, gratuitous and sterile." His performance was panned by critic Vicu Mîndra, who noted that he had failed to pinpoint "the various stages in the protagonist's decay." A contrasting verdict was later provided by Alexandru Mirodan, who described the role as an "example of the interlocking between role and actor". Botta was also drawing praise as a voice actor: in May 1956, the Romanian State Radio had him as Macbeth. According to critic Sorana Coroamă, he and the director, Petre Sava Băleanu, shared credit for the production being exceptional. He was Dante Aligheri in Victor Eftimiu's version of the Faust myth, as directed by Sadova at the TNB during early 1957. Reviewer Florian Potra viewed the play as "lack[ing] both a message and a conflict", describing Botta as affected by a "sacrilegious shyness", which made him uninteresting.

As recounted by Acterian, the actor maintained an "unbelievably bohemian" lifestyle, inhabiting a small apartment split out of the former Orghidan townhouse on Republicii (now Carol) Boulevard. Botta survived his elder brother, whose death was recorded in Bucharest on 13 January 1958. That year, Mircea Ivănescu invited himself into Botta's home, hoping that they could go over his unpublished notebooks. The actor was living alone with his mother, but also hosting "a shy little lady"; he felt pestered by Ivănescu, telling him that he no longer kept any manuscript, and referring to himself as a "defunct writer". Also in 1958, Mimi reportedly witnessed as her aged friend, Ecaterina Bălăcioiu (widow of the literary theorist Eugen Lovinescu), was arrested by the Securitate. Botta himself continued to be employed by the regime was cast in a film version of Petru Dumitriu's Family Jewels—with Jules Cazaban and Willy Ronea, he had a supporting comedic role, meant to denounce the "oligarchic interests" of the old Romanian upper-classes.

=== Năpasta and A Bomb Was Stolen ===
During 1959, Botta was Crazy Ion in Ion Luca Caragiale's Năpasta. Berlogea argues that he gave his best performance, making Ion into a "symbol of all who are downtrodden and oppressed"; journalist Mihnea Gheorghiu suggested that "we should be proud" about Botta's "modern and humane" take on the role. It is seen by literary historian Ion Rotaru as Botta's "last great on-stage creation", and by Pascu as "unforgettable". Also that year, he and Mimi appeared in a stage adaptation of Luceafărul, done by Sadova on Eminescu's centennial. In early 1961, he was cast as Professor Banu in Alexandru Voitin's Oameni care tac. Chronicler Dumitru Solomon, who describes Banu as a fellow traveler of the communists in their "heroic struggle against fascism", disliked Botta's contribution, seen by him as too romanticized. He returned to the screen in Iulian Mihu's Poveste sentimentală, opposite Irina Petrescu; almost forty years later, critic Savel Stiopul described his as a "memorable role".

In tandem, Botta was featured with a secondary role in Mircea Săucan's Cînd primăvara e fierbinte, which showed "the struggle of working peasants in alliance with, and under guidance from, [...] the communist party". He and Olga Tudorache formed a "cynical and frightened" landowning couple. Botta also embarked on a cinematic collaboration with Ion Popescu-Gopo, beginning in 1961–1962 with Gopo's Marxist-humanist fable, A Bomb Was Stolen. He reportedly managed to endear himself to the public by turning his cameo into a "veritable [character] creation". Gopo was positively impressed by Botta's body language, and made efforts to use him in as many films as possible. Also then, Botta returned as Macbeth in a new version, directed by Mihai Berechet on the TNB stage. Critic Florian Nicolae was dismissive, arguing that Botta had both misunderstood Macbeth's motivations and had maintained no mystery as to the play's outcome. Berechet still considered it as one of his greatest projects, with "never-ending applause" on its premiere.

An increasingly de-Stalinized regime now tolerated fuller artistic expression. At the time, Botta could return to the screen in non-ideologized projects: Gopo's Pași pe lună (1963) and Liviu Ciulei's Forest of the Hanged (1965). He was in two other 1965 films: remembered for his original interpretation of the Green Emperor in Gopo's fantasy-comedy, If I Were Harap Alb, he joined the "immense cast" of the epic Răscoala, as directed by Mircea Mureșan. He then appeared in Sergiu Nicolaescu's international project, Dacii (though his voice was dubbed over by Fory Etterle) and as the titular character in Gopo's Dr. Faust XX, which critics disliked for its "linear" plot. Botta was also cast in the police comedy Șah la rege—as Petre Zaran, the antagonist landowner who fakes his own death to evade prosecution. Reviewer Călin Căliman praised only the first half of the film, noting that the second part is a mockery of Botta's talents, showing him engaged in jujutsu-style street-fights. In March 1967, Botta was in Vălenii de Munte, filming on Virgil Calotescu's drama, The Subterranean. From about 1967, he had also embarked on a steady collaboration with the national radio company, with solo recitals from the works of European classics—beginning with Goethe, Heinrich Heine and John Keats—as well as from Romanian folklore (including a sample of Miorița).

Scholar Amalia Lumei suggests that Botta had reached his creative peak as an actor during the "so-called ideological relaxation" that occurred after the death of communist leader Gheorghe Gheorghiu-Dej—and before the curbs imposed in the 1970s by a new dictator, Nicolae Ceaușescu. Mimi, meanwhile, had defected from Romania and joined the anti-communist exile, frequenting Bălăcioiu's daughter, Monica Lovinescu. The latter did not fully trust her, commenting that she was terminally ill and had no hope of relaunching her acting career in the West; she therefore argued that she was prone to Securitate blackmail. Mimi eventually returned to Romania, "preferring to die [...] in her homeland, rather than among strangers".

=== Venerated nonconformist ===
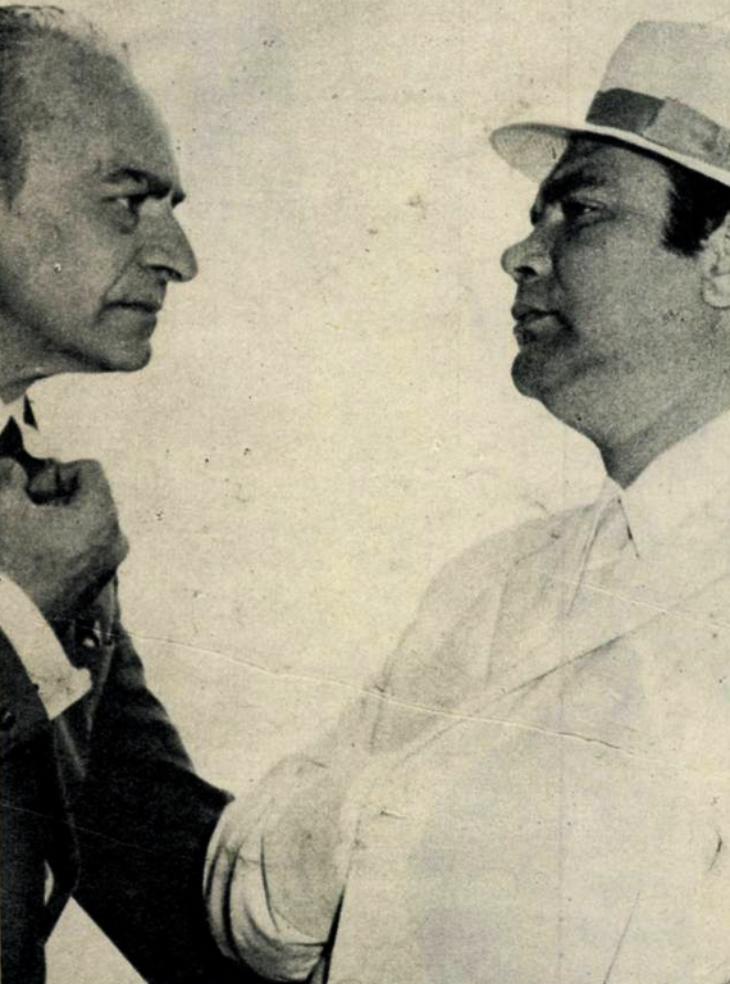
Botta and George Constantin filming on The Reenactment (1968)

As it phased out the official tenets of socialist realism, the regime also allowed Botta to publish his earlier works of literature, including some that had already seen print, and others that had never been issued. They sometimes featured "substantial reworking"—as with the 1966 Poezii ("Poems")—but were still received with enthusiasm by younger critics and writers. In a 2000 piece, scholar Cornel Ungureanu argued that Botta's literary rescue (alongside those of interwar poets Lucian Blaga and Vasile Voiculescu) validated the "reunification of Romanian culture", carried out within a momentary setting of "cultural balance". Ștefănescu believes that the effort was exaggerated, amounting to a "stubborn glorification campaign"—during the critical reassessment, "everything that could be said about Emil Botta's poetry has been said, and then some." Botta received the Meritul Cultural decoration and a special prize of the Romanian Academy, both in 1967, when Trântorul was also reprinted, in an edition curated by Ovid S. Crohmălniceanu. He was now regularly featured in magazines such as Flacăra, Luceafărul, Gazeta Literară, Contemporanul and Ramuri, though many of his contributions there were interwar poems (sometimes entirely rewritten). One exception was his lyrical farewell to the deceased Mimi, published by Luceafărul in November 1968.

In 1968, while filming on The Column (another historical piece, directed by Mircea Drăgan), Botta had a celebrated performance in Lucian Pintilie's politically subversive project, The Reenactment. Pintile used him as the oldest member of his cast, the alcoholic "Professor Paveliu". Botta was also assigned with delivering the lines that carried most political weight: in his inebriation, he brings up issues that the communist regime would have not wished to see discussed at all—even at the height of its liberalizing episode. From the community of exiles, Monica Lovinescu welcomed Pintilie's message, which was about the "infinite flood of stupidity" that still marked the regime's policies in the 1960s, and about how these policies result in a young man's killing. She argues that Botta was the only member of the cast to engage in conscious acting, while the rest "seem to be improvising." The communist censors eventually learned that the film had dissident undertones, and only allowed it a one-theater release, before shelving it altogether. Though independent critics were allowed to praise the film, which was also circulated abroad, Pintilie received strong condemnation in party newspapers, depicted therein as having usurped the "social and moral norms of a socialist society".

Botta also interfered with the communist agenda by frequenting a semi-clandestine coffee-shop managed by Gheorghe Florescu, which had become a regular hangout of Bucharest's cultural elite. Here, he quietly listened in as others berated Arghezi, who had come to publicly endorse the regime, and whom they viewed as an icon of opportunism; he also expressed his gratitude to his host by providing an impromptu recitation from Eminescu. He sometimes conversed with the younger actor Florin Piersic, who had created another version of Crazy Ion at the TNB. Florescu witnessed this encounter between tragedians, during which Piersic reportedly argued that Botta had been a much better Ion than he. During 1969, Botta appeared in the experimental, highly successful "Nocturnes" of Țăndărică Theater, alongside Virgil Ogășanu, Miriam Răducanu, and Niki Wolcz (Andrei Șerban was the uncredited director). Late that year, he was cast in a Bulandra production of Truman Capote's Grass Harp, welcomed in Romania as an anti-consumerist manifesto. According to Berlogea, his interpretation of Judge Cool had "jarring depth".

Botta's rediscovery as a poet was signaled in October 1969, when he and his literary work were showcased by the national television channel, within a series called În prim plan. During the interview, he declared that he no longer considered himself a "nocturnal" being, and that he was "living in full daylight". In December, he appeared on a televised talk show, discussing "art and cybernetics" with engineer Edmond Nicolau and psychiatrist Ion Biberi. Botta's old lyrical work was collected in Versuri ("Verse", 1971) and Poeme ("Poems", 1974); the former included a new poetic cycle, called Vineri ("Friday"), the title of which, Botta explained, referred to several things—including a particular day of 1970. During September 1972, Botta publicly sided with Pintilie, who was having trouble with censorship over his staging of The Government Inspector and had threatened to go on hunger strike over the issue. Botta appeared at the play's third and final showing on 20 September 1972, which was also Pintilie's final contribution to Romanian theater; he kissed the hand of the lead actor, Toma Caragiu, and wrote Pintilie a letter, declaring him a creative genius on par with Eminescu.

=== Final years ===
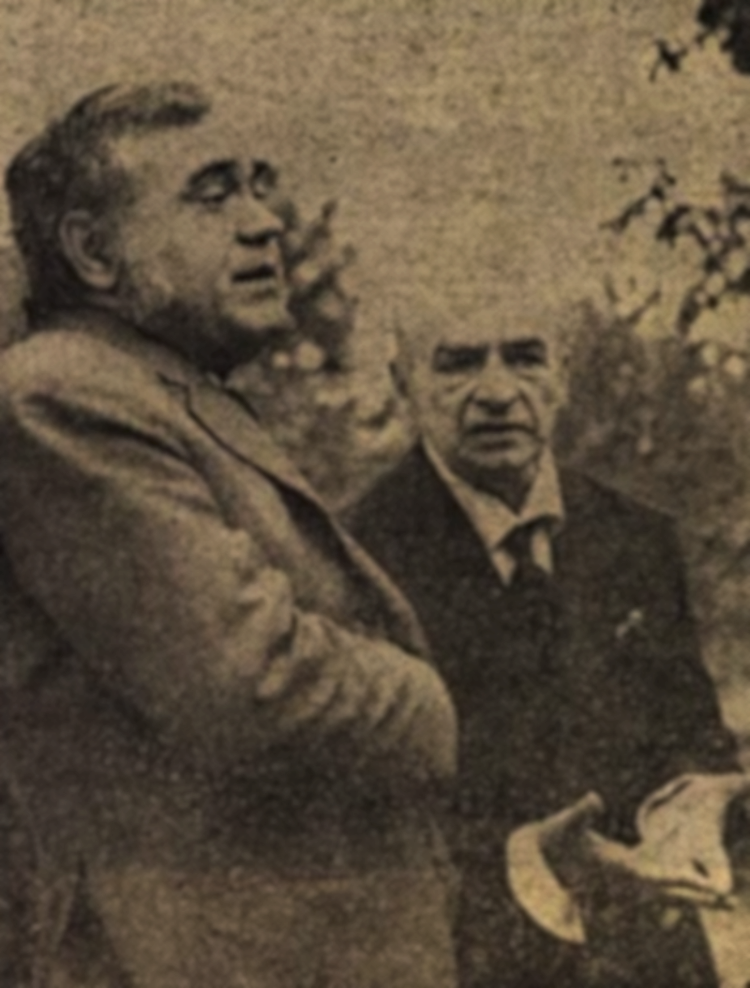
Botta with comedian Dem Rădulescu in 1976

In early 1973, Botta was featured alongside Etterle, Piersic, Constantin Diplan, Emanoil Petruț, and Victor Rebengiuc in a "monumentally sized" TNB production, Un fluture pe lampă. Based on a "politically engaged" text by Paul Everac, it showed anti-communist exiles as morally and materially degraded victims of capitalism. Also that year, Botta was one of the first guests at Cenaclul Flacăra's meetings of writers and their readers. He was introduced there by Alexandru Paleologu and by Cenaclul's main host, Adrian Păunescu. Unusually affected by stage fright, he spoke briefly about his love of all things Romanian, read one of his own poems, and left before the portion of the evening in which others recited from his work. In October 1973, invited by the Museum of Romanian Literature, he appeared at Arghezi's Mărțișor estate in Văcărești, reading from the work of his deceased mentor as part of a televised recital. At the time, he was playing one of the boyars in Barbu Ștefănescu Delavrancea's patriotic classic, Apus de soare—one of the first plays to be performed at the TNB's new location.

In April 1974, Botta and Violeta Andrei starred in a television play, adapted by Tudor Mărăscu from Giraudoux's Ondine. By then, Botta had completed a minor (but studied and attention-grabbing) part in Dincolo de nisipuri, filmed by Radu Gabrea from a novel and screenplay by Fănuș Neagu. He then appeared in Mastodontul, directed by Virgil Calotescu and released in 1975. Here, he gave a noted performance as a geologist with antiquated mannerisms, who follows along as communists rescue a village heavily affected by drought. In 1976, Botta produced a selection of entirely new poetic works, as Un dor fără sațiu ("The Ever-hungry Longing"). A perfectionist, he once asked that four poems be revised even as the book containing them had been printed, and only changed his mind after the editor recited them back to him, proving that they were "not bad".

Botta remained somewhat dissatisfied with Un dor fără sațiu, and in summer 1976 asked Acterian to record in writing his corrections for any future prints. As the latter notes, Botta was by then "physically decomposed" by decades of "physical and spiritual wastefulness." His last encounters also included an interview with Flacăra's George Arion; in late 1976, he appeared in Aurel Baranga's Premiera, structured as a play within a film and as a satirical take on acting itself. Shortly after the devastating earthquake of March 1977, Botta stopped visiting Florescu's shop, ostensibly because the owner was being harassed by communist militiamen. He visited the National Village Museum to witness the arrival of peasants from Țara Hațegului (Cerbăl and Ciulpăz), led there by a local poet, Eugen Evu. He and Evu conversed with each other, with Botta expressing his wish to visit the region; on the spot, he composed one of his final poems, Pădurencele ("Women of the Forest"). In mid-1977, he had checked into Bucharest's Sahia Hospital, to monitor his ventricular fibrillation. A final selection of his new poetry appeared in Viața Românească at around the same time.

Botta is known to have died in hospital on the morning of 24 July, though the details are disputed. According to one account, this was during a routine checkup, immediately after he had replied to the attending physician that he was feeling "very well"; another version is that he died alone, shortly after finishing a final cigarette, and still awaiting for the doctors to see him. The ultimate cause was cardiac arrest. He was buried at Plot 121 in Bellu cemetery, with a ceremony attended by Martinescu and two other surviving members of the "Ship of Failures". The grave contrasted its monumental surroundings by only carrying a simple, wooden cross. Pascu, who visited Botta's apartment in the aftermath, proposed to conserve his belongings and have them sent to the TNB museum, but found that his request was being ignored.

== Personal life ==
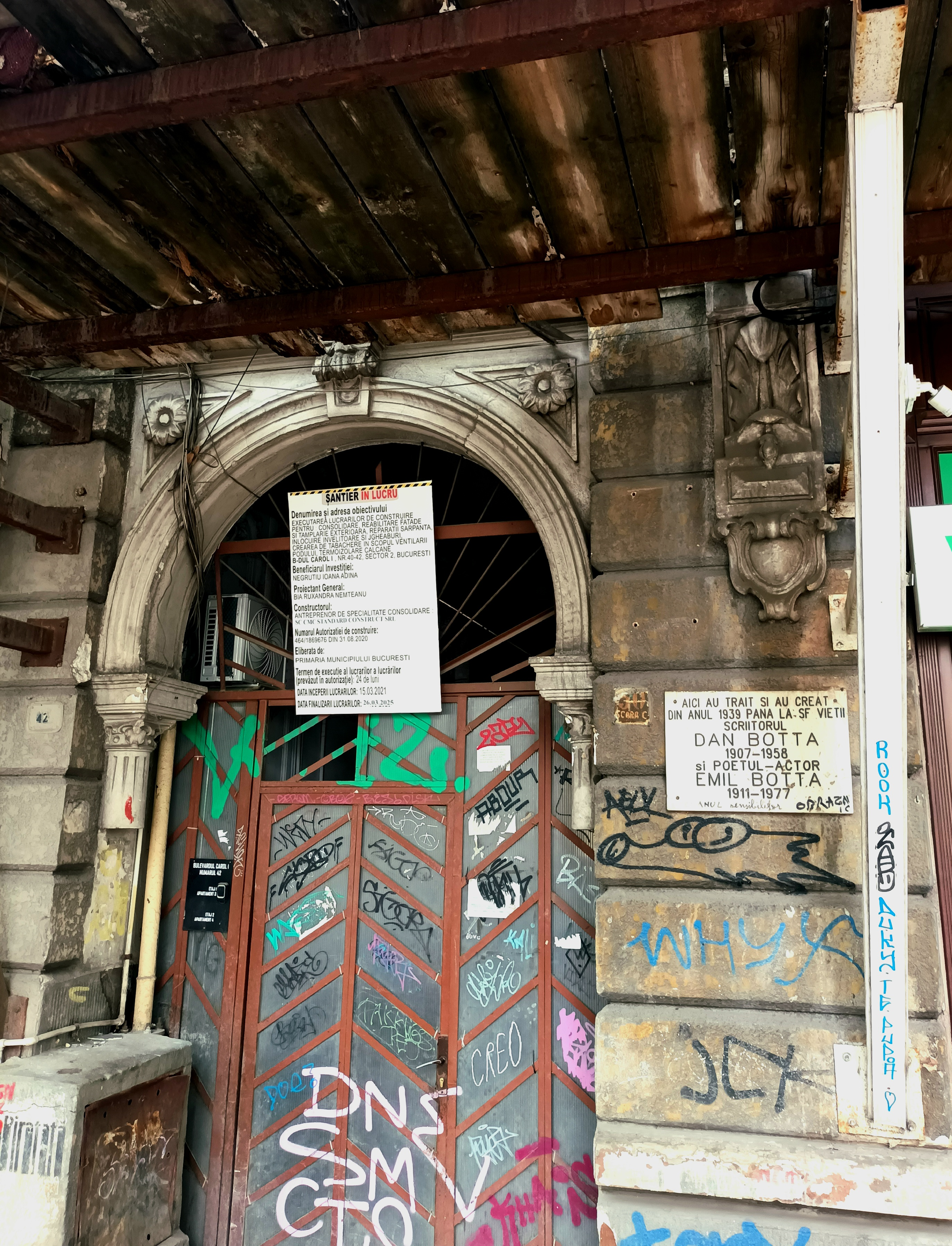
Entrance to the Orghidan house on Carol Boulevard, with memorial plaque honoring the Bottas

Emil Botta had had a childhood baptism into Romanian Orthodoxy, held at the church of Saint Demetrius in Adjud. Though portions of his Pe-o gură de rai are of a quasi-mystical "eruption of religiosity" (hinting at his momentary faith in the "possibility of salvation"), Botta no longer attended church services as a grown man. Acterian reports that he was always respectful of practicing Christians, but that he himself was "all to frightened by death to find in Christianity a spiritual trim and balm." His marital status is the object of speculation. He is only definitively known to have been married once in his life, in 1938, to Finlanda Ulpia Hârjeu—the actress daughter of an architect. Known professionally as "Ulpia Botta", she was seen by Jeni Arnotă as inferior to her husband—in reference to their appearing together in an informal staging of an unnamed play by Eugene O'Neill, in July 1939. She was employed by the Bucharest Municipal Theater during World War II, sometimes appearing alongside Emil.

According to Arnotă's diary entries, Botta was unchanged by his marriage: careless about his public appearance, he also spoke to her about his ongoing fears and "chimeras". To cure his deep depressive state, he would drink heavily, but (Arnotă reports) still managed to preserve his lucidity. In late 1948, having resumed the name of "Ulpia Hârjeu" (or "Hîrjeu"), his spouse moved to Bacău, joining the permanent troupe of that city's national theater. Though Mimi adopted Emil's surname, and was casually known as his "ex-wife" in her final years, she may only have been his fling. In the 1960s, she was married to the philologist Alexandru Balaci. He is known to have pursued several other women, in particular Clody Bertola (she never reciprocated). According to Acterian, he was "a true artist in the field of [female] conquest". As a result, "many women loved him with devotion, in any case more than he had loved them."

Discussing Botta's "unbelievably bohemian" existence, Acterian notes that his partition of the home only had as decorations some pottery items that the actor had bought from itinerant peasants at the nearby Obor market, and a portrait of Dan Botta. A young visitor, the fellow actor George Mihăiță, also commented on his "monk-like simplicity". Once his perfect health had given way to debilitating conditions, Botta maintained only a few female companions, with whom he discussed his mounting loneliness and feelings of despair.

For a while, Botta had been tending to his bedridden mother, who lived upstairs in the Orghidan house. Seeing her decline in such close proximity reportedly contributed to his depression and his making prolonged visits to friends who had a more conventional family life; his editor Nicolae Ioana, who received him on extended visits and heard him "rambling" over the phone, tried to obtain him a larger house. He survived Aglaia's death in May 1975, and, as his poet friend Eugen Jebeleanu recalled, grieved for her "not as a candle that melts away, but as a sword—killing off its own luster, but not tilting". As Eugen Evu writes, in his final year the senior poet was "half-insane", speculating that his strange behavior was from his sense of existential dread. By contrast, critic Valeriu Râpeanu, who spoke with Botta in his final days, recalls that he was "serene, at ease with the great voyages [of death]".

== Acting style ==
As reported by Acterian, Botta was greatly incensed when one of his contemporaries suggested that he was greater as a poet than as an actor. Later reviewers generally agree that his on-stage presence was indeed outstanding—with Jebeleanu once calling him "that Creature from another world". As remembered by Râpeanu, his "spiritual intensity" made it seem like "every phrase, every sentence, every word [was] not just delivered, but torn out of his soul and presented as a tribute to all of us." Literary scholar Victor Durnea writes about his "unmistakable presence" and "intensity of living that bordered on calcination"; "hieratic in his gestures and speech, indifferent to his being seen as a mannerist, he creates around him a singular space of intellectual aristocracy, of painful poetry." His performances were also helped by his having "a supernatural voice and a strange visage". As argued by Massoff, Botta, as one of the "most representative" stage actors of his generation, was unique in his ability to convey Eminescu's "supraterrestrial" melancholy. Similarly, the TNB's Ovidiu Iuliu Moldovan described his Eminescu recitals as transforming Botta into "immense and fascinating medieval wizard." Berlogea elaborates:

His personality was of a unique, inimitable, kind, with an on-stage presence that one could never forget. With his blue, sad eyes, with his high, bulging, luminous forehead, that of a romantic hero, his voice warm, deep, penetrating, Emil Botta was that particular Romanian actor who viewed his roles as nothing more than a grave impulse for meditation and for discovering one's spiritual secrets, a bridge to connect people. He seemed to deny "impersonation", "disguises", the "entering the role", being always himself, with his sad and piercing eyes, with his inner torment, with the tensions and strain of a mind willing to dig into the universal mysteries, bringing them out into the light.

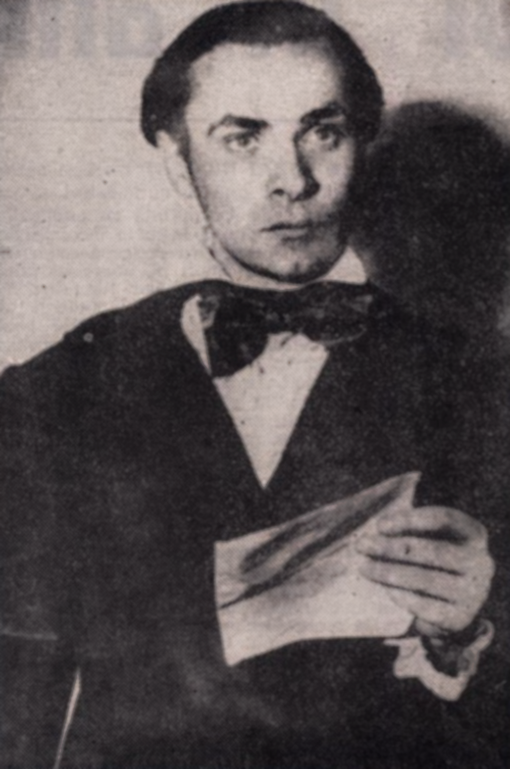
Botta as Young Werther, in 1938

Acterian cautions that his friend's qualities, including his "cavernous" voice, were not necessarily viewed as assets in his lifetime: a "difficult" artist, Botta could be annoyingly "theatrical" and "broodingly somber" as a reciter of poetry. Mihăiță, as the lead actor in The Reenactment, remembers Botta as "a spirit descended from the highest sphere", but displaying "outstanding modesty", and being overall an "example of professionalism." Botta's friends and admirers always viewed him as born to play Prince Hamlet; he was never asked to, except from one fragmentary reading from Vladimir Streinu's translation of the eponymous play. This association seeped into his other work, and literary critics, beginning with Pompiliu Constantinescu, viewed his psychology as a mixture of Hamlet and Pierrot. Another analogy was made by Ion Rotaru, linking Botta to Eminescu's Poor Dionis (whose lines Botta had read out passionately). Also according to Rotaru, Emil Botta was immediately recognizable as distinct from his brother Dan: while the latter turned to neo-classicism, Emil was "tumultuous", only correcting his "displays of pathetic sadness" by adopting some of Dionis' "modern wit". This combination, he argues, produced in the younger brother an "aesthetics of controlled tragedy".

== Literary work ==
=== Main productive period ===
Upon reading Botta's first contribution in prose, Ștefănescu discovered him as a "futurism"—albeit one of mindset (fascinated by "cinema and sports", "eccentric and dangerous"), rather than of style. Botta's primary contributions in his early days were the Vremea film-essays, and his sketches of a personal philosophy. The most explicit among the latter is a piece called Elogiul ipocriziei ("In Praise of Hypocrisy"), wherein he argues that one's self is naturally "vacant", and only gets filled by the expectation of others; elaborating further, he decries man as always in danger of losing this baseline inner-hypocrisy to a more dangerous dishonesty, which is of the criminal kind. Interested in existentialism as well as in thanatology, Botta was influenced by Søren Kierkegaard—commenting on this spiritual lineage, Durnea highlights Botta's "lucidity [...] to the point of self-flagellation", arguing that it stayed with the author in his regular life, and resurfaced whenever he was interviewed by others. As noted by Durnea, the existentialist essays reveal Botta as a writer of "remarkable visual precision", with only some veering "polyphonic obscurity" (in places where Botta either reveals his own "self-searching" or discusses art as being about the "hidden meanings" of life).

Manu's 1943 claim about Botta as "the greatest Romanian poet alive" was backed, in a less provocative setting, by professional critic Alexandru Paleologu, who also depicted Botta as a "doctor in melancholy". In 1941, George Călinescu gave Botta a short profile in his History of Romanian Literature, including him in a generation of surrealists and hermeticists, distinguished from the rest by his "grand romantic hallucinations". Later reviewers include Nicolae Manolescu, who saw Botta as akin to Benjamin Fondane, and as part of an interwar search for "new poetic formats". According to Manolescu, his individualizing trait is in his theatrics, his poetic "masks". Commenting on these, Lovinescu proposes that Botta never managed to obtain the "vacuousness" of the self, the one that is ideally associated with actors. Instead, "his void was peopled by essences"; their discovery prompted him to defend his art against the "outside, all-encompassing, void". Ștefănescu mistrusts the claim that Botta was anguished, and prefers to view him as an "exuberant" poet, in whose "sepulchral rhetoric" death became "just another word, or even an interjection of life's joys."

As read by Durnea, Botta's earliest known poems oscillated between various influences: he borrowed Tudor Arghezi's "descriptive" format, infusing it with borrowings from surrealism, before embracing hermeticism à la Ion Barbu. In a 1980 essay, Ovid S. Crohmălniceanu, building on observations made decades earlier by Vladimir Streinu, observed that Botta was for a while entirely dedicated to imitating Barbu, but that he broke away into a "poetic emancipation", finding himself a "new language". However, Întunecatul April and all other works still maintained subdued influences from Arghezi and Barbu—subverting the "high" register of romanticism and hermeticism, which sometimes veers into sound poetry, with mundane colloquialisms. As argued by Durnea, this technique "indicates mystification" by Botta, with an interplay of images that are "either terrifying or paltry". Întunecatul April is also a poetic companion to his prosaic meditations about death and the self, but with an added "intensity of emotion" and "veritable mythology", leading critics to compare him with George Bacovia; according to Manolescu, Botta is primarily a Bacovian imitator, with the same "ghostly mask". Rotaru locates Botta at the intersection between Bacovia, Poe, Ilarie Voronca, and Shakespearean tragedy, also identifying echoes from Alexandru Macedonski in his "obsession of dying" (albeit "without the Macedonskian anecdote"). Întunecatul April includes an homage to Coleridge, whose open praise of narcotics consumption may account for its being censored out of all communist-era editions.

=== The Shakespearean expressionist ===
Scholar Eugen Simion contends that young Botta was mainly a "musical" and "clear" poet of romantic extraction, having overall "nothing to do with surrealism". He proposes however that Botta, with his "taste for the theatrical and the macabre", was more a modernist than a romantic—and that his love poetry, built on romantic elements, became less conventional with its hints about love as "slavery". Such modernism was always toned down by his imports from neo-romantic traditionalism, or directly from folklore—the elegy, often modeled directly on the ancestral doine and venting Botta's enthusiasm for nature, became an increasingly dominant form of expression, "corroding into [his] solipsism". Pe-o gură de rai, described by Durnea as "one of the great Romanian poetry books", is not just uncharacteristically religious, but also intentionally patriotic—Botta's poetic self embraces figures from Romanian history (he speaks as Gelou, Bărbat, Michael the Brave, Horea, and Avram Iancu). The resulting volume, "with a more pronounced national note" and a love of Eminescu that "turns into a cult", incorporates distinct influences from one of Botta's traditionalist contemporaries, Lucian Blaga.

Botta never allowed himself to be fully incorporated by the traditionalist school. As Crohmălniceanu informs, Pe-o gură de rai is more than anything linked to Shakespeare, with folkloric creatures merely appearing as localized stand-ins for Shakespearean sylphs; Botta also adds a recurring motif of his own, using the blackbird as his symbolic beast in his "personal mythology" (throughout his career, he was unusually discreet about the reason for this selection). The same characteristic is analyzed by Simion, who writes that Botta's imports from "folk mythology" are "suffocated in the aesthete's clichés". Ștefănescu similarly cautions that Botta never became a "traditionalist in spirit", but merely embraced folklore as his "aesthete's fancy." The resulting pieces celebrate the colossal dark forest, personified as a monstrous Briareus ("that thousand-armed titan"), whose contemplation attenuates one's failures and anguish:

De m-ar atinge vraja
romanticei păduri!
Și brazii să-și înalțe
întunecații muri:
Pierdut, prelung răsune
cumplitele bucine,
demonicul tunet
al stâncei carpatine.

Translation:

O had I only been cradled
by the romantic thicket!
And had dark firs been raising
their mulberry picket:
Had the Carpathians only belted
their terrifying bucium,
the faint, demonic thunder
of their rock-laden gloom!

Though Botta labeled his stories as "novellas", they were most often regarded as prose poems located on the margins of fantasy literature. According to Durnea, they belong at once to existentialist philosophy and literary expressionism; Rotaru sees them as having "everyday subjects, but enveloped in a lyrical aura", with additional echoes from Eminescu, whereas critic Henri Zalis reads them as somewhat humorous works with a "disguised satirical incisiveness", similar to prose by Poe and Nathaniel Hawthorne. Their unifying thread is in the "dissolution" of central protagonists (identified by generic names such as "The Cadger" and "The Lamb") under the "unbearable tensions" of living. The protagonists' adventures are determined and sustained by apocalyptic events, such as a "storm of suicidal men", and by the machinations of demonic figures, such as "Bird-Head". Zalis remarks:

With his ability of floating about reality and encapsulating its essence, Emil Botta's voice has obtained freedom, has transgressed beyond things. His perspective, while drawn into the grotesque ballet of pity and disgust, is freed of any despotic subjection. With an innocence that is seriously at odds with the evil events that surround him, the hero-narrator finds himself even as he gets drawn into the whirlwind of the events. The murky, magical feeling emerges from this rediscovery of reality, of a monstrous reality that seems right out of a masquerade.

=== Final poetic cycles ===
Ștefănescu sees all of Botta's poems, including the Vineri cycle, as forming part of an "infinitely productive" continuum, with no clear stylistic breaks between them. He only concedes that the late-stage Botta was somewhat distinguishable for being naturally "tired" and "exclusively bookish". In this final avatar, the poet "reuses elements that are already artsy", relying heavily on Eminescu and Shakespeare as his guides, and eventually producing horror-images with an "automatic" repetitiveness. Ștefănescu focuses his demonstration on the "valuable, memorable poem" Mauzoleul ("The Mausoleum"), which shows Botta reliving a battle scene not as an actual witness to the event, but from viewing a painting; a commentary on "one's captivity within a work of art", it reads:

Și era o groaznică agitare
în acea groaznică nemișcare.
Comandantul era împietrit
ca un stâlp de mirare
și într-o supranemișcare
era țintuit.

Translation:

But there was such awful fretting
in that awfully un-moving setting.
The commander was stuck like a mast—
a rod of stone, an exclamation prop,
motionless, as far as any movement can stop,
forever fastened, and steadfast.

Other commentators provide dissimilar verdicts. Durnea sees Botta's "conjectural optimism" and lyricism, which had surfaced in the 1940s, as fully expunged from his final poetic cycles—though the elegiac note is preserved (and enhanced by the introduction of "allegorical extras"—including "three visiting wolves" and "Not, the one-palm-high giant"). Lovinescu similarly argues that Botta's late poems were also his most authentic, for signaling a total renunciation of defiant attitudes and a fully disarmed confrontation with his existential tragedy. She notes this in Emil's sorrowful depiction of Dan Botta's apotheosis:

E ora când răsare
fratele meu.
Auzi chemarea pădurii:
Vai, cum îl strigă,
îl strigă mereu.

Și luna de sus, prea frumoasă,
stă zugrăvită de vis.
Fratele meu poartă cerul pe umeri
și un oracul în cer stă scris.

Translation:

Now comes that hour set
for my brother's rise.
Hear the forest call on him:
Lo, the forest wails,
Wails in endless cries.

And the moon above, the exquisite moon,
is too well depicted, too dreamy a fit.
My brother carries the sky on his shoulders—
and, see there, oracles are written down on it.

== Legacy ==
With his long and interrupted career in literature, Botta became an influence on several generations of writers: in the 1940s, Constant Tonegaru—who took from Botta an irreverent and self-deprecating poetic voice; in the 1960s, Florin Mugur—who adopted some of Botta's "declamatory [and] theatrical" mannerisms; in the 1970s, Cezar Ivănescu—who embraced elements of Botta's approach to folklore; and in the 1980s, Ileana Mălăncioiu—who was similarly "bookish". Un dor fără sațiu was sold out upon its author's death, and was reprinted in 1979 as the inaugural piece of the Romanian Contemporary Poetry Collection, at Editura Eminescu. This new edition still featured only some of Acterian's updates. A recording of his Năpasta was commercially released as an LP in 1980.

From 1978, the Romanian Academy Library staff formed a literary club, hosted by poet Dragoș Cojocaru and named after Emil Botta. During the next decade, Botta was the subject of two critical monographs, respectively authored by Radu Călin Cristea and Doina Uricariu. Dan Ion Nasta also completed French translations of his various poems, appearing in a bilingual edition in 1985. By then, his lyrical work was being read in dedicated recitals, staged at Bulandra by Miriam Răducanu and at Cluj-Napoca National Theater by Paul Basarab. In 1988, Luca Dumitrescu, who, at 78, may have been Romania's oldest active poet of his day, published a eulogy for Botta, as Prietenul dus ("A Friend Departed").

This recovery trend was continued after the Romanian Revolution of 1989: in 1992, Trântorul was reissued with accompanying essays by Mălăncioiu and Dinu Pillat. Also then, the national television channel produced a number of shows dedicated to Botta—possibly, though not explicitly, meant to mark his 80th birthday; among these was a special edition of the game show, Cine știe, cîștigă. However, as asserted by Stoiciu, he was afterwards relegated to the "second shelf" of literature—and not reread, despite being formally recognized as an "important poet". The same was noted by essaysist and philologist Valentin Tașcu, who proposed that Botta was a victim of his own refusal to step out of his obsessive imagination. Posthumously, Botta's name was assigned to a high school in Adjud, as well as to a street in downtown Bucharest. In a 2007 piece, actor Dionisie Vitcu, who had known Botta in the "twilight of his career", argued that the TNB and Adjud still owed him statues. In 2011, the national radio's publishing label released all of Botta's poetry readings from the 1960 and '70s, sold in CD-format. Also then, his native town inaugurated an "Emil Botta National Poetry Festival". In late 2013, Botta's name was inscribed on a monument located near the Bucharest Walk of Fame.
