= Poor Dionis =

1872 novel by Mihai Eminescu

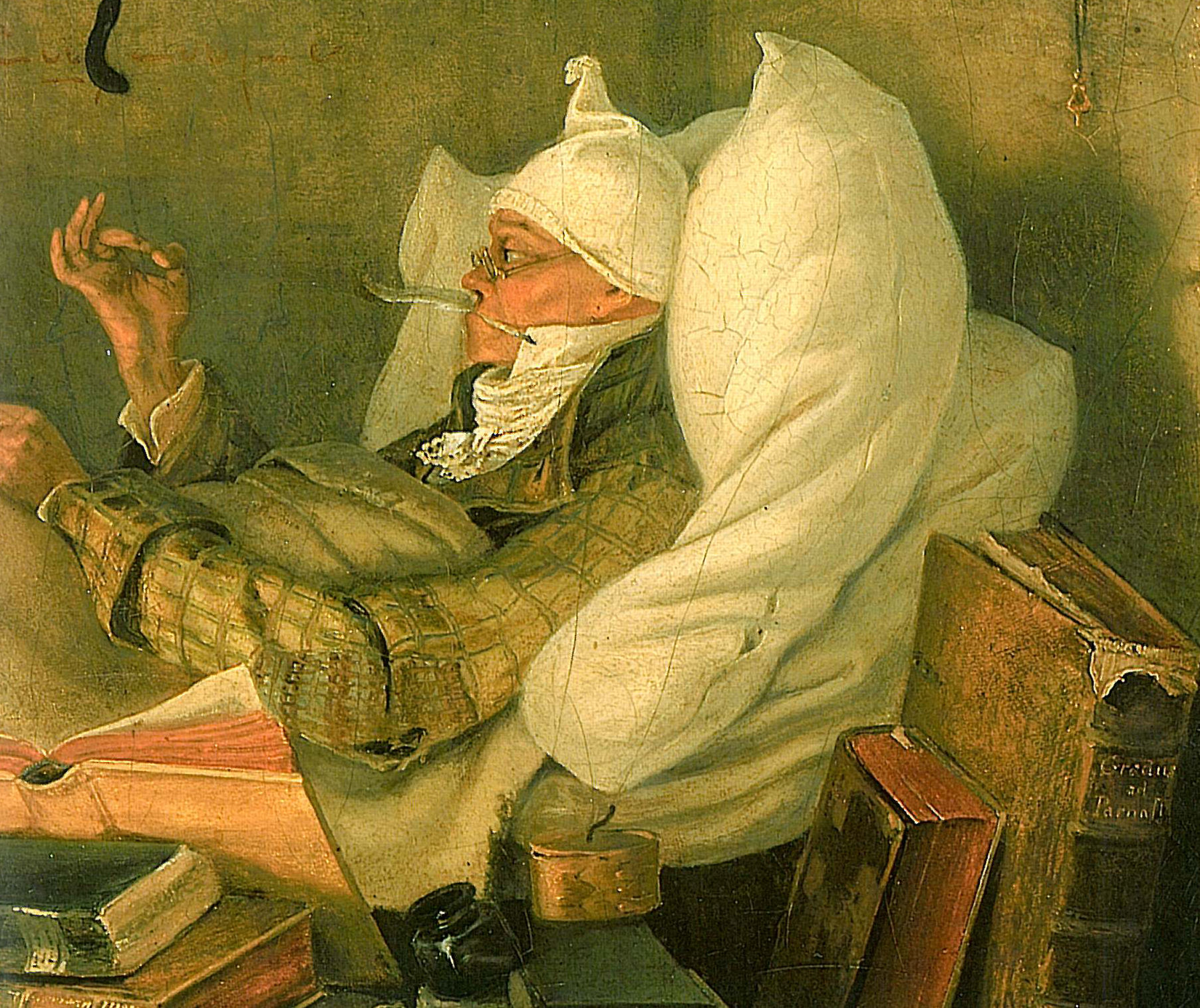
- Detail of Carl Spitzweg's "Poor Poet" (1839), a supposed visual inspiration for Eminescu's story
- Author: Mihai Eminescu
- Original title: Sărmanul Dionis
- Translator: Sylvia Pankhurst
- Language: Romanian
- Genre: Fantasy, historical fantasy, philosophical fiction, satire
- Publication date: 1872
- Publication place: Romania
- English publication date: 1979
- Media type: Print
- OCLC: 635101592
- Original text: Sărmanul Dionis at Romanian Wikisource

Poor Dionis or Poor Dionysus (Romanian: Sărmanul Dionis, originally spelled Sermanul Dionisie; also translated as Wretched Dionysus or The Sorrowful Dionis) is an 1872 fantasy prose work by Romanian poet Mihai Eminescu, classified by scholars as a novel, or a novella. It is a liberal interpretation of contemporary German philosophy and ancient motifs, discussing themes such as time travel and reincarnation through the lens of post-Kantian idealism. Its eponymous central character, a daydreaming scholar, moves between selves over time and space, between his miserable home, his earlier existence as a monk in 15th-century Moldavia, and his higher-level existence as a celestial Zoroaster.

Poor Dionis is one of the first, and most characteristic, works of fantasy in Romanian literature, and one of the poet's last Romantic texts. Beyond its philosophical vocabulary, the story is Eminescu's intertextual homage to the founders of German Romanticism (E. T. A. Hoffmann, Novalis) and modern French literature (Théophile Gautier). Read out by Eminescu upon his induction to Junimea literary club, it was dismissed as an incoherent oddity by critics of the day, and overlooked by researchers before 1900. It was then reevaluated by successive generations, beginning with the Romanian Symbolists, serving to inspire both the modernists and the postmodernists.

Traditionally, Poor Dionis has intrigued researchers with its cultural complexity, discussed in connection with the Vedanta, Gnosticism, or the theory of relativity. Its unreliable depiction of the historical past is also noted in connection with invented tradition, in the context of Romanian nationalism, while its depiction of mundane contemporary scenes may offer autofictional insight into Eminescu's biography. Its favorable depiction of Jews and Judaism also caught attention, and was held in contrast to other works by Eminescu, which border on antisemitism. Various scholars, however, see Poor Dionis mainly as a work of sheer literary fancy.

== Plot ==
Eminescu begins his story in mid-thought, with first-person musings about subjectivity, qualia, time perception, and the physical world being "our soul's dream". The narrator then reveals that this is a quote from the amateur metaphysician Dionis. He describes the latter as an unkempt, but good looking, young Bucharester, reduced to poverty and prone to daydreaming. He is an orphan, born out of wedlock to a mysterious aristocrat and a priest's daughter. Although a passionate esotericist and reader of sacred books, Dionis is more of "a superstitious atheist".

In his miserable room, Dionis is studying an almanac of astrology, and listening, through the open window, to a girl singing; charmed by the sound, he sees (or imagines) the girl as a modern-day Ophelia. In this reverie, his eyes affixed on the zodiac, Dionis understands that he can freely travel back into the glorified past. He chooses for his destination ancient Moldavia, under the rule of Prince Alexander the Good. When he awakens, he finds himself on a meadow near Iași, dressed in Orthodox monastic clothes, and grasping the almanac. He is Friar Dan, who he has only dreamed of being Dionis, and the book is a present from his teacher, Ruben.

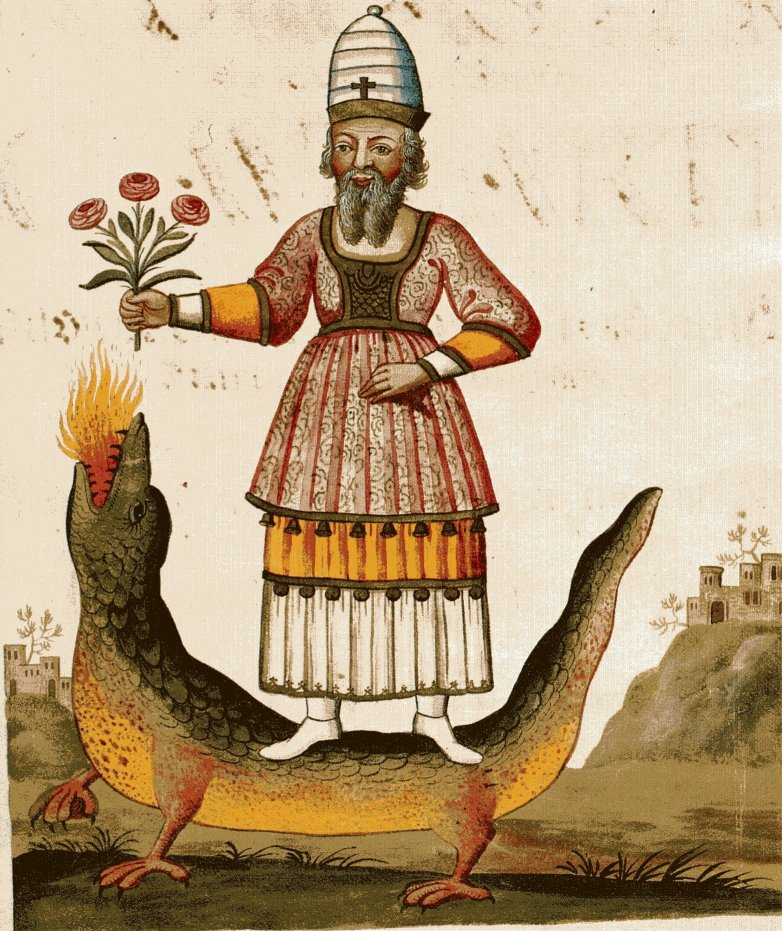
Zoroaster, as depicted in the 18th-century German alchemical treatise, Clavis Artis

Ruben, a learned and pious Sephardi Jew living in exile at the "Socola Academy", has instructed his favorite pupil about "metempsychosis" and apport: "you can slip into the lives of all the ones who led up to your life [and] into all the future lives caused by your present life"; "you can go any place you want, although you cannot leave it void behind you. [...] there's no such thing as fully vacant space." Simultaneous travel in spacetime, Ruben teaches, may only happen if one changes places with one's ancestors or descendants. Taking the Dionis experience as evidence that Ruben is right, Dan asks to be transported into an ideal universe, and is told by his master that such a place exists "in your immortal soul". If Dan wishes to reach it, he is to read every seventh page of a spell book: each will take him to a new place, in no known order, and no location can be visited twice. After Dan leaves, book in hand, Ruben is revealed to have been possessed by Satan, who takes joy at having ensnared a pious monk: the book is in fact an instrument of perdition.

Back in his room, Dan decides to use the book for an egotistic purpose. He is in love with Maria, daughter of Spatharios Mesteacăn, and secretly wishes to kidnap her. As Dan weighs in the possibilities, his own shadow begins talking to him, telling him that the book he read was written by the prophet Zoroaster; and that he, Dan, as the reincarnation of Zoroaster, is entitled to use the book as he pleases. The monk and his shadow strike a deal: Dan will assign his mortal's identity to the shadow, while he himself will become a "shape of light", with the shadow's power to transcendent. Under this guise, Dionis visits Maria, and persuades her to make a similar exchange with her own shadow.

As a new Zoroaster, Dan carries his lover to the moon. No longer held back by the laws of physics, he rearranges the celestial sphere and the lunar landscape for Maria's pleasure, building her a heavenly abode, serviced by the angels and decorated with blue flowers; in this arrangement, Earth itself is a contemptible atom, consumed by hatred and war. Dan finds that the entire cosmos is his, except for the inaccessible "dome of God". He becomes obsessed with looking upon the divine countenance, and with reshaping the angels into instruments of his will; Dan begins to formulate a thought, that he himself may be God, and may not be remembering as much.

With this (half-uttered) blasphemy, everything is lost. Feeling himself expelled from Heaven, Dan reawakens as Dionis, and catches a glimpse of the singing girl: "Ophelia" is Dan's Maria. Still confused by his apparent change of status, and not being sure of himself, Dionis decides to write her a letter, confessing his affection. When, from the window, she shows him that the letter has impressed her, Dionis faints with emotion. He is carried to hospital by concerned philanthropists and makes a slow recovery, while Maria secretly arranges to have his room cleaned and refurbished. Dionis wakes up in a beautified home, with Maria watching over him. They become lovers.

In medieval Iași, Dan also experiences a rude awakening, and, like Dionis, is apparently ill. He is visited by a Jewish man, whom he takes for a kaftan- and payot-wearing Ruben—telling him that the shadow he left behind has written a precious memoir. "Ruben" reveals himself to be his book vendor, Riven, and denies any knowledge of their dialogues on metempsychosis. Despondent, Dan begins to suspect that he has been tricked by devils. Eminescu ends his account with a series of open questions, without revealing any explicit moral to the story.

== Publication history and poetic footnote ==
The narrative came with Eminescu's "conclusive notes", and ends with a quote from Romantic poet Théophile Gautier, in Eminescu's own translation. They trace back to a letter on drama, addressed to Gérard de Nerval and published in the 1858 Histoire de l'art dramatique en France depuis vingt-cinq ans III. Eminescu was familiar with them from a fragmentary version, appearing as a quote in Philibert Audebrand's article for L'Illustration, November 2, 1872—some of Audebrand's musings on Gautier are also included right after the quote. Part of the fragment reads:

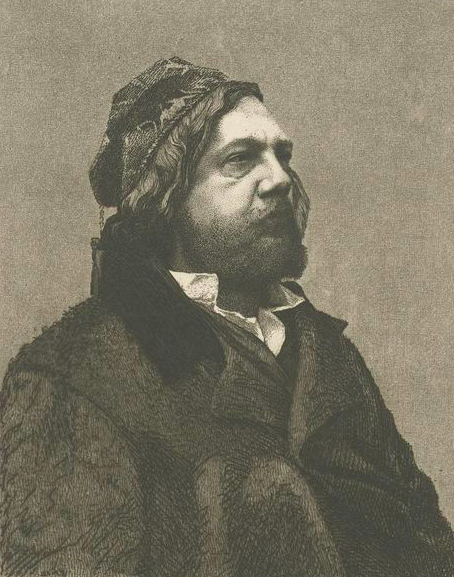
Gautier in Oriental clothes, 1857 etching by Félix Bracquemond

Convorbiri Literare of December 1, 1872, featuring the first installment of Poor Dionis

Nu totdeauna suntem din țara care ne-a văzut născând și de aceea căutăm adevărata noastră patrie. [...] Îmi pare c-am trăit odată în Orient, și când în vremea carnavalului mă deghizez cu vrun caftan, cred a relua adevăratele mele vesminte. Am fost întotdeauna surprins că nu pricep curent limba arabă. Trebuie s-o fi uitat. —Eminescu's translation, with Eminescu's own emphasis; Antologia nuvelei fantastice, p. 726. Also rendered (without emphasis) in Perpessicius, pp. 176, 477–478.	We are not always from the country where we were born ... and so we keep searching for our real homeland. [...] It seems as though I have lived in the Orient, and that during the carnival, when I disguise myself with ... a few authentic baubles, I feel as though I have put on my real clothes. I am frequently surprised by not understanding Arabic. It must be that I have forgotten it. —Translation by Sasha Colby, Stratified Modernism: The Poetics of Excavation from Gautier to Olson, p. 48. Bern: Peter Lang, 2009. ISBN 978-3-03911-932-5; Eminescu's emphasis added.

Eminescu finished writing his story during an extended study trip to Vienna. Reportedly, he first read it to friend and fellow writer Ioan Slavici, whose comments inaugurated a long sequence of negative criticism: at the time, Slavici described the work as merely "bizarre". Another Romanian colleague in Vienna, linguist Vasile Burlă, also found Poor Dionis to be of an "extravagant and sensationalistic" Romantic nature. Their claim to have known the work in its early stages is contrasted by the recollections of yet another Vienna student, Teodor V. Ștefanelli. He writes: "Eminescu never shared with anyone what he was writing on, and if he had written something he would not even show it to his roommates, but locked away his manuscript. Hence, we got to know of Poor Dionis and all his poetry [of the period] only in their printed form."

Eminescu made a trip back to the country and, on September 1, 1872, read the story to his patrons at Junimea—his "first-ever personal contact" with that literary club. The Junimea literati gave Poor Dionis a lukewarm reception. As recorded by the society's official diary, Junimist doyens Titu Maiorescu and Vasile Pogor both noted that "the ending and the resolution do not match into the whole structure". According to literary historian Alexandru Piru, such reactions were merely myopic: "The Junimists [...] did not notice that, at heart, with his use of fairy tale settings, Eminescu depicted the fate of the genius artist whom a hostile environment has condemned to a chimerical, deplorable, life." Maiorescu and Pogor eventually agreed to serialize Poor Dionis in the club's magazine, Convorbiri Literare, where the first episode appeared on December 1, 1872. Not discouraged by the reception, Eminescu responded with a subtle satire, meant to be read as an addendum to Poor Dionis: Cugetările Sărmanului Dionis ("Poor Dionis' Musings"). It was interwoven into the first installment of the story as published in Convorbiri Literare. According to scholar Dimitrie Vatamaniuc, it was also then that Eminescu added two paragraphs of prose and the Gautier quote, which were meant to clarify the work's philosophical intention.

One particularly virulent account of the Junimea reading survives in the memoirs of George Panu. Claiming to speak for the entire group, Panu recounted that the work read like "a philosophical aberration", "as weak as they get", without "at least the characteristics of a fantasy novella". Eminescu's biographers have dismissed Panu's claim as mystification. A lively opponent of Eminescu's national conservatism, Panu was not even in contact with Junimea when Poor Dionis was being presented for review. The same was claimed by the poet's nephew, Gheorghe Eminescu, who noted that Panu could not have been present at that meeting, and that his account is a "literary forgery, which is attributable to either bad faith or poor memory".

== Themes ==
Poor Dionis remains a pioneering work in the fantasy and Romantic-era sub-chapters of Romanian literature. Romanian scholar Zoe Dumitrescu-Bușulenga describes Eminescu's "grand novella" as "one of the most beautiful and most particular works of European Romanticism". Luisa Valmarin, the Italian philologist, calls Eminescu's work "the only philosophical novella produced by Romanian Romanticism". Among the scholars who regard the story as primarily a novel, Eugen Lovinescu also described Dionis as one of the first and most important protagonists of the genre, as it had developed in Romania. Reviewing Junimea's reaction, the same Lovinescu also noted that Poor Dionis carried with it a culture shock, exposing Romania to "Eminescu's hurricane of genius, bringing in all the elements of German sentimentality, filtered through a singular, personal, temperament."

The story signals some essential transitions in Eminescu's work. Luisa Valmarin writes that Eminescu stepped up from his early representations of the occult: in Strigoii, the theme reconstructs an ancient mythology; in Poor Dionis, occult symbols are borrowed for an actual escape into a magical universe. The move, she notes, "prefigures" Eminescu's poems. Somewhat different accounts are provided by scholars George Călinescu and Eugen Simion: the poem "Mirodonis", adapted from earlier Romanian folklore, seems to them a direct precursor of the Dionis narrative, especially when it comes to the poetic landscape. Researchers, beginning with Garabet Ibrăileanu, also describe Poor Dionis as a reprisal of Eminescu's "youthful novel", Geniu pustiu, from which it borrowed whole fragments.

=== Philosophical novel ===
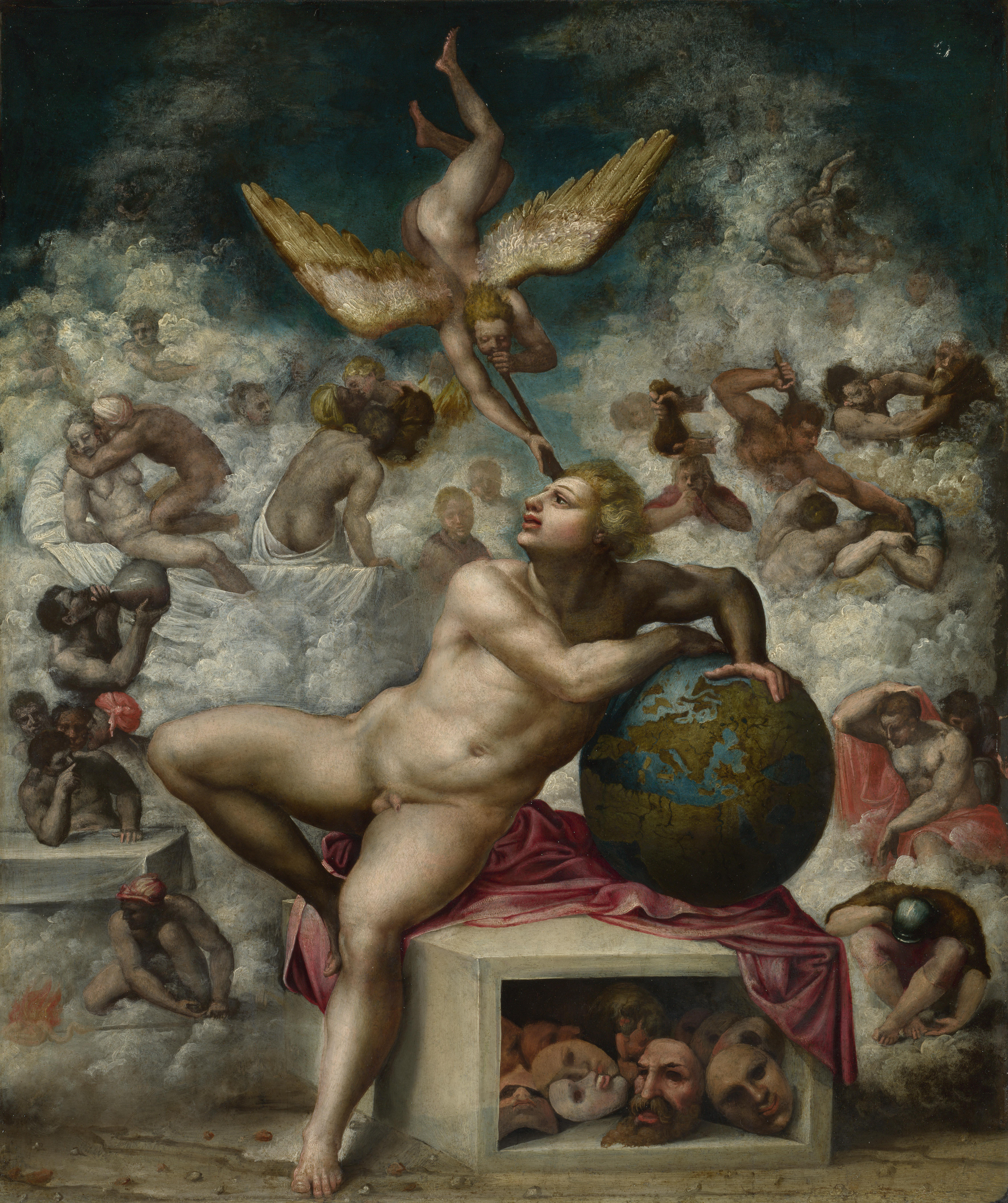
The Dream of Life, ca. 1533, by unknown Mannerist painter (attributed to Michelangelo)

Poor Dionis is rated by some exegetes (including Indian philologist Amita Bhose) as primarily a work of philosophical fiction. The historian and critic Nicolae Iorga merely saw the work as "illegible, were it not for the beauty of each passage". Any complex idea, Iorga argues, only spoke of Eminescu's fascination with philosophical tropes, and came out as "bizarre". Nae Ionescu, the controversial essayist and logician, also declared the work to be philosophically ambitious, but incoherent: "All the discouraging lack of logic that characterizes this short story stands as evidence in anyone's eyes that Eminescu was not a philosopher." In his view, Eminescu merely tried to give a literary representation to Kantianism, and imitate the Critique of Pure Reason. Philologist Alexandru Al. Philippide supposes that some "subtle philosophical undertones" might still exist in the account, but "when it comes to the artistic achievement, the fairy tale most definitely enjoys primacy." The same conclusion is drawn by his colleague Perpessicius, who notes that any Kantian overtones are submerged under "the prestige of the fairy tale." Constantin Noica took the work's ambitions more seriously, noting Eminescu's subtlety in rendering concepts that were new to Romanian philosophy, in particular his attempt to coin the term nefinire for "infinite divisibility".

Others suggest that the doubling of Dionis' being is not necessarily a purist philosophical commentary, and may in fact be tongue-in-cheek. Philosopher Horia-Roman Patapievici notes that, upon first reading the story as an adolescent, he traced its links with the views of Gottfried Leibniz and Immanuel Kant. Revisiting the project in 1996, he comments: "I am no wiser today as to whether this thought is mere idiocy or not". Dionis' detachment from his shadow may be a discreet self-mockery on Eminescu's part, as suggested by literary historians like Tudor Vianu and Vera Călin. They note that Eminescu follows to the letter a Romantic critique of the Kantian framework, wherein space and time are merely subjective realities. Likewise, critic Henric Sanielevici viewed the story as mainly a record of Dionis' break with positivism, his "pulling into the past by an invisible hand."

A trenchant point of view on the matter is expressed by G. Călinescu. Poor Dionis, he writes, is merely "a fantasy novella à la Théophile Gautier", and, for all of Eminescu's intertextual clues, the reification of Kantian concepts cannot function. According to G. Călinescu's verdicts, Kant did not view time as subjective, but rather as a subject of physical phenomena—Eminescu's interpretation comes from Kantian critics like Arthur Schopenhauer and J. Fichte. Whether Poor Dionis is Kantian or Schopenhauerian has been the topic of dispute among other critics—according to philosopher Angela Botez, this is mainly because Schopenhauer, who fascinated young Eminescu, borrowed and revolutionized some of the core Kantian ideas. "In truth", she notes, "from the philosophical musings that introduce the novella, and down to Dionis' metempsychosis, all this chaotic story is a powerful echo of Schopenhauerian philosophical categories." Shortly after Poor Dionis, Eminescu penned a dialogue, Archaeus, which ridiculed Kant's transcendental idealism, suggesting that even a gander could be better trusted to understand the world. According to Perpessicius, this piece is "tied to Poor Dionis by direct threads".

Various historiographers note that the concept of dreamed world precedes the German school by several generations, finding its literary expression in Calderón de la Barca's 1635 allegory, before arriving at Gautier. Eminescu's own perception of spacetime, as apparent in the story and in some poems (La steaua, for instance), has intrigued Romanian students of physics, particularly after they became aware of Albert Einstein's theory of relativity. In 1928, Einstein received a letter from his Romanian admirer, Melania Șerbu, who informed him that Poor Dionis had anticipated his finds; Einstein kept corresponding with Șerbu, but did not show an interest in reading the story. In addition to investigating such connections herself, critic Ioana Em. Petrescu believed that the modern interest of Poor Dionis, and of Eminescu's work in general, was given by its multiple levels, and especially by its hermeneutic suggestions. In her view, Zoroaster's book is a mirror of the world symbol, as in the deconstruction terminology coined by Jacques Derrida. Literary historian Constantin Ciopraga similarly notes that the fixation on Ruben's book of magic is a not to Hermetic concepts of the "world as a book".

The story's various folkloric reminiscences are in part introduced by Romantic localism. They reach down through Christian mythology, into apocrypha, heresy and Gnosticism. In the 1960s, academic Rosa del Conte proposed that the text alluded to Babylonian religion, Buddhism, Orphism, Mithraism, and Bogomilism. Philologist Anca Voicu also writes that the Gnostic source, a borrowing from the "fall of Sophia" myth (with some echoes from the Book of Proverbs and other orthodox writs), is Poor Dionis's very "narrative matter". The angels' description is picked up directly from the Apocalypse of Paul, while the moonscape replicates visions of paradise found in ancestral Romanian stories. Ruben's hybrid appearance also follows early Romanian ideas about the physical attributes of wisdom. The ideal of an unreachable but desirable lady, seen from below, is described by historian of culture Ioan P. Culianu as a nod in the direction of damsel in distress mythology.

Among the Eminescu scholars, Gheorghe Ceaușescu proposes that the novella, and in particular the Gautier quote, stand as evidence of Eminescu's Orientalism: "Eminescu was convinced of the Orient's superiority when confronted with the so-called progress in the West [...]. The Orient is the only place where the ancient knowledge survives." Bhose has pleaded for the work to be seen as one of Eminescu's Hindu-inspired contributions. She believes that, beyond adopting Kantian and Schopenhauerian discourse, Poor Dionis incorporates echoes from Vedanta philosophy and the Upanishads (known to have been read in translation by young Eminescu), even though, she asserts, the text does not follow such ideas to the letter. Bhose sees the novella as akin to the Advaita Vedanta, the metaphysical school of Adi Shankara. Shankara preached that all the selves in the cosmos are reflections of a formless divine presence. Also according to Bhose, concepts such as time perception and reincarnation came to Eminescu by way of Hindu philosophy. The reincarnation imagery and Eminescu's underlying belief in "the perishable outer layer of man and his undying soul" are also explored in the short story Avatarii faraonului Tlà, which invoked themes from Ancient Egyptian religion.

=== Romantic satire and proto-Symbolist work ===
Beyond its seeming cultivation of German philosophy, Poor Dionis is stylistically an homage to German Romanticism. It is most closely related to late-18th-century fantasy works by E. T. A. Hoffmann or Novalis. Among the Eminescu scholars, Perpessicius, Philippide, Simion and Ciopraga see a special connection between Dionis and Heinrich von Ofterdingen, the "Blue Flower" minstrel of Novalis' prose. In addition to this floral motif, Eminescu takes from Novalis the whole narrative device of dream sequences, and the uchronic worldview of "magical idealism". From Adelbert von Chamisso, the Romanian writer borrowed a "man without a shadow" motif that had already inspired him to write the 1869 short story "My Shadow". Eminescu's characterology is described by several authors as a nod in the direction of J. W. Goethe and his Faust, which also tells the story of an ill-adjusted savant reclaiming the universe.

Dumitrescu-Bușulenga proposes that Eminescu's Hoffmann-like Romanticism, with more distant echoes from Gothic fiction, takes on German philosophical concepts only as a literary device, while comparatist Matei Călinescu sees both Hoffmann and Eminescu as authors interested in the "absurd" side of fantasy. He argues that, in Poor Dionis, readers are slowly immersed into "a mellow chaos of signs", rather than confronted with sheer Gothic terror. As read by Botez, the resolution of Poor Dionis appears to be "mocking the readers" and their expectation of logical coherence. Following patterns found in Hoffmann and Jean Paul, this technique also announced developments in postmodern literature.

Cugetările, a rhyming companion to the novella, have thus been read as "typically Romantic" self-irony, "bohemian cynicism", or a "grave parody". According to Vera Călin, the addendum "wittingly paraphrases" Schopenhauerian philosophy, in the playful key of Tomcat Murr. The core stanzas are Eminescu's mock defense of an idle and imbecilic feline, who may be the dreamer of the world:

Filosof de-aș fi — simțirea-mi ar fi vecinic la 'aman!
În prelegeri populare idealele le apăr.
Și junimei generoase, domnișoarelor ce scapăr,
Le arăt că lumea vis e — un vis sarbăd — de motan.

Translation:

If I were an artful thinker, I would not eschew derision;
In a set of public lectures for ideals I'd boldly fight,
And I'd show the gen'rous youngsters, the young ladies gay and bright
That this world is merely dreamland and a cat's fantastic vision.
—translation by Leon Levițchi

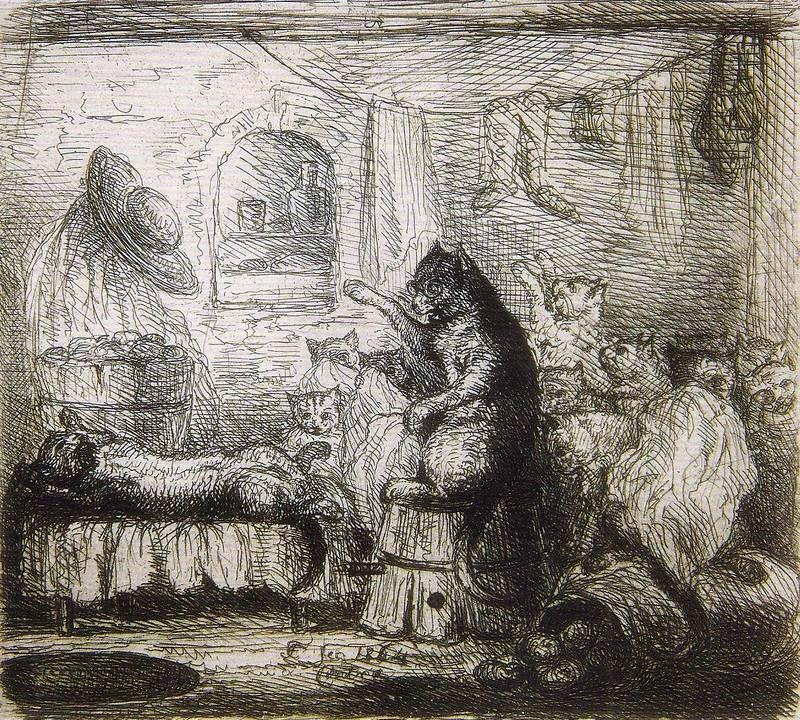
Tomcat Murr's death, 1864 etching by Ferdinand II of Portugal

The joke is on several poets cultivated by Junimea, who were entirely different in style and approach. Draft versions of the poem specify the main targets: Junimist poet-soldier Theodor Șerbănescu, and, beyond him, the "Young Germany" idol Heinrich Heine. In Cugetările, Eminescu introduces the derisive neologisms a heiniza, "to Heinefy", and motănime, "cat swarm", which alternate and contrast with words from the deeper layers of the Romanian lexis. Like some German theorists of the day, Eminescu was convinced that "gen'rous youngsters" everywhere had made it their mission to destroy civilization, referring to them as "idiots" with "rotten bodies"; as noted by scholar Ioana Pârvulescu, Dionis is ostensibly a poet by vocation, capable of putting together accomplished verse on a dare. The Cugetările addendum, Simion believes, explains that Poor Dionis should not be read as a passive and contemplative scenario: "The image of the world as the insipid dream of a tomcat seems a daring minimization of philosophical concepts, curiously so in a spirit such as Eminescu's, that is so very attracted to speculative matters. However, once we hold everything up to the poet's polemical intent, his parody of meditation and mockery of cosmogonic representations reveal their true significance."

As a lamentation of the poet's marginality in modern society, the poetry fragment is, according to writer and academic Mihai Zamfir, merely a "Romantic cliché". In his depiction of Dionis' lodging, particularly so for Cugetările, Eminescu may have been inspired by prints made after Carl Spitzweg's canvass, The Poor Painter. Historian of ideas Ana-Stanca Tăbărași suggests that Spitzweg's declining Biedermeier atmosphere was localized by Eminescu, treated with ironic detachment, and completed by intertextual allusions to another German motif: Komm, süßer Tod, for Cugetările's conclusive "come, oh, sleep or come, oh death". Scholar Virgil Nemoianu also sees the story as quintessentially "Biedermeier", wrapped up in "tamed" or "high" Romanticism.

Various commentators have revised the casual readings of the story as a late-Romantic joke, while also rejecting its interpretation in purely philosophical terms. According to scholar Ilina Gregori, the realistic and dream-like levels of Poor Dionis should never be separated. According to Gregori, the work as a whole is an "oneiric manifesto", an attack on the very conventions of literary realism. Similarly, writer Eugen Cadaru proposes that Poor Dionis is a Romanian contribution to magic realism.

Poor Dionis is central to another debate, which focuses on Eminescu's status as a late Romantic, versus his possibly role as a forerunner of Symbolism. Eminescu's story was lauded by poet and critic Benjamin Fondane, a prominent figure in Romania's own Symbolist circle (ca. 1915). Fondane regarded Poor Dionis as an actual Symbolist masterpiece, his terminology also listing Novalis among the Symbolists. The same notion was entertained by N. Davidescu, the Symbolist propagandist, who in 1939 described Eminescu as Romania's first Symbolist. Davidescu's claim was rejected by Lovinescu, who insisted that Eminescu and Poor Dionis only appeared Symbolist because of a substantial debt to Kantianism. The Symbolist connection was revisited in 2008 by researcher Rodica Marian, who sees Poor Dionis as compatible with Bruges-la-Morte, by Georges Rodenbach. She identifies both works as prose poems.

=== Memoir and political statement ===
In various critical interpretations of the novella, special note is made about the possibility that Dionis is the writer's alter ego. The story never reveals whether Dionis or Dan is the actual protagonist—according to Pârvulescu, the solution is "so very simple that everyone misses it by a long shot: the 'real' hero of these episodes is the poet, no matter what pseudonym he uses, and his dream [...] is the poem". As noted by Ciopraga, "Dionis is, without a doubt, a double of a very young Eminescu, who, in sketching the character's fictional profile, sketches out—to a certain degree at least—his own autobiography." Early on, Eminescu admirers were especially prone to arriving at this conclusion. Eminescian poet Alexandru Vlahuță notes that he imagined Eminescu to be a sort of sleepwalking Dionis, and that, to his surprise, his idol was rather "a stout and round-faced, aging, man, short-haired and dressed like any other". In 1930, however, Victor Morariu extended the Dionis comparison to describe the real-life Eminescu as a case of social failure.

Among the early reviewers, G. D. Pencioiu took a radical socially deterministic stand, proposing that Poor Dionis and its Schopenhauerian content were the product of frustration with, and withdrawal from, "bourgeois society". To some degree, the notion resurfaces in other biographically-inclined scholars. Iorga believed that the work was not only generically autobiographical, but also an actual record of Eminescu's various cultural immersions, including his destitute career as a prompter in Bucharest and Giurgiu, his enduring affection for Iași, and his scholarly interest in magic. According to researcher Vasile Bînzar, descriptions of Dionis' destitution closely resemble Eminescu's clerking for Botoșani tribunal in the 1860s. Resisting the posthumous glorification of Eminescu, Lovinescu also suggests that, like his protagonist, Eminescu lived his final decades in abject squalor. More generally, Sanielevici described Poor Dionis as a record of youth, "with its illusions, its sweet sorrow, its mirage of love eternal and fairy-tale life"; "readers will feel [...] like they co-wrote [it]". Knowing that Eminescu died as a mental ward patient, some have argued that the travel episodes are records of a developing schizophrenia.

Much discussion surrounds the topography of Eminescu's apocalyptic landscape. G. Călinescu makes a special mention of the fact that, although he follows the Romantic cult of ruins and decrepitude, Eminescu does not use its conventions to deplore decadence: "Quite the contrary, Eminescu rejoices." The episode where Dionis-Dan reshapes his universe also strikes a personal note: Dumitrescu-Bușulenga sees here a "last echo" of Eminescu's youthful belief in his own creative powers, crowning his idealization of the Romantic artist as a Luciferic monster. The same characteristic is noted by Ioana Em. Popescu, according to whom Dionis is the expression of immeasurable ambition, a "Catilinary" figure. As read by Pompiliu Constantinescu, Eminescu is primarily dominated by his Eros, and in Poor Dionis he depicts himself as the erotic daimon. The story's tragic note, he concludes, is in the daimon's subordination to the demiurge: unrequited love, followed by withdrawal into creativity. In his own essay on Eminescu's sexuality, I. P. Culianu postulates that "Poor Dionis overflows with self-confessions, aspirations and romanesque ideals": Dionis' unrequited love is the author's own "voyeur" self, idealizing his transformation into a "desirable suitor".

To some degree, this transfiguration also appears in Eminescu's treatment of other settings and landscapes. The Bucharest of Eminescu's imagination is not just affected by magic, but also suffering from "topographic incoherence" (an expression used by Eminescu expert Ioana Both). Likewise, Ruben's presence in early medieval Moldavia, where he is employed by a not-yet-existing Socola Academy, is highlighted by Simion as "an evident anachronism". In his hostile account, George Panu highlights the issues posed by Eminescu's belief in pristine simplicity: "Searching for that old Romanian type, Eminescu had taken his hero, Poor Dionis, down to the age of Alexander the Good, and wishing to confront us with old homes, wide verandas and ancient customs, he resorted to inventing them."

Such uchronic indifference has political implications: at the core, Poor Dionis is one of several texts by Eminescu where medievalism takes the center stage, highlighting his conservative vision of history. Panu's view was embraced and nuanced by later exegetes. Historian Alex Drace-Francis notes that Eminescu's work follows the trend of Romanian nationalism, mystifying the historical past and "inventing" tradition: "The novella [...] was just one of the forms in which Eminescu displayed his ability to weld the magical logic of the traditional fairy tale with a remarkably modern historical logic of national destiny [...]. Such fictions were a substantive advance in the imagining of continuity, placed on a new psychological plane." Author Mihai Cimpoi also notes that: "In Eminescu's palingenetic vision [...] the Middle Ages are a golden age, the object of all idealized projections."

A political focus is apparent in Eminescu's treatment of the Jewish character, who is a familiar outsider in both the medieval and modern settings. Cultural anthropologist Andrei Oișteanu proposes that, on its own, Ruben the Jew may embody a positive stereotype, that of the "wise rabbi", which has some deep roots in Romanian folklore. The oblique references to Ruben's Sephardi background and his refusal to convert may show that Eminescu regarded the 1492 Expulsion as a collective tragedy. The episode was cited by scholar Petru Zugun as evidence that Eminescu was not a xenophobe, as has been argued by other historians. Overall, however, Eminescu had an ambiguous attitude toward the Jews, veering between entirely positive characterizations and antisemitic outbursts. Ioana Both sees a connection between the apocalyptic nightmare of a city haunted by demons, on one hand, and, on the other, Eminescu's political articles, which proclaim that Romania was being invaded by foreigners.

== Influence ==
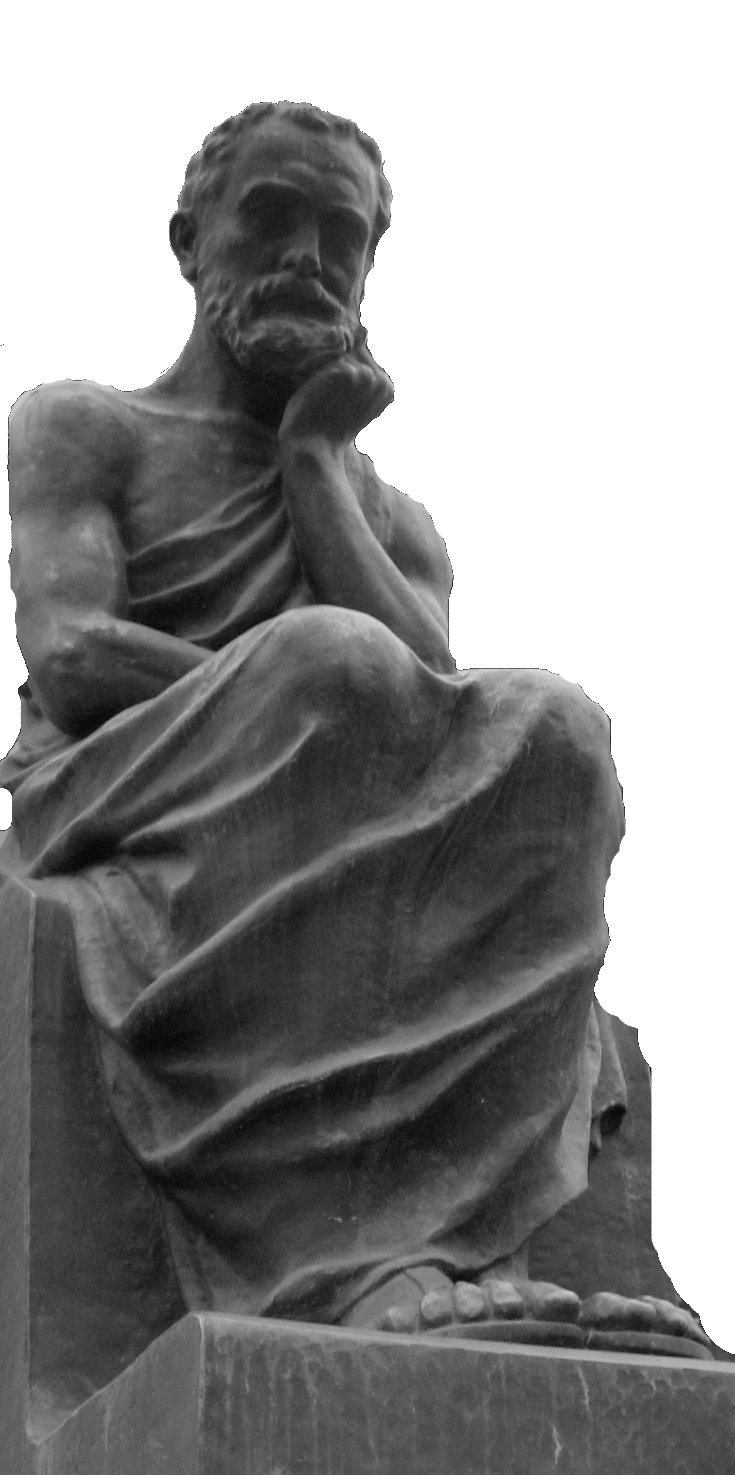
Ion Schmidt-Faur's "Philosopher", commonly seen as a representation of Dionis

Even before being recovered by the Symbolists, Poor Dionis was emulated by Ioan Slavici. Later in the 1870s, Slavici intended to write a spin-off, one based on Platonism rather than German ideologies. In 1890, one year after its author had died, Poor Dionis was featured in an Eminescu anthology compiled by Vasile Morțun, and reappeared in the 1914 Complete Works, put out by A. C. Cuza. It was only during that interval that the first critical commentary, penned by Nicolae Iorga, appeared in George Panu's Lupta; in 1906, Panu also contributed notes which restated his criticism of the work as "insane", but also included some words of praise. In addition to Fondane and Davidescu, other Romanian Symbolists were enthusiastic about Eminescu's creation. They include the poet Gheorghe Orleanu (1873–1908), who, together with Eugeniu Botez and Constantin Calmuski, rewrote the story into a five-act Symbolist play. It was performed only once, in June 1909, for the Eminescu festival in Galați, and is mainly noted for merging poems by Eminescu and Veronica Micle into the dramatic format. Similar adaptations were penned by the actor State Dragomir and by Dragomir's pupil, Nicolae Beligan.

The story is also commonly believed to have inspired the "Philosopher" sculpture, completed by Ion Schmidt-Faur in the 1920s as part of the Eminescu monument in Iași; the work may also be a Schmidt-Faur self-portrait. Overall, Poor Dionis and all other prose works by Eminescu were only marginally relevant to students of Eminescu, well into the interwar period. By then, however, the story had drawn attention from the Carlo Tagliavini, who published commentary on it for an Italian reading public (1923). It also remained a favorite of novelist Liviu Rebreanu, who, in 1940, described Poor Dionis as one of the top ten Romanian novellas.

The spread of modernist literature, and its growth into Romanian Trăirism (a cultivation of the immediate experience), generalized interest in Eminescu's fantasy prose. Although the work had been censured by their mentor, Nae Ionescu, Trăirists revived the Dionisian misunderstood hero; early study cases include Constantin Fântâneru's Interior (1932). Ion Biberi, who reportedly knew the story "almost by heart", may have been inspired by it and other Eminescu fantasy works in his contribution as a novelist. Originally impressed by Poor Dionis, Ionescu's disciple, Mircea Eliade, also introduced references to the story in his 1936 novel, Domnișoara Christina, and borrowed themes from it in the novella "Nights at Serampore". An essay he published in June 1939 defended Eminescu as a fantasy author, defining his Junimea critics as "gilded mediocrities" (mediocri scăpărători).

Upon rereading the story during World War II, Eliade declared himself: "less enthused than previously. In places, Eminescu's language is viscous, artificial; cacophonies abound." Physician Constantin Colonaș authored another play based on Eminescu's text, which was considered for staging by the National Theater Bucharest in 1941. During the same interval, the Romanian film industry, supervised by state-appointed managers Nichifor Crainic and Ion Filotti Cantacuzino, turned its attention to Eminescu's novella. Poet Dan Botta took it upon himself to write a Poor Dionis screenplay, which saw print in Familia and received good reviews. This project was ultimately cut short by the turn of tides on the Eastern Front. As argued in 1975 by critic Emil Manu, it could have resulted in a "grandiose film", capturing "Eminescu from the inside".

Under the Romanian communist regime, Poor Dionis and Cugetările were standards of the state curriculum, with the accent falling on the plight of misunderstood geniuses living in squalor. As Mihai Zamfir notes, this approach tended to favor "fragments of rough drafts" over the published version. In 1969, actor Emil Botta (brother of the poet-screenwriter) recorded his rendition of Cugetările, re-released in 2011; the entire story was read by another actor, Ion Caramitru, in a live broadcast on Romanian Television, which was aired before 1973. Early that year, the state broadcasting company marked Eminescu's 123rd birthday with a radio play, adapted by Biberi from the novella. During the 1970s and '80s, Poor Dionis was the topic of disputes between critics Vladimir Streinu and Mihai Drăgan—the former proposed a reading of Eminescu's evolution as a writer, which excluded the novella. Interest in Eminescu's prose was also kept alive among the Romanians of the Moldavian SSR, where, in 1979, Gheorghe Vrabie published his illustrations for the story.

In 1984, Maia Belciu published Dionys sărmanu, a novel with intertextual references to the 1872 narrative. Four years later, filmmaker Cătălina Buzoianu published another project for a Dionis screenplay. Before the fall of communism, Poor Dionis was also being recovered by Romania's modernist and late-modernist (Optzeciști) authors, who revived fantasy prose, and then by the postmodernists. The 1996 installment of Blinding, by Cărtărescu, makes cult or tongue-in-cheek references to Eminescu's story, as does Florina Ilis' 2012 biographical novel, Viețile paralele. Under post-communism, Eminescu's story remained outside the national curriculum, although Cugetările was included as optional reading material in some high-school textbooks. It was also the opening work in Șerban Foarță's anthology of "feline poetry", published 2008. Likewise, Eminescu's discourse about relativity, like its possible kinship with the theory of relativity, has since continued to stimulate Romanian critics and scientists. Writing in 2006, mathematician and essayist Solomon Marcus suggested that "such mentions have usually been compromised by exaggerations that would turn the poet into a precursor (if not indeed a coauthor) of the theory of relativity. Thankfully, more serious approaches have since followed".

In 1904, Bukarester Tagblatt published a translation of Poor Dionis into German, penned by W. Majerczik and Henric Sanielevici. This was followed ten years later by M. Schroff's version. Even after discarding Symbolism for Jewish existentialism, Fondane was an avid reader of Poor Dionis. By 1929, he had taken the initiative of translating the story into his adoptive French, without ever managing to finish that work. Although Cugetările was rendered into French by both S. Pavès (1945) and Veturia Drăgănescu-Vericeanu (1974), full French versions of Poor Dionis were only published in 1979, by Annie Bentoiu, and 1993 (as part of the Actes Sud collection) by Michel Wattremez. Several English translations were done by Sylvia Pankhurst, with a definitive version only published in 1979 by the Romanian Review. Poor Dionis was the first Eminescu work to appear in Serbian, in a version done by Lepoša Pavlič (1940); Zoltán Franyó published his rendition (the first one in Hungarian) in 1955, while a Russian translation appeared at Chișinău in 1980. The entire corpus of Eminescu's prose works was rendered into Chinese by Feng Zhichen, of the Beijing Foreign Studies University. Its first edition came out in 2003.
