= Dan Botta =

Romanian poet and essayist

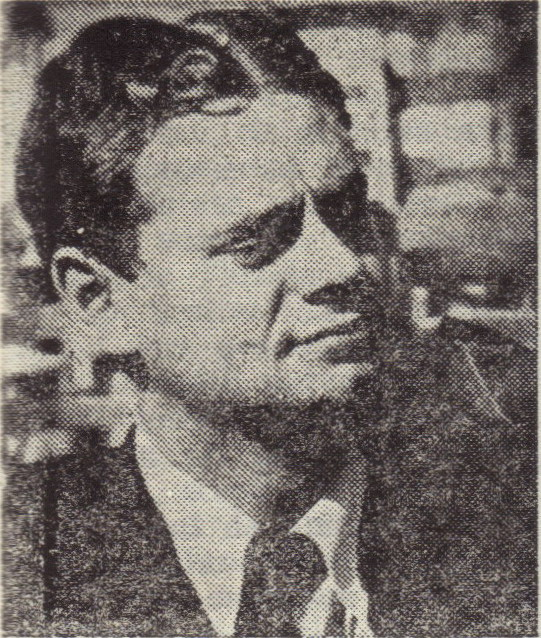
- Writer Dan Botta
- Born: 26 September 1907; Adjud, Putna County, Kingdom of Romania
- Died: 13 January 1958 (aged 50); Bucharest, Romanian People's Republic
- Education: University of Bucharest
- Occupations: Poet and essayist
- Parents: Theodor Botta (father); Aglaia Botta, née de Franceschi (mother)
- Relatives: Emil Botta

Dan Botta (Romanian pronunciation: [ˈdan ˈbota]; September 26, 1907 – January 13, 1958) was a Romanian poet and essayist.

== Life ==
Born in Adjud, his parents were the physician Theodor Botta and his wife Aglaia (née de Franceschi), an orphanage director; his brother was poet and actor Emil Botta. His father was descended from an old Transylvanian family, the noble status of which was confirmed by Christopher Báthory in 1579, and related to Bishop Ioan Bob. Theodor Botta, caught in the national struggle of Transylvania's Romanians during the rule of Austria-Hungary, took refuge in the Moldavia region of the Romanian Old Kingdom after completing his medical studies at Vienna. A doctor for the Căile Ferate Române state railway, he took part in World War I and died in 1921. Aglaia was the daughter of Francesco Maria de Franceschi, a Corsican who settled in Moldavia in 1872 and worked as a technician at the Sascut sugar factory.

Botta attended primary school in his native town, followed by high school in Focșani (Unirea High School until 1921) and Bucharest (Saint Sava National College, 1921–1923). He attended the University of Bucharest from 1923 to 1927, studying Latin and Greek literature and law. In 1927, he also completed studies at the physical education institute, perhaps reflecting a nostalgia for paideia. While a student, he contributed to Calendarul and L'Indépendance Roumaine magazines, publishing articles about literature, art and music. He later wrote for Rampa, Gândirea, Vremea and La Nation Roumaine; in 1941, together with Emil Giurgiuca and Octavian Codru Tăslăuanu, he founded Dacia magazine. He took part in the Criterion group's symposiums, joining the editing committee in 1943. From 1938, he formed part of the leadership at Dimitrie Gusti's project Enciclopedia României. In January 1939, Botta joined King Carol II's National Renaissance Front, as part of a mass recruitment among Romanian Writers' Society members. At one point a member of the Iron Guard, he spent time in prison under the communist regime.

Botta's first book was the poetry volume Eulalii (1931, Romanian Writers' Union prize), the only one published during his lifetime. His other cycles, Rune, Epigrame, Cununa Ariadnei and Poem în curs, appeared posthumously in 1968. His verses are incantational and erudite, anti-Romantic out of principle, full of linguistic invention, in line with European and domestic purism. His essays, which deal with artistic creation in general and the philosophy of Romanian culture in particular, are also full of original ideas, employing a lyrical and imaginative style: Limite (1936, Romanian Writers' Union prize) and Charmion sau Despre muzică (1941). Botta authored the féerie plays Comedia fantasmelor, Alkestis, Deliana, Soarele și luna, and, in 1943, a stage adaptation of Mihai Eminescu's Poor Dionis. He published Balade și alte poeme, a translation of works by François Villon, in 1956. From 1944 until his death, he worked on a philological treatise dealing with the Thracian substrate in the Romanian language, Roma – Threicia.

== Death ==
He died in Bucharest in 1958.
