= Enciclopedia României =

- Author: Dimitrie Gusti
- Language: Romanian
- Subject: Romania
- Genre: specialized encyclopedia
- Publisher: București, Imprimeria Națională
- Publication date: 1938-1943
- Publication place: Romania
- Media type: Print
- Pages: +5,000
- OCLC: 9981534
- LC Class: DR205 E52

The Enciclopedia României is an encyclopedia published between 1938 and 1943. Only four of the projected six volumes were published.

Dimitrie Gusti planned the encyclopedia in three section in its proposed six volumes.

- The first two volumes covered political-administrative organization. Vol. 1 The State. Vol. 2 Counties and cities.
  - Volume 1 is entitled State and is dedicated to the history, geography, political system, legal system, administrative, religion, diplomacy of Romania
  - Volume 2 is entitled Romanian Country and concerns the administrative divisions of Romania.
- The second two volumes covered economics. Vol. 3 National economy. Vol. 4 Business and Economic Institute.
  - Volume 3 is entitled National Economy and follows a description of economic geography, the population, economic legislation and production.
  - Volume 4 is entitled The domestic economy. Circulation, distribution and consumption; themes included transportation, communications, domestic and foreign trade, units and securities, credit, public finances and consumption.
- The last two volumes were to cover culture. Vol. 5 National culture. Vol. 6 Cultural institutions and personalities.

The encyclopedia was edited by the Scientific Association under the patronage of His Majesty Carol II of Romania, work was coordinated by Professor Dimitrie Gusti. Contributors included Nicolae Iorga, Constantin Rădulescu-Motru, Virgil Madgearu, Constantin C. Giurescu, Mircea Vulcănescu, Dan Botta, Constantin Moisil sau Cezar Petrescu.

The work consists of more than 5,000 pages, 800 color plates, 800 maps, 6,000 photographs and drawings.

The encyclopedia was republished at the end of 2010, in the context of a project supported by University Petre Andrei.
