= Florina Ilis =

Romanian writer

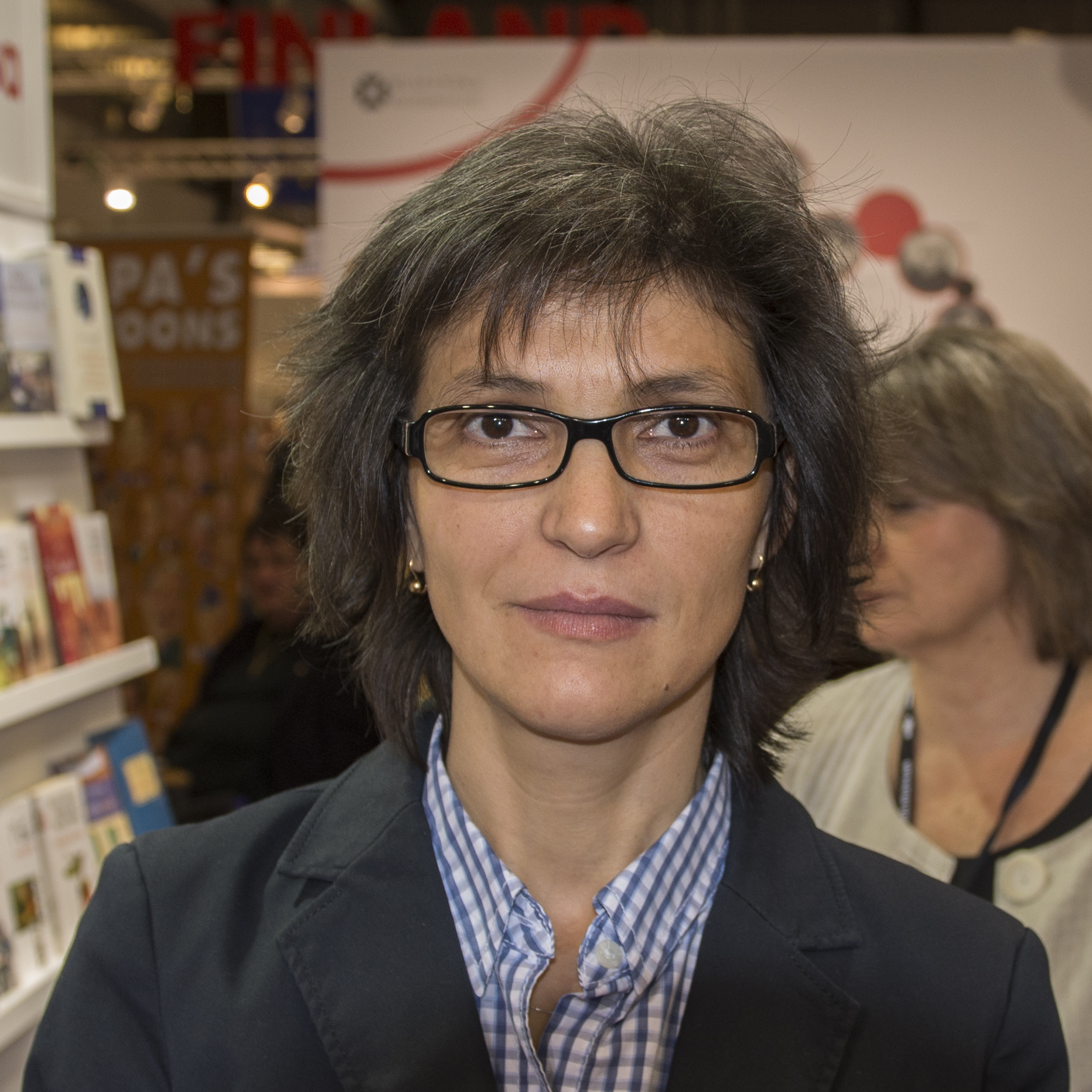
- Florina Ilis, Gothenburg Book Fair 2013.
- Born: 26 August 1968 (age 58)
- Occupation: Novelist
- Writing career
- Language: Romanian

Florina Ilis (born 1968) is a contemporary Romanian writer who has published haiku volumes and novels. As of March 2005 she is part of the Writers' Union of Romania.

== Works ==
- Haiku și caligrame (2000)
- Coborârea de pe cruce (2001)
- Chemarea lui Matei (2002)
- Cruciada copiilor (2005)
- Cinci nori colorați pe cerul de răsărit(2006)
- Lecția de aritmetică (Editura Echinox, 2006)
- Fenomenul science fiction în cultura postmodernă. Ficțiunea cyberpunk (Editura Argonaut, 2005)
- Viețile paralele, roman, București, Cartea Românească, 2012
