= Catalina de Salazar y Palacios =

Wife of Spanish writer Miguel de Cervantes (1565-1626)

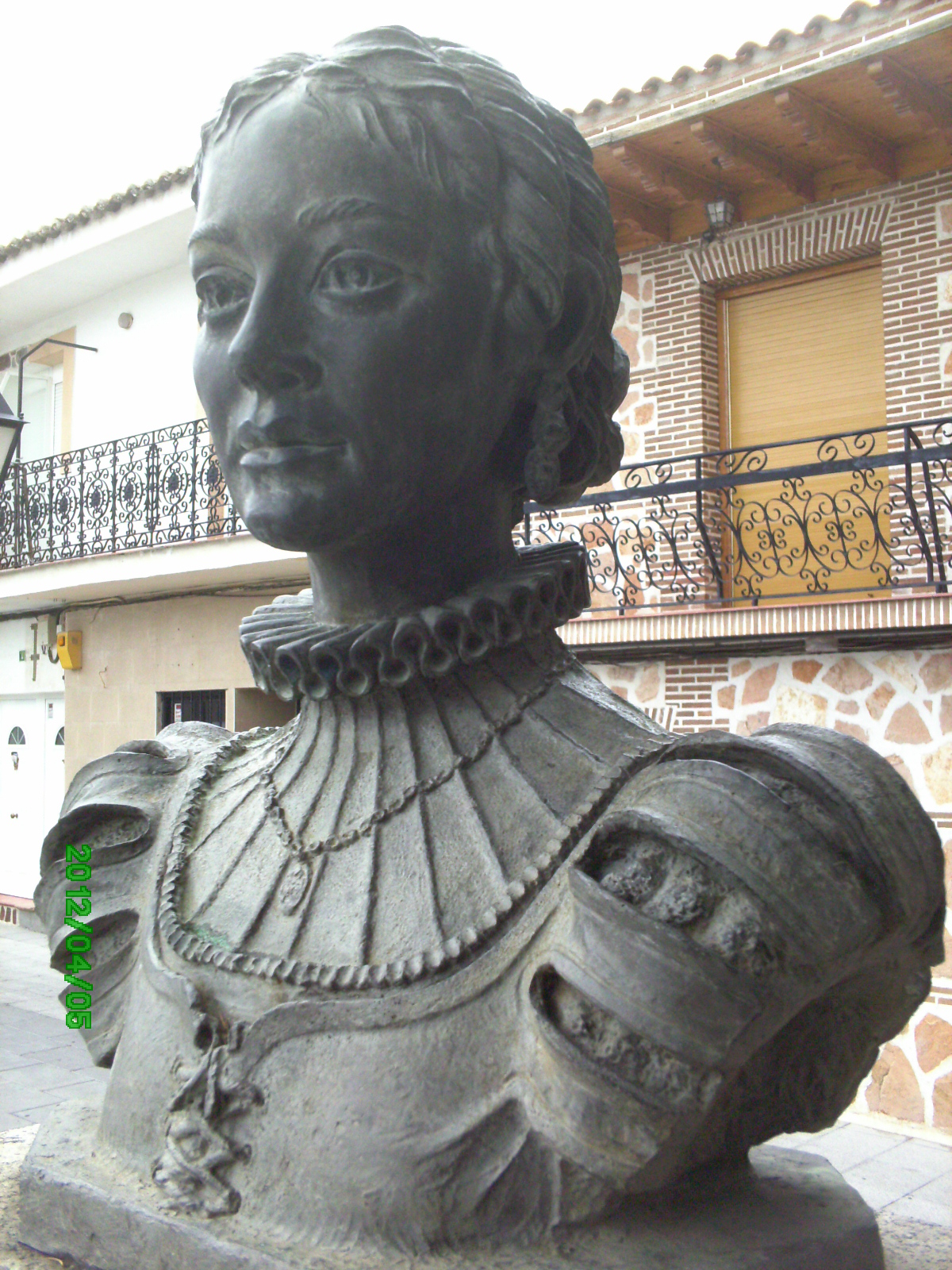
Catalina de Salazar y Palacios sculpture

Catalina de Salazar y Palacios (1565–1626) was the wife of the well-known Spanish writer Miguel de Cervantes.

== Life ==
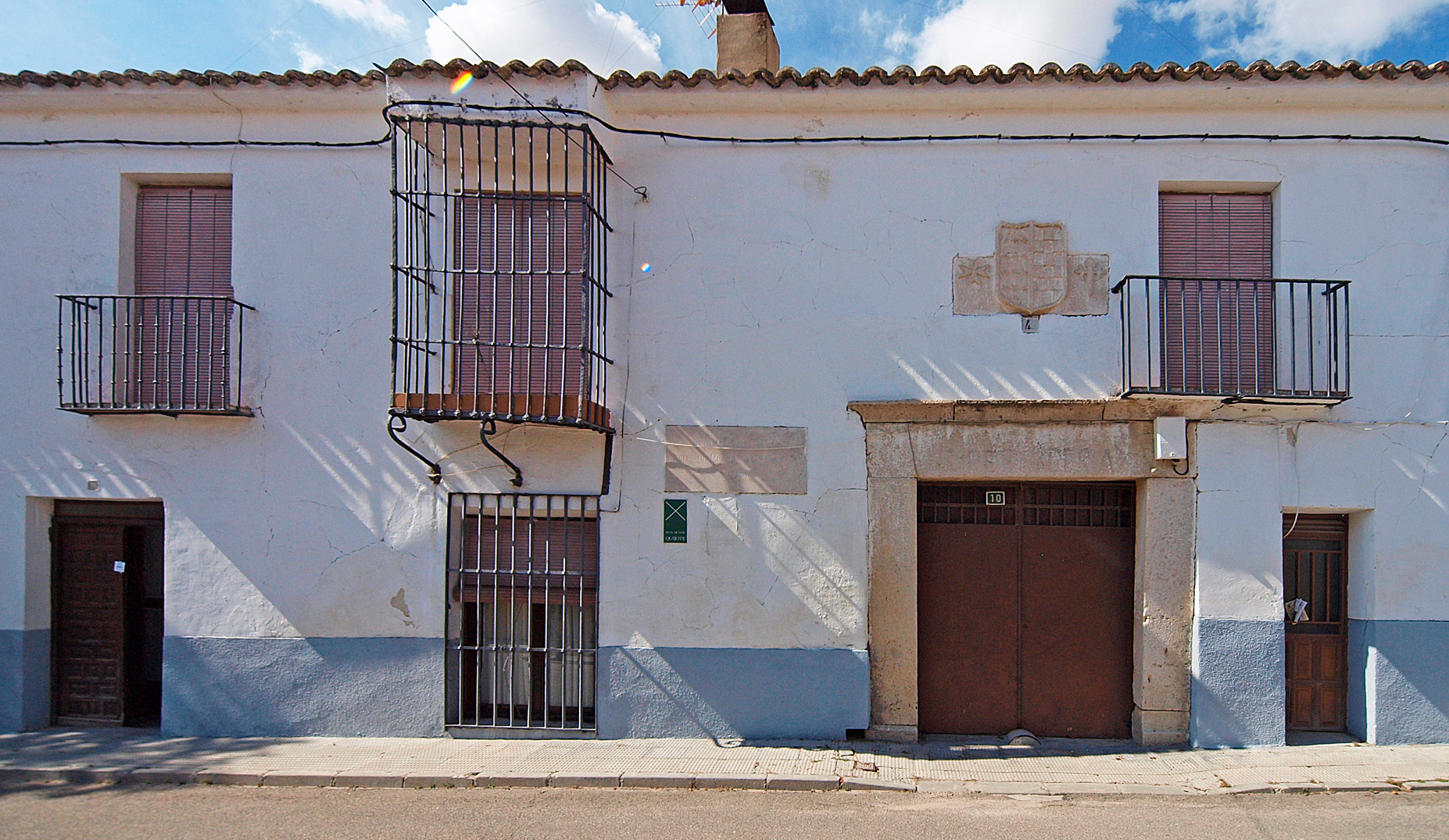
21st century photo of the birthplace of Catalina de Salazar y Palacios

She was born into a well known family in present-day Toledo. Her parents were Hernando de Salazar y Vozmediano and Catalina de Palacios. Record documents of her baptism show November 1565. In 1584, Catalina met Miguel de Cervantes when he travelled to Esquivias in connection with the papers of his deceased friend, the poet Pedro Laínez. They married on 12 December 1584 in the church of Esquivias. At the time, Catalina was about nineteen years old and Cervantes was thirty-seven. Despite being from a prominent family, she was not wealthy at the time of their marriage. Catalina and Cervantes had no children together.

After Cervantes's death in 1616, Catalina remained in Madrid. She made a second will on 20 October 1626 and died later that month, on 31 October, in Madrid. She was buried in the convent of the Trinitarias Descalzas, where Cervantes had also been buried. Based on the documents from that period, it seems likely that they had a successful marriage. Her surviving testament expresses her affection for Cervantes.

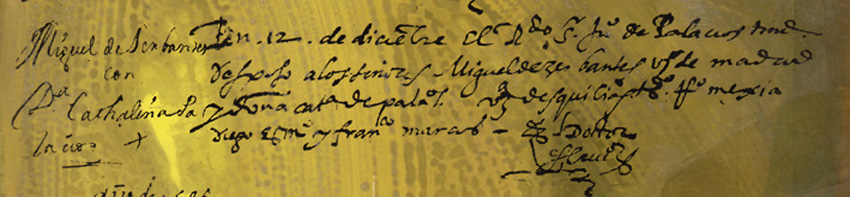
Documentation of the marriage with Cervantes
