= Convent of the Descalzas =

Convent of the Descalzas can refer to:

- Convent of Las Descalzas Reales, a royal monastery in Madrid
- Convent of the Barefoot Trinitarians, a monastery in Madrid
- Convento de Las Descalzas Reales, Valladolid, a monastery in Valladolid
- Convento de las Carmelitas Descalzas de San José, Toledo, a convent in Toledo
