= Miguel de Cervantes =

Spanish writer (1547–1616)

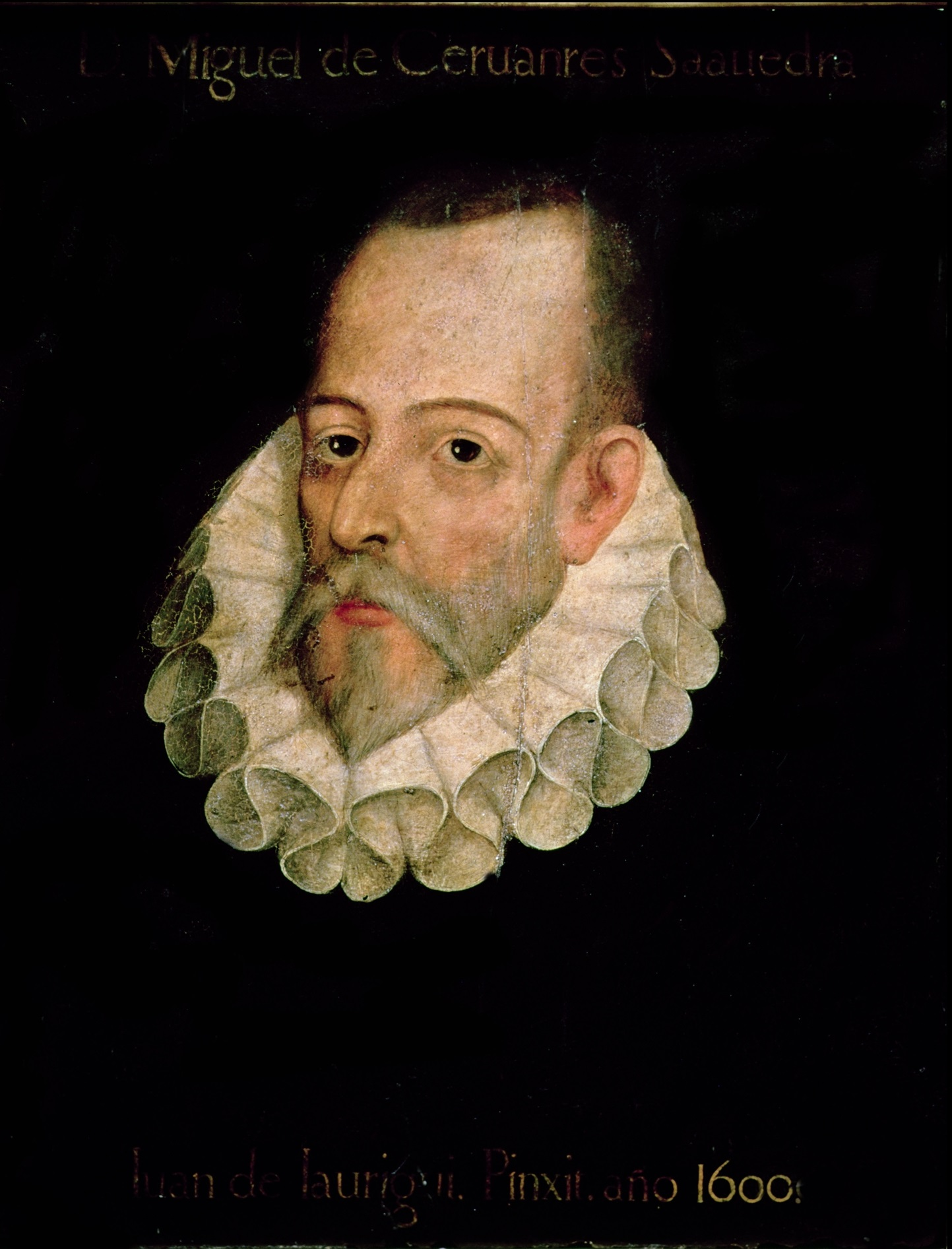
- This portrait, attributed to Juan de Jáuregui, (Note: Although Cervantes wrote in his preface to Exemplary Novels that Jáuregui did portrait: "el cual amigo bien pudiera, como es uso y costubre, grabarme y esculpirme en la primera hoja de este libro, pues le diera mi retrato el famoso D. Juan de Jauregui".) is unauthenticated. No authenticated image of Cervantes exists.
- Born: Miguel de Cervantes Saavedra; 29 September 1547; Alcalá de Henares, Spain
- Died: 22 April 1616 (aged 68); Madrid, Spain
- Resting place: Convent of the Barefoot Trinitarians, Madrid
- Occupations: Poet; playwright; novelist; soldier; tax collector; accountant
- Spouse: Catalina de Salazar y Palacios
- Children: 1 (illegitimate)
- Writing career
- Language: Early Modern Spanish
- Notable works: Don Quixote; Novelas ejemplares
- Movements: Renaissance literature, Mannerism, Baroque

Miguel de Cervantes Saavedra (/sɜːrˈvæntiːz, -tɪz/ sur-VAN-teez, -tiz; Spanish: [miˈɣel de θeɾˈβantes sa(.a)ˈβeðɾa]; 29 September 1547 (assumed) – 22 April 1616) was a Spanish writer widely regarded as the greatest writer in the Spanish language and one of the world's pre-eminent novelists. He is best known for his two-part novel Don Quixote, a work considered to be the first modern novel. Don Quixote has been labelled by many well-known authors as the "best book of all time" (Note: Milan Kundera, John le Carré, John Irving, Doris Lessing, Salman Rushdie, Miriam Lebwohl, Nadine Gordimer, Wole Soyinka, Seamus Heaney, Carlos Fuentes, Norman Mailer, and Astrid Lindgren were among the authors polled.) and the "best and most central work in world literature".

Much of his life was spent in relative poverty and obscurity, which led to many of his early works being lost. Despite this, his influence and literary contribution are reflected by the fact that Spanish is often referred to as "the language of Cervantes".

In 1569, Cervantes was forced to leave Spain and move to Rome, where he worked in the household of a cardinal. In 1570, he enlisted in a Spanish Navy infantry regiment, and was badly wounded at the Battle of Lepanto in October 1571 and lost the use of his left arm and hand. He served as a soldier until 1575, when he was captured by Barbary pirates; after five years in captivity, he was ransomed, and returned to Madrid.

His first significant novel, titled La Galatea, was published in 1585, but he continued to work as a purchasing agent, and later as a government tax collector. Part One of Don Quixote was published in 1605, and Part Two in 1615. Other works include the 12 Novelas ejemplares (Exemplary Novels); a long poem, the Viaje del Parnaso (Journey to Parnassus); and Ocho comedias y ocho entremeses (Eight Plays and Eight Interludes). The novel Los trabajos de Persiles y Sigismunda (The Travails of Persiles and Sigismunda), was published posthumously in 1617.

== Biography ==
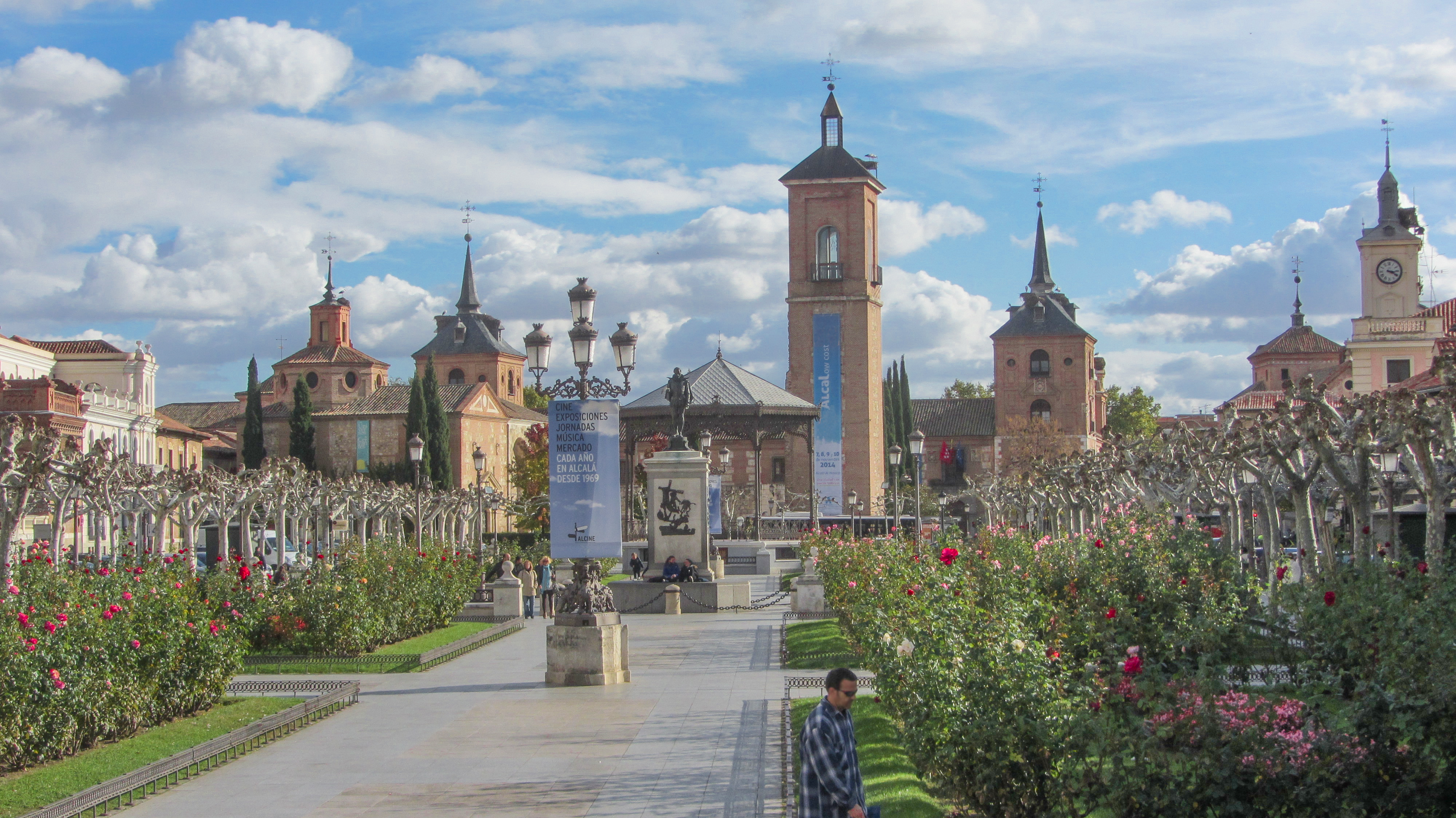
Santa María la Mayor, in Alcalá de Henares, where Cervantes was reputedly baptised; the square in front is named Plaza Cervantes

Despite his subsequent renown, many details of Cervantes's life remain uncertain, including his name, background, and physical appearance. He signed his name as "Cerbantes", but his printers used "Cervantes", which became the common form. In later life, Cervantes used "Saavedra", the name of a distant relative, rather than the more usual "Cortinas", after his mother. Historian Luce López-Baralt has suggested that "Saavedra" comes from the Arabic dialect word shaibedraa, meaning "one-handed", a reference to his nickname during his captivity. Further linguistic and historical evidence for this claim, however, remains debated.

Another area of dispute is Cervantes's ethnic background. It has been suggested that one or both of his parents may have been New Christians, that is, Catholics of Jewish ancestry. There is no wide following for the view that Cervantes had converso origins. The Cuban writer Roberto González Echevarría argues that the claims of Cervantes' converso origins are based on "very flimsy evidence", namely Cervantes' lack of social and financial progression which was not unusual for Spaniards of his time, regardless of their ancestry, as many did not receive these rewards during this period.

It is generally accepted Miguel de Cervantes was born around 29 September 1547, in Alcalá de Henares. He was the second son of barber-surgeon Rodrigo de Cervantes and his wife, Leonor de Cortinas (c. 1520–1593). Rodrigo came from Córdoba, Andalusia, where his father Juan de Cervantes was an influential lawyer.

=== 1547 to 1566: Early years ===
Rodrigo was frequently in debt, or searching for work, and moved constantly. Leonor came from Arganda del Rey, and died in October 1593, at the age of 73; surviving legal documents indicate she had seven children, could read and write, and was a resourceful individual with a keen eye for business. When Rodrigo was imprisoned for debt from October 1553 to April 1554, she supported the family on her own.

In his Novelas ejemplares, Cervantes claims to be a stutterer. Some authors believe it to be a figure of speech to describe himself as endowed with little verbal eloquence. Others, conversely, take it as a true speech impediment, citing similar commentaries made by Cervantes in three more of his writings aside from Novelas.

Cervantes's siblings were Andrés (born 1543), Andrea (born 1544), Luisa (born 1546), Rodrigo (born 1550), Magdalena (born 1554) and Juan. They lived in Córdoba until 1556, when his grandfather died. For reasons that are unclear, Rodrigo did not benefit from his will and the family disappears until 1564 when he filed a lawsuit in Seville.

Seville was then in the midst of an economic boom, and Rodrigo managed rented accommodation for his elder brother Andres, who was a junior magistrate. It is contended that Cervantes attended the Jesuit college in Seville, where one of the teachers was Jesuit playwright Pedro Pablo Acevedo, who moved there in 1561 from Córdoba. However, legal records show his father got into debt once more and in 1566 the family moved to Madrid.

=== 1566 to 1580: Military service and captivity ===
In the 19th century, a biographer discovered an arrest warrant for a Miguel de Cervantes, dated 15 September 1569, who was charged with wounding Antonio de Sigura in a duel. Although disputed at the time, largely on the grounds such behaviour was unworthy of so great an author, it is now accepted as the most likely reason for Cervantes leaving Madrid.

Cervantes eventually made his way to Rome, where he found a position in the household of Giulio Acquaviva, an Italian bishop who spent 1568 to 1569 in Madrid, and was appointed Cardinal in 1570. When the 1570 to 1573 Ottoman–Venetian War began, Spain formed part of the Holy League, a coalition formed to support the Venetian Republic. Possibly seeing an opportunity to have his arrest warrant rescinded, Cervantes went to Naples, then part of the Crown of Aragon. The military commander in Naples was Álvaro de Sande, a friend of the family, who gave him a commission in the Tercio of Sicily under the Marqués de Santa Cruz. At some point, he was joined in Naples by his younger brother Rodrigo.

In September 1571, Cervantes sailed on board the Marquesa, part of the Holy League fleet under Don John of Austria, illegitimate half brother of Phillip II of Spain; on 7 October, they defeated the Ottoman fleet at the Battle of Lepanto. According to his own account, although suffering from malaria, Cervantes was given command of a 12-man skiff, a small boat used for assaulting enemy galleys. The Marquesa lost 40 dead, and 120 wounded, including Cervantes, who received three separate wounds, two in the chest, and another that rendered his left arm useless. This last wound is the reason why he later was called "El manco de Lepanto" (English: "The one-handed man of Lepanto", "The one-armed man of Lepanto"), a title that followed him for the rest of his life. His actions at Lepanto were a source of pride to the end of his life, (Note: In the Preface to Volume 2 of Don Quixote, he writes "the loss of my hand (came about) on the grandest occasion the past or present has seen, or the future can hope to see. If my wounds have no beauty to the beholder's eye, they are, at least, honorable in the estimation of those who know where they were received".) while Don John approved no less than four separate pay increases for him.

In Journey to Parnassus, published two years before his death in 1616, Cervantes claimed to have "lost the movement of the left hand for the glory of the right". As with much else, the extent of his disability is unclear, the only source being Cervantes himself, while commentators cite his habitual tendency to praise himself. (Note: According to scholar Nicolás Marín: "No hay ocasión en que Cervantes no se elogie, bien que excusándose por salir de los límites de su natural modestia; tantas veces ocurre esto que no es posible verla nunca ni creer en ella". [There is no occasion in which Cervantes does not praise himself, even if he excuses himself for going beyond the limits of his natural modesty; this happens so many times that it is never possible to see it or believe in it].) However, they were serious enough to earn him six months in the Civic Hospital at Messina, Sicily.

Although he returned to service in July 1572 in the Tercio de Figueroa, records show his chest wounds were still not completely healed in February 1573. Based mainly in Naples, he joined expeditions to Corfu and Navarino, and took part in the 1573 occupation of Tunis and La Goulette, which were recaptured by the Ottomans in 1574. Despite Lepanto, the war overall was an Ottoman victory, and the loss of Tunis a military disaster for Spain. Cervantes returned to Palermo, where he was paid off by the Duke of Sessa, who gave him letters of commendation.

In early September 1575, Cervantes and Rodrigo left Naples on the galley Sol; as they approached Barcelona on 26 September, their ship was captured by Ottoman corsairs, and the brothers taken to Algiers, to be sold as slaves, or – as was the case of Cervantes and his brother – held for ransom, if this would be more lucrative than their sale as slaves. Rodrigo was ransomed in 1577, but his family could not afford the fee for Cervantes, who was forced to remain. Turkish historian Rasih Nuri İleri found evidence suggesting Cervantes worked on the construction of the Kılıç Ali Pasha Complex, which would mean he spent at least part of his captivity in Istanbul. This is yet to be proven and no evidence has been published on the matter.

By 1580, Spain was occupied with integrating Portugal, and suppressing the Dutch Revolt, while the Ottomans were at war with Persia; the two sides agreed to a truce, leading to an improvement of relations. After almost five years, and four escape attempts, in 1580 Cervantes was set free by the Trinitarians, a religious order that specialised in ransoming Christian captives, and returned to Madrid.

=== 1580 to 1616: Later life and death ===
While Cervantes was in captivity, both Don John and the Duke of Sessa died, depriving him of two potential patrons, while the Spanish economy was in dire straits. This made finding employment difficult; other than a period in 1581 to 1582, when he was employed as an intelligence agent in North Africa, little is known of his movements prior to 1584.

In April of that year, Cervantes visited Esquivias, to help arrange the affairs of his recently deceased friend and minor poet, Pedro Laínez. There he met Catalina de Salazar y Palacios (c. 1566 – 1626), eldest daughter of the widowed Catalina de Palacios; her husband died leaving only debts, but the elder Catalina owned some land of her own. This may be why in December 1584, Cervantes married her daughter, then between 15 and 18 years old. The first use of the name Cervantes Saavedra appears in 1586, on documents related to their marriage.

Shortly before this, his illegitimate daughter Isabel was born in November. Her mother, Ana Franca, was the wife of a Madrid innkeeper; they apparently concealed it from her husband, but Cervantes acknowledged paternity. When Ana Franca died in 1598, he asked his sister Magdalena to take care of his daughter.

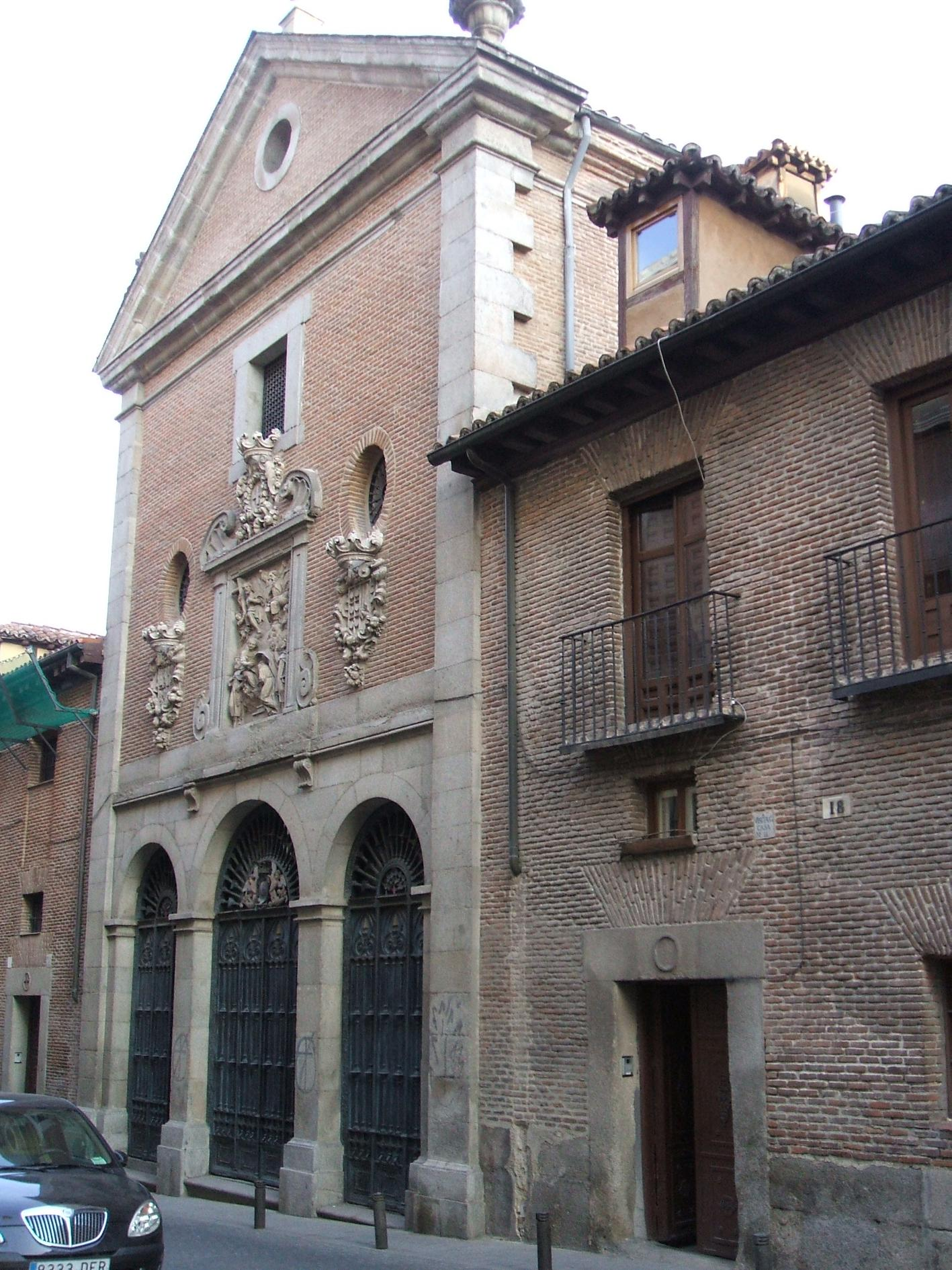
Cervantes was buried at the Convent of the Barefoot Trinitarians in Madrid.

In 1587, Cervantes was appointed as a government purchasing agent, Commissary of the Royal Galleons in Seville, obtaining wheat and oil for the doomed Spanish Armada. He became a tax collector in 1592 and was briefly jailed for "irregularities" in his accounts, but quickly released. Several applications for positions in Spanish America were rejected, e.g., to the Council of Indies in 1590, though modern critics note images of the colonies appear in his work.

From 1596 to 1600, he lived primarily in Seville, then returned to Madrid in 1606, where he remained for the rest of his life. In later years, he received some financial support from the Count of Lemos, although he was not included in the retinue Lemos took to Naples when appointed Viceroy in 1608. In July 1613, he joined the Third Order Franciscans, then a common way for Catholics to gain spiritual merit.

It is generally accepted Cervantes died on 22 April 1616 (NS; the Gregorian calendar had superseded the Julian in 1582 in Spain and some other countries). The date of 23 April 1616 was long considered his death date, but is now understood to be his date of burial. 23 April, which is also the death date of William Shakespeare (also in 1616, but not on the same day, as England then used the Julian calendar), is now celebrated as World Book Day.

The symptoms described leading to his death, including intense thirst, correspond to diabetes, then untreatable.

In accordance with his will, Cervantes was buried in the Convent of the Barefoot Trinitarians, in central Madrid, in memory of the Trinitarians who had paid his ransom in 1580. He was buried as a pauper and carried by members of the Third Order of Saint Francis. His remains went missing when moved during rebuilding work at the convent in 1673, and in 2014, historian Fernando de Prado launched a project to rediscover them.

In January 2015, Francisco Etxeberria, the forensic anthropologist leading the search, reported the discovery of caskets containing bone fragments, and part of a board, with the letters "M.C.". Based on evidence of injuries suffered at Lepanto, on 17 March 2015 they were confirmed as belonging to Cervantes along with his wife and others. They were formally reburied at a public ceremony in June 2015.

== Supposed likenesses ==
No authenticated portrait of Cervantes is known to exist. The one most often associated with the author is attributed to Juan de Jáuregui, but both names were added at a later date. The El Greco painting in the Museo del Prado, known as Retrato de un caballero desconocido (Portrait of an Unknown Gentleman), is cited as "possibly" depicting Cervantes, but there is no evidence for this. It has been suggested that the portrait The Nobleman with his Hand on his Chest, also by El Greco, may possibly depict Cervantes.

However, the Prado itself, while mentioning, in passing, that "specific names have been proposed for the sitter, including that of Cervantes", and even "that the painting could be a self-portrait [of El Greco]", goes on to state that "Without doubt, the most convincing suggestion has connected this figure with the Second Marquis of Montemayor, Juan de Silva y de Ribera, a contemporary of El Greco who was appointed military commander of the Alcázar in Toledo by Philip II and Chief Notary to the Crown, a position that would explain the solemn gesture of the hand, depicted in the act of taking an oath."

The portrait by Luis de Madrazo, at the Biblioteca Nacional de España, painted in 1859, was based on his imagination. The image that appears on Spanish euro coins of €0.10, €0.20 and €0.50 is based on a bust, created in 1905.

In 2025, the European Central Bank announced that Cervantes had been selected to appear on the obverse of fifty euro banknotes in a future redesign, were the theme "European culture" to be selected over "Rivers and birds".

== Literary career ==
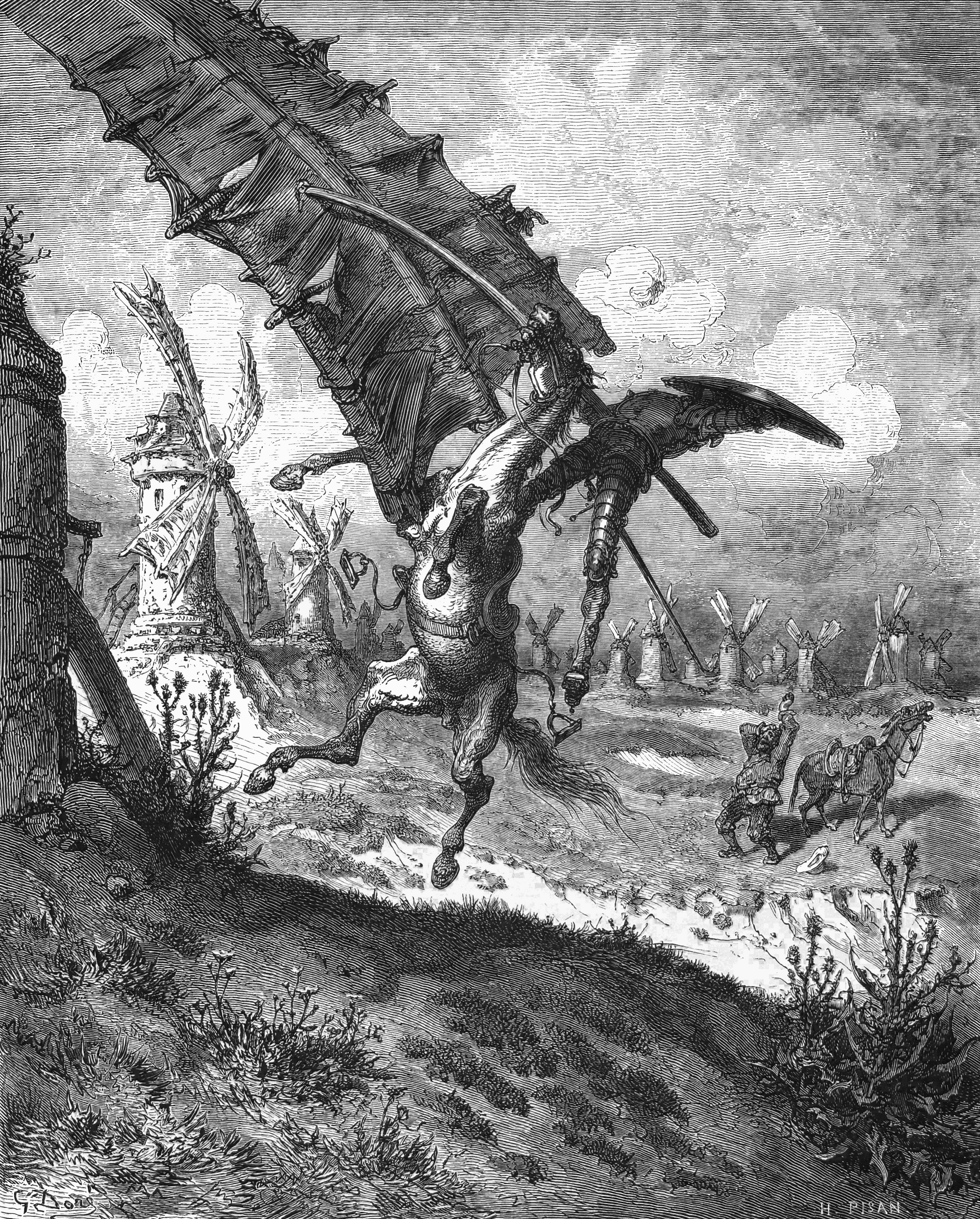
The windmill scene from Don Quijote, by Gustave Doré

Cervantes claimed to have written more than 20 plays, such as El trato de Argel, based on his experiences in captivity. Such works were extremely short-lived, and even Lope de Vega, the best-known playwright of the day, could not live on their proceeds. In 1585, he published La Galatea, a conventional pastoral romance that received little contemporary notice; despite promising to write a sequel, he never did so.

Aside from these, and some poems, by 1605, Cervantes had not been published for 20 years. In Don Quixote, first published in January 1605, he challenged a form of literature that had been a favourite for more than a century, explicitly stating his purpose was to undermine "vain and empty" chivalric romances. His portrayal of real life, and use of everyday speech in a literary context was considered innovative, and proved instantly popular. Don Quixote and Sancho Panza featured in masquerades held to celebrate the birth of Philip IV on 8 April 1605.

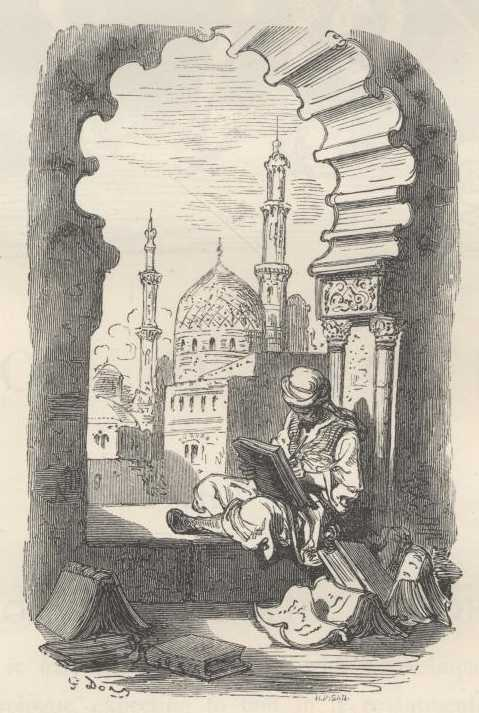
An illustration from Don Quijote, by Doré

Cervantes finally achieved a degree of financial security, while Don Quixote's popularity led to demands for a sequel. In the foreword to his 1613 work, Novelas ejemplares, dedicated to his patron, the Count of Lemos, Cervantes promises to produce one, but was pre-empted by an unauthorised version published in 1614, published under the name Alonso Fernández de Avellaneda. It is possible this delay was deliberate, to ensure support from his publisher and reading public; Cervantes finally produced the second part of Don Quixote in 1615.

The two parts of Don Quixote are different in focus, but similar in their clarity of prose and their realism. The first was more comic, and had greater popular appeal. The second part is often considered more sophisticated and complex, with a greater depth of characterisation and philosophical insight.

"In the space of a few pages, what started as an exercise in comic ridicule and, as the narrator insists on several occasions, a satirical send-up of the tales of chivalry, has taken on an entirely different dimension; it has begun to transform itself into the story of a relationship between two characters whose incompatible takes on the world are bridged by friendship, loyalty, and eventually love."

== Legacy ==
Cervantes was rediscovered by English writers in the mid-18th century. The literary editor John Bowle argued that Cervantes was as significant as any of the Greek and Roman authors then popular, and published an annotated edition in 1781. Now viewed as a significant work, at the time it proved a failure. However, Don Quixote has been translated into all major languages, in 700 editions. Mexican author Carlos Fuentes suggested that Cervantes and his contemporary William Shakespeare form part of a narrative tradition that includes Homer, Dante, Defoe, Dickens, Balzac, and Joyce.

Sigmund Freud claimed he learnt Spanish to read Cervantes in the original; he particularly admired The Dialogue of the Dogs (El coloquio de los perros), from Exemplary Tales, in which two dogs, Cipión and Berganza, share their stories; as one talks, the other listens, occasionally making comments. From 1871 to 1881, Freud and his close friend Eduard Silberstein wrote letters to each other, using the pen names Cipión and Berganza.

In 1905, the tricentennial of the publication of Don Quixote was marked with celebrations in Spain; the 400th anniversary of his death, in 2016, saw the production of Cervantina, a celebration of his plays by the Compañía Nacional de Teatro Clásico in Madrid. Man of La Mancha, the 1965 musical, was loosely based on Cervantes' life. The Miguel de Cervantes Virtual Library is the world's largest digital archive of Spanish-language historical and literary works.

Even into the end of the twentieth century, nearly four hundred years later, important authors in Spain— such as Rafael Morales— acknowledged Cervantes as their favorite writer.

The Cervantes Society of America was founded in 1978 and held its first membership meeting in San Francisco in December, 1979. The organization aims to further studies of Cervantes' works and his influence in American society.

The 2025 film The Captive, directed by Alejandro Amenábar and starring Julio Peña is a fictional portrayal of Cervantes during the 5 years of his imprisonment in Algiers. In the film, Cervantes develops his skills at story-telling, firstly as a way to entertain fellow prisoners, and then to gain the favor of the governor keeping him captive.

== Works ==
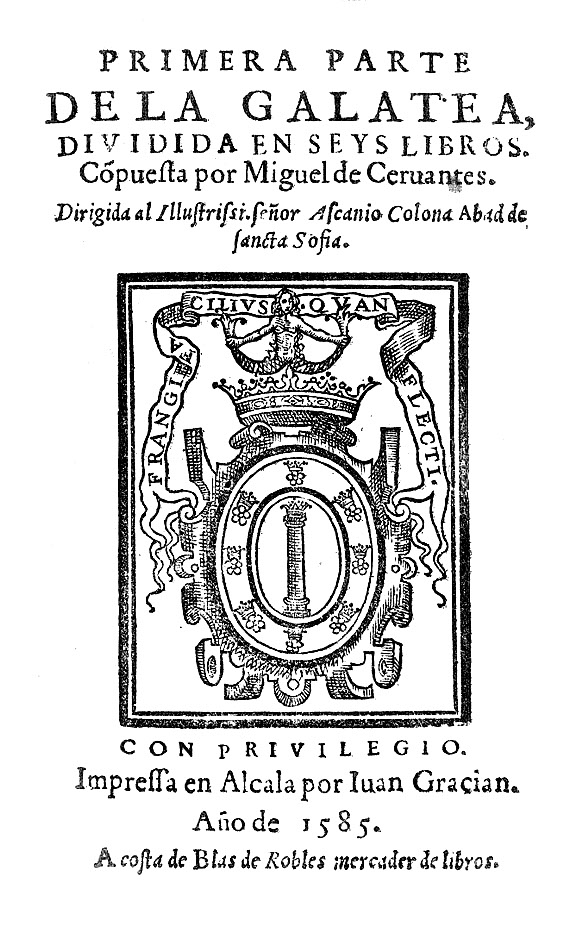
The original title page of Cervantes's La Galatea (1585)

As listed in Complete Works of Miguel de Cervantes:

- La Galatea (1585);
- El ingenioso hidalgo Don Quixote de la Mancha (1605): First volume of Don Quixote.
- Novelas ejemplares (1613): a collection of 12 short stories of varied types about the social, political, and historical problems of Cervantes's Spain:
  - "La gitanilla" ("The Gypsy Girl")
  - "El amante liberal" ("The Generous Lover")
  - "Rinconete y Cortadillo" ("Rinconete & Cortadillo")
  - "La española inglesa" ("The English Spanish Lady")
  - "El licenciado Vidriera" ("The Lawyer of Glass")
  - "La fuerza de la sangre" ("The Power of Blood")
  - "El celoso extremeño" ("The Jealous Man from Extremadura")
  - "La ilustre fregona" ("The Illustrious Kitchen-Maid")
  - "Novela de las dos doncellas" ("The Novel of the Two Damsels")
  - "Novela de la señora Cornelia" ("The Novel of Lady Cornelia")
  - "Novela del casamiento engañoso" ("The Novel of the Deceitful Marriage")
  - "El coloquio de los perros" ("The Dialogue of the Dogs")
- Segunda Parte del Ingenioso Cavallero [sic] Don Quixote de la Mancha (1615): Second volume of Don Quixote.
- Los trabajos de Persiles y Sigismunda (1617).

=== Other works ===
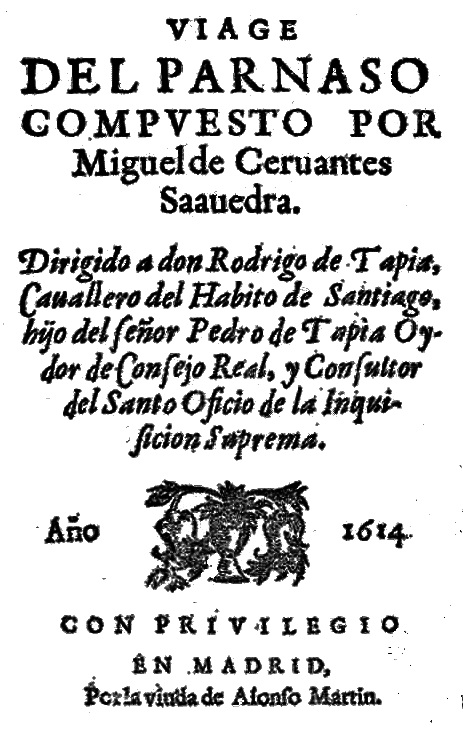
The frontispiece of the Viaje (1614)

Cervantes is generally considered a mediocre poet; few of his poems survive. Some appear in La Galatea, while he also wrote Dos Canciones à la Armada Invencible.

His sonnets include Al Túmulo del Rey Felipe en Sevilla, Canto de Calíope and Epístola a Mateo Vázquez. Viaje del Parnaso, or Journey to Parnassus, is his most ambitious verse work, an allegory that consists largely of reviews of contemporary poets.

He published a number of dramatic works, including ten extant full-length plays:

- Trato de Argel; based on his own experiences, deals with the life of Christian slaves in Algiers;
- La Numancia; intended as a patriotic work, dramatization of the long and brutal siege of Numantia, by Scipio Aemilianus, completing the transformation of the Iberian Peninsula into the Roman province Hispania, or España.
- El gallardo español,
- Los baños de Argel,
- La gran sultana, Doña Catalina de Oviedo,
- La casa de los celos,
- El laberinto de amor,
- La entretenida,
- El rufián dichoso,
- Pedro de Urdemalas, a sensitive play about a picaro, who joins a group of Gypsies for love of a girl.

He also wrote eight short farces (entremeses):

- El juez de los divorcios,
- El rufián viudo llamado Trampagos,
- La elección de los Alcaldes de Daganzo,
- La guarda cuidadosa (The Vigilant Sentinel),
- El vizcaíno fingido,
- El retablo de las maravillas,
- La cueva de Salamanca
- El viejo celoso (The Jealous Old Man).

These plays and short farces, except for Trato de Argel and La Numancia, made up Ocho Comedias y ocho entreméses nuevos, nunca representados (Eight Comedies and Eight New Interludes, Never Before Performed), which appeared in 1615. The dates and order of composition of Cervantes's short farces are unknown. Faithful to the spirit of Lope de Rueda, Cervantes endowed them with novelistic elements, such as simplified plot, the type of descriptions normally associated with a novel, and character development. Cervantes included some of his dramas among the works he was most satisfied with.

== Influence ==
=== Places ===
- Cervantes. A municipality in the province of Lugo, Galicia, Spain, but the name of the town is not based on Miguel de Cervantes (nor is there any evidence tying him or his family to this town).
- Cervantes. A municipality in the province of Ilocos Sur, Philippines.
- Cervantes. A township situated north of the Western Australian state capital Perth in Australia.

=== Television ===
- Cervantes is a recurring character in the Spanish television show El ministerio del tiempo, portrayed by actor Pere Ponce.
- Cervantes played a prominent role in the episode "Gentlemen of Spain" of the TV series Sir Francis Drake (1961–1962). He was portrayed by the actor Nigel Davenport and the plot had him heroically rescuing other Christian captives from the Barbary pirates.

== See also ==
- Casa de Cervantes
- Instituto Cervantes
- Miguel de Cervantes Prize
- Miguel de Cervantes European University
- Miguel de Cervantes Health Care Centre
- Miguel de Cervantes High School
- Miguel de Cervantes Memorial
- Miguel de Cervantes University

== Bibliography ==
- Byron, William (1978). Cervantes; A Biography. London: Cassell. ISBN 978-1-55778-006-5.
- Cascardi, Anthony J., ed. (17 October 2002). The Cambridge Companion to Cervantes. Cambridge University Press. ISBN 978-0-52166-387-8.
- Cervantes, Miguel de (2015) [1615]. The Ingenious Gentleman Don Quixote of La Mancha. Translated by Ormsby, John. Aegitas. ISBN 978-5-00064-159-0.
- Close, A. J. (2008). A Companion to Don Quixote. Boydell & Brewer Ltd. ISBN 978-1-85566-170-7.
- Davis, Paul K. (1999). 100 Decisive Battles: From Ancient Times to the Present. Oxford University Press. ISBN 978-0-19514-366-9.
- Egginton, William (2016). The Man Who Invented Fiction: How Cervantes Ushered in the Modern World. Bloomsbury. ISBN 978-1-62040-175-0.
- Eisenberg, Daniel (1996). "Cervantes, autor de la "Topografía e historia general de Argel" publicada por Diego de Haedo". Cervantes: Bulletin of the Cervantes Society of America. 16 (1): 32–53. doi:10.3138/Cervantes.16.1.032. S2CID 187065952.
- Fitzmaurice-Kelly, James (1892). The Life of Cervantes. Chapman Hall.
- Fuentes, Carlos (1988). Myself with Others: Selected Essays. Farrar Straus Giroux. ISBN 978-0-37421-750-1.
- Garcés, Maria Antonia (2002). Cervantes in Algiers: A Captive's Tale. Vanderbilt University Press. ISBN 978-0-82651-406-6.
- Glete, Jan (2001). War and the State in Early Modern Europe: Spain, the Dutch Republic and Sweden as Fiscal-Military States (Warfare and History). Routledge. ISBN 978-0-41522-644-8.
- Lokos, Ellen (2016). Cruz, Anne J; Johnson, Carroll B (eds.). The Politics of Identity and the Enigma of Cervantine Genealogy in Cervantes and His Postmodern Constituencies. Routledge. ISBN 978-1-13886-441-2.
- Lucía Megías, José Manuel (2015). La juventud de Cervantes: una vida en construcción. ISBN 978-84-414-3616-9.
- Ma, Ning (2017). The Age of Silver: The Rise of the Novel, East and West. OUP. ISBN 978-0-19060-656-5.
- McCrory, Donald P. (2006). No Ordinary Man: The Life and Times of Miguel de Cervantes. Dover Publishing. ISBN 978-0-48645-361-3.
- Mitsuo, Nakamura; Cullen, Jennifer (December 2006). "On 'Don Quixote'". Review of Japanese Culture and Society. 18 (East and West): 147–156. JSTOR 42800232.
- Parker, Barbara Keevil; Parker, Duane F. (2009). Miguel de Cervantes. Infobase Publishing. ISBN 978-1-43810-685-4.
- Putnam, Samuel (1976). Introduction to The Portable Cervantes. Harmondsworth: Penguin. ISBN 978-0-14015-057-5.
- Riley, E. C. (1994). "Cipión" Writes to "Berganza" in the Freudian Academia Española". Cervantes: Bulletin of the Cervantes Society of America. 14 (1): 3–18. doi:10.3138/cervantes.14.1.003. S2CID 193117593.
- Sliwa, Krzysztof (2025). Vida de Miguel de Cervantes Saavedra. Penguin Random House. ISBN 9788466348867.
- Truman, R. W. (2003). "The Rev. John Bowle's Quixotic Woes Further Explored". Cervantes: Bulletin of the Cervantes Society of America. 23 (1): 9–43. doi:10.3138/Cervantes.23.2.009. S2CID 190575135.
