= The Nobleman with his Hand on his Chest =

Painting by El Greco

- El caballero de la mano en el pecho (Spanish)
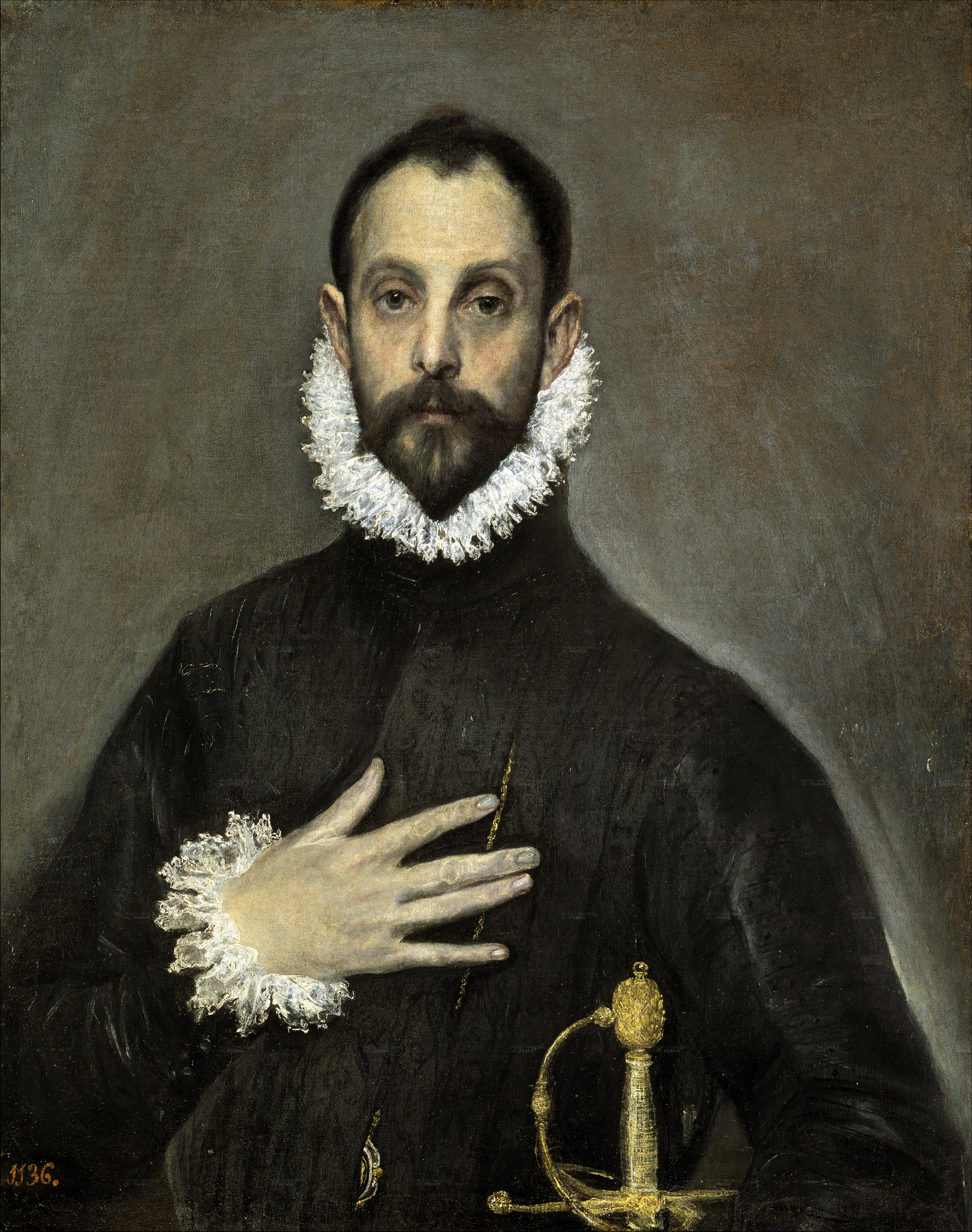
- Artist: El Greco
- Year: c. 1580
- Medium: Oil on canvas
- Dimensions: 81.8 cm × 65.8 cm (32.2 in × 25.9 in)
- Location: Museo del Prado; Madrid

The Nobleman with his Hand on his Chest (also known as The Gentleman with His Hand at His Breast or Gentleman with his Hand on his Chest) (Spanish: El caballero de la mano en el pecho) is an oil painting by El Greco, one of the earliest works painted by the artist in Spain.

Painted in Toledo around 1580, and on display at the Museo del Prado, it is the most famous of a series of secular portraits of unknown gentlemen, all of them dressed in black and wearing white ruffs, against dark backgrounds.

== Identity of the subject ==
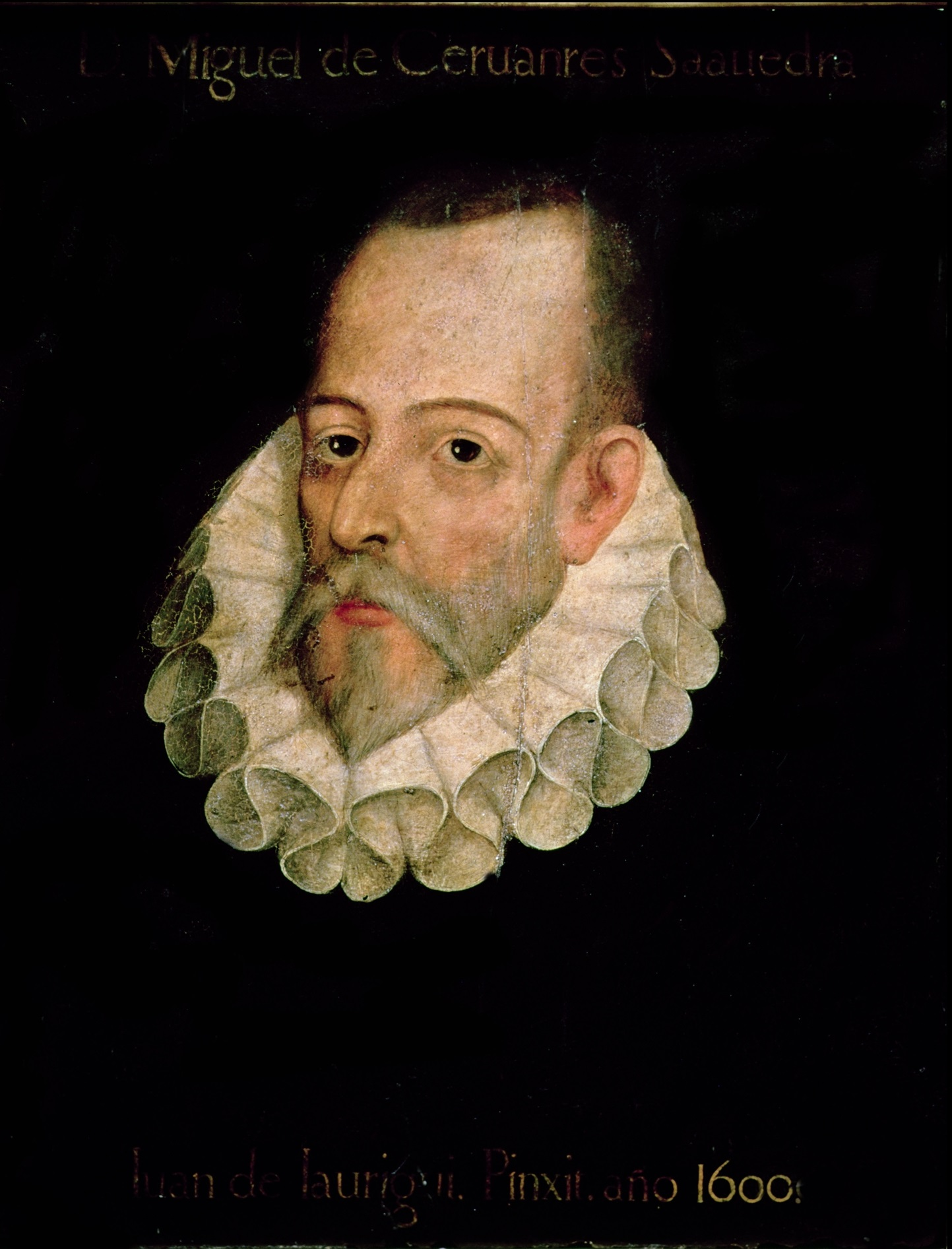
Unconfirmed portrait of Cervantes commonly said to have been painted by Juan de Jáuregui.

Some authors, including those of the Prado itself, suggest it may be a portrait of Juan de Silva y de Ribera, 3rd Marquis of Montemayor and warden of the Alcázar of Toledo. The experts at the Prado, while mentioning that "specific names have been proposed for the sitter, including that of Cervantes", and even "that the painting could be a self-portrait", go on to state that "Without doubt, the most convincing suggestion has connected this figure with the Second Marquis of Montemayor, Juan de Silva y de Ribera, a contemporary of El Greco who was appointed military commander of the Alcázar in Toledo by Philip II and Chief Notary to the Crown, a position that would explain the solemn gesture of the hand, depicted in the act of taking an oath."

The artist Rupert Shrive and the historian Alex Burghart have also argued that it may be a self-portrait.

=== Cervantes theory ===
As for the observations that point to Miguel de Cervantes as the subject, these include the coincidence of Cervantes's age and the date of the portrait, the fact that the subject's left hand is concealed and that Cervantes had lost the use of that arm fighting in the Battle of Lepanto, as well as the resemblance to the unconfirmed portrait of Cervantes supposedly painted by Juan de Jáuregui. However, modern scholarship does not accept this, or any other graphic representation of Cervantes, to be authentic, nor is there any documentation for Jáuregui having painted this particular portrait.

== See also ==
- List of works by El Greco
