= Pedro Requejo Novoa =

Spanish artist and politician

Pedro Requejo Novoa MP

Member of the Congress of Deputies
- In office 21 May 2019 – 30 May 2023
- Constituency: Zamora

Personal details
- Born: 24 June 1964 (age 61) Madrid, Kingdom of Spain
- Party: Vox

Pedro Requejo Novoa is a Spanish artist and sculptor who is known for creating works in bronze depicting famous individuals or scenes from history.

In 2019 he became a politician and a representative in the Congress of Deputies for the Vox party.

== Early life ==
Requejo Novoa was born in Madrid and grew up in the Salamanca. After high school he initially studied biological scienices at university, but dropped out and switched to studies at the Official School of Ceramics in Madrid to train as a jeweler. He then attended a fine art school before exhibiting his first work in 1994.

== Work ==
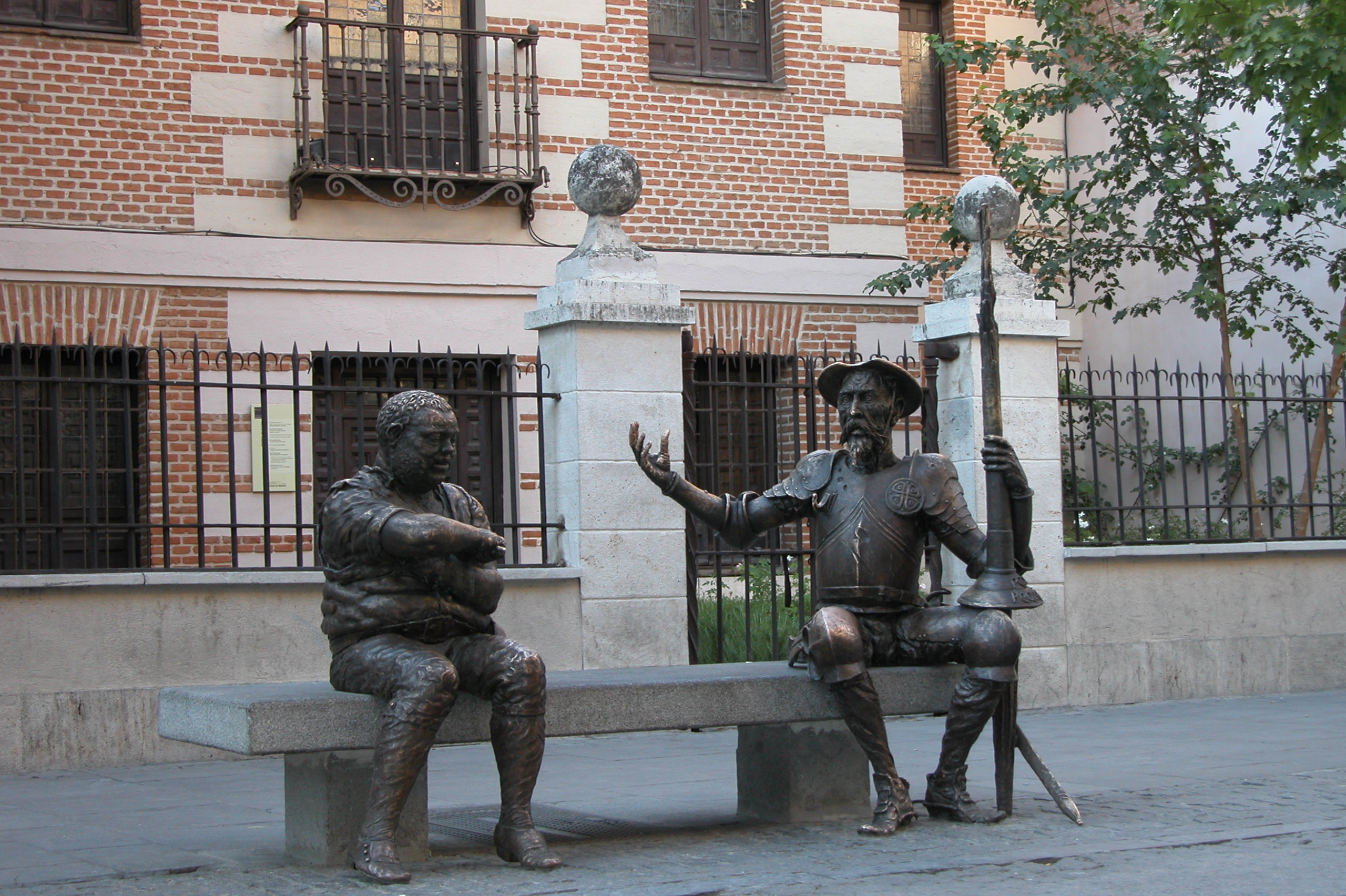
Sculptures of Don Quixote and Sancho Panza at Alcalá de Henares (2005)

Requejo Novoa's works are mainly of figures and animals cast in bronze but he has also worked in wood and stone. One of his best-known works is the castings of Don Quixote and Sancho Panza, both sitting on the bench in front of the Casa de Cervantes.

He began with the creation of small-format works until in 1996 he had the opportunity to make his first large-scale work, in this case a life-size Whale's Tail in Rosenheim, Germany. Since then he has created more than twenty works for public spaces in Spain, Germany and the Dominican Republic. His work often represents famous individuals or scenes connected to the location of the sculpture.

== Politics ==
In the April 2019 elections Requejo Novoa was elected to the Congress of Deputies for Vox representing the Zamora constituency list.

== Public works ==
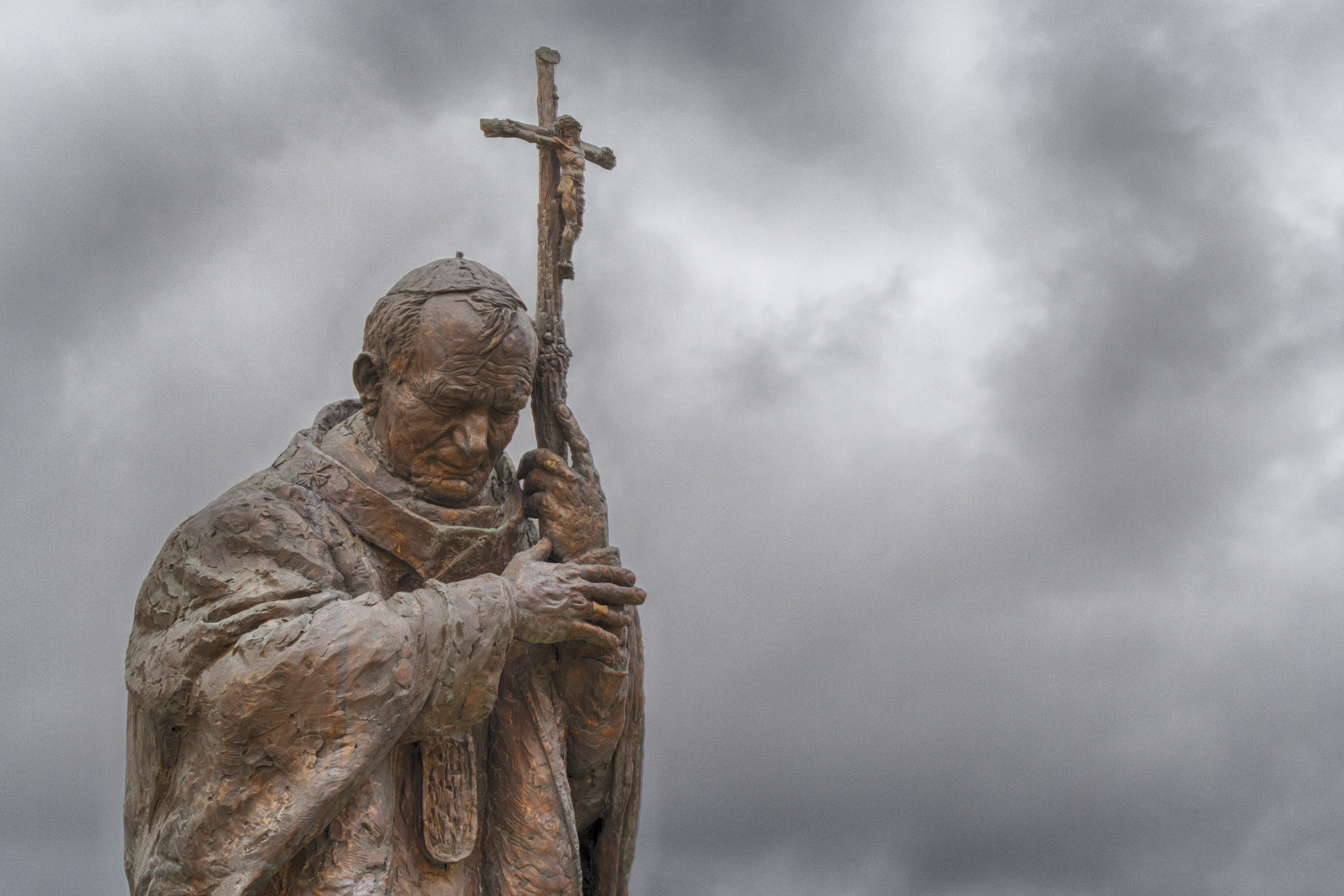
Statue of John Paul II at Alcalá de Henares (2005)

- 1996 Whale's Tail Rosenheim, Frankfurt/Main, Hamm/Westphalia.
- 1999 Bust Luis Amigó, Our Mother of Pain Parish, Madrid.
- 2000 Bust José Hierro, Cultural Center, San Sebastián de los Reyes.
- 2002 Zaratán/Valladolid, Cola de Ballena, Las Palmas de Gran Canaria.
- 2003 Victoria (Motorista), Jerez de la Frontera.
- 2004 Segador and “What books teach us”, Villanueva del Pardillo.
- 2005 Don Quixote and Sancho, Cervantes Birthplace Museum.
- 2006 John Paul II, Talavera de la Reina.
- 2008 Libertad, Plaza de la República Dominicana.

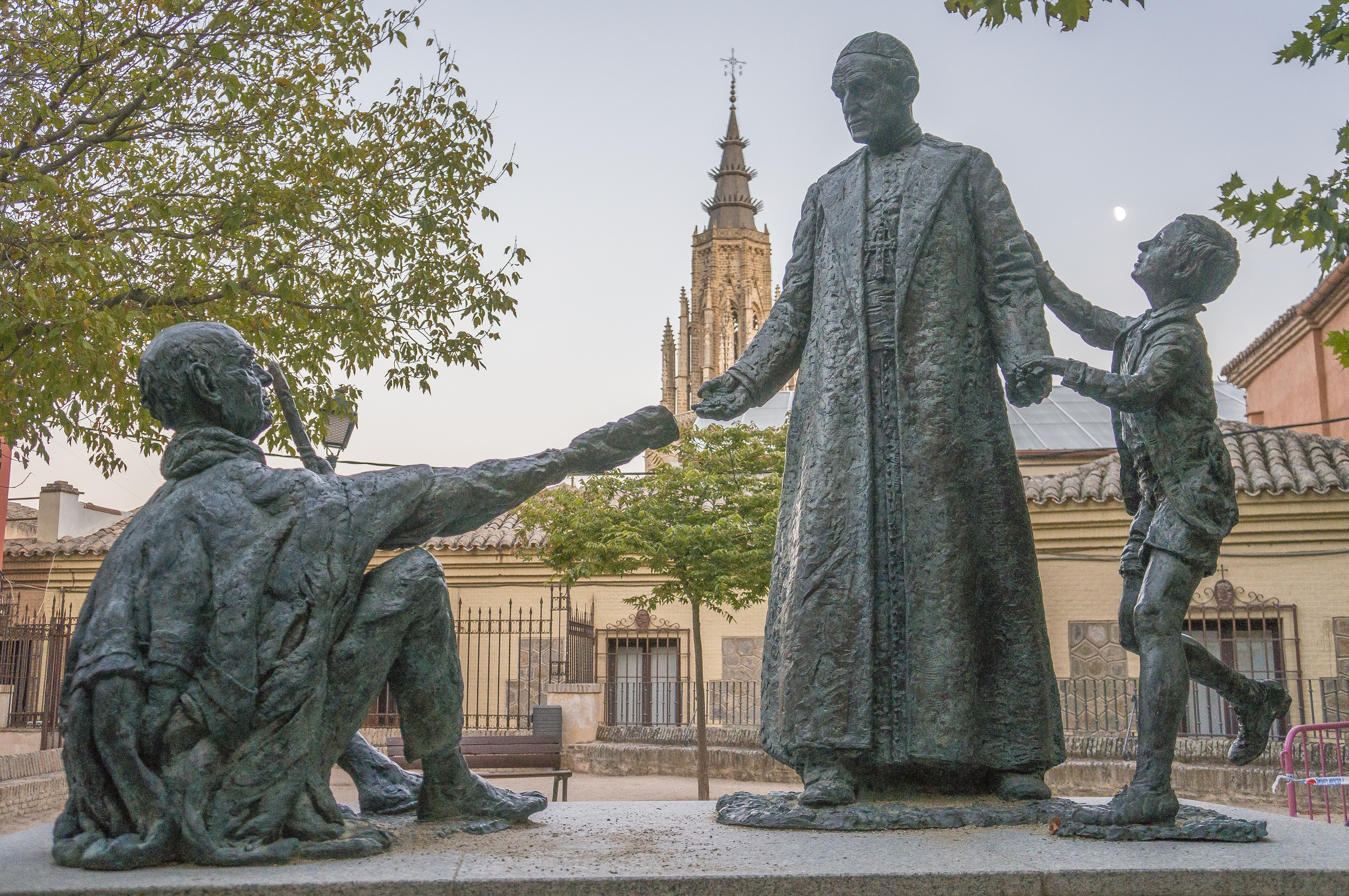
Ensemble dedicated to Ciriaco María Sancha y Hervás in Toledo (2009)

- 2009 Cardenal Sancha Complex, Plaza Juan de Mariana, Toledo.
- 2011 Enmaromado Bull Ensemble, Plaza de la Soledad.
- 2012 Easter candle holder, Cathedral of Alcalá de Henares.
- 2013 Bust Franz Xaver Priller, City Hall Bad Feilnbach, Germany.
- 2014 April Idyll by Platero, Santiago de los Caballeros, Dominican Republic.
- 2015 Hermann Rieger, Volksparkstadion, Hamburg (Germany).
