= Casa de Cervantes =

Museum in Valladolid, Spain

Cervantes' House
- Casa de Cervantes
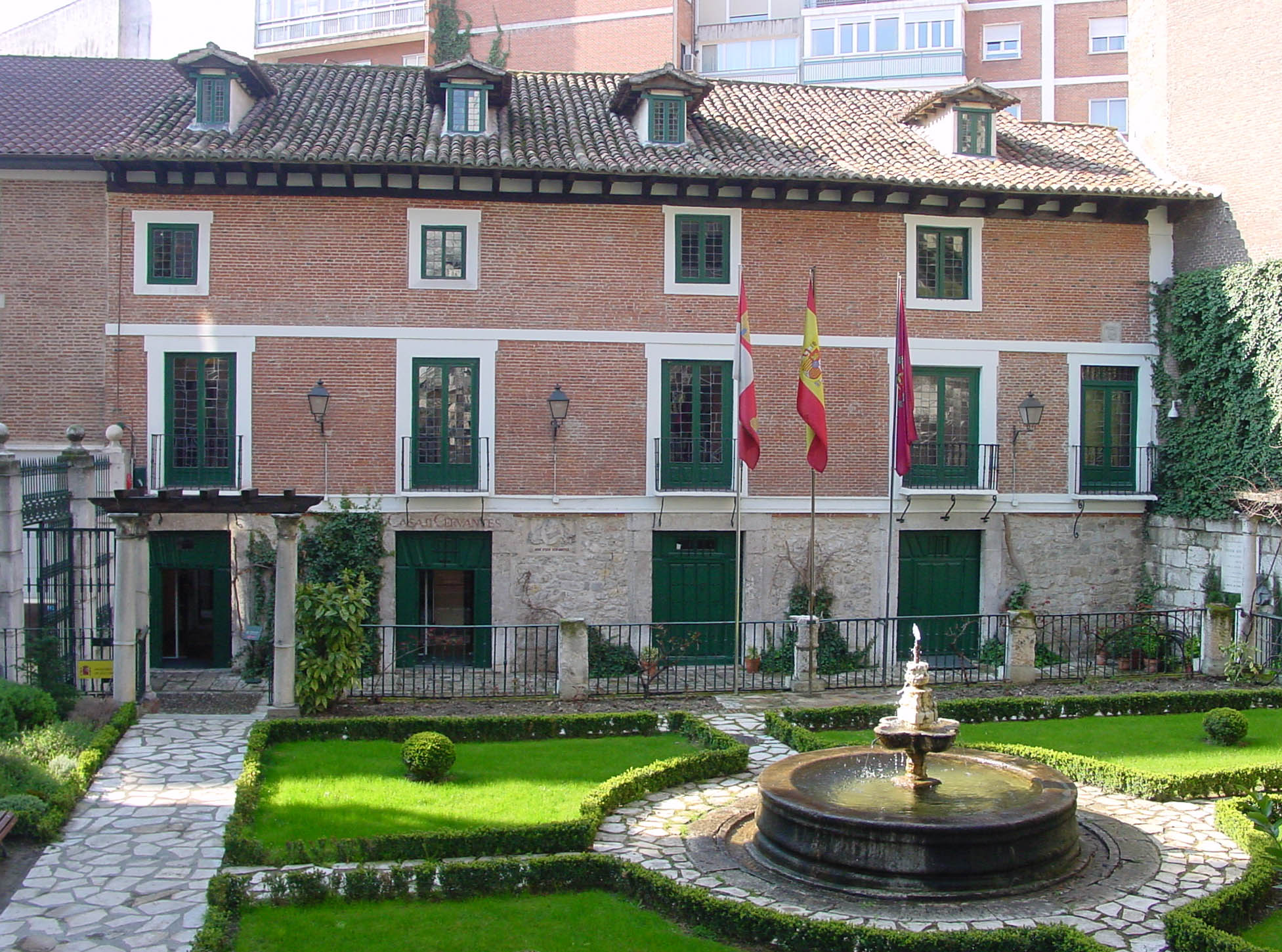
- The door on the right belongs to the Academy of Fine Arts.
- Established: 1862; Restarted 2005
- Location: Valladolid, Spain
- Coordinates: 41°38′54″N 4°43′38″W
- Director: Miguel Íscar
- Website: museocervantes.mcu.es

Spanish Cultural Heritage
- Official name: Casa de Cervantes
- Type: Immovable
- Criteria: Monument
- Designated: 9 June 1958
- Reference no.: RI-51-0001259

The Cervantes' House (Spanish: Casa de Cervantes) is a museum in Valladolid, Spain, devoted to Miguel de Cervantes. The museum is located in the house that was Cervantes's home around the time the first part of Don Quixote was published. Although he did not stay long in Valladolid, he set his story The Dialogue of the Dogs there.

It is one of the National Museums of Spain and it is attached to the Ministry of Culture. It is not to be confused with other houses associated with Cervantes, the birthplace in Alcala de Henares and the museum in Esquivias.

== Overview ==
Valladolid is where the Spanish Court was briefly, from 1601 to 1606, the last time it left Madrid. (See es:Capitalidad de Valladolid.) Cervantes' House was part of the wave of construction that filled the demand created by the sudden growth in population the Corte's relocation provoked. That is to say, it was a new or nearly-new house.

There is good information on Cervantes' Valladolid house, where he was living in 1605. By chance, a prominent nobleman was murdered in the street in front of Cervantes' house. The body of the dying man was taken to the lower floor of the house Cervantes lived in, where he expired. The ensuing investigation involved depositions from everyone in the house at the time.

From this documentation, thoroughly studied by es:Luis Astrana Marín, we know that instead of occupying the three houses joined to create the museum, his mother lived in one room and the rest of his household in another, above a tavern on the ground floor. Only women were living with him: his wife Catalina, his very religious ("beata") sister Magdalena, a seamstress for wealthy gentlemen, his sister Andrea, also a seamstress, her illegitimate daughter Costanza, Cervantes' illegitimate daughter Isabel, and a maid named María. It is well documented in the testimony that prostitutes were associated with the house, but the identity of the prostitutes has never been clarified. There were suspicions that among them may have been some of the women in Cervantes' household, who were the only single adult wonen living in the building.

== Conservation ==
The building was in a poor state at the beginning of the 20th century but was rescued by among others Archer Milton Huntington. It has a heritage listing (currently Bien de Interés Cultural, Property of Cultural Value), and has been protected since 9 June 1958.

== Gallery ==
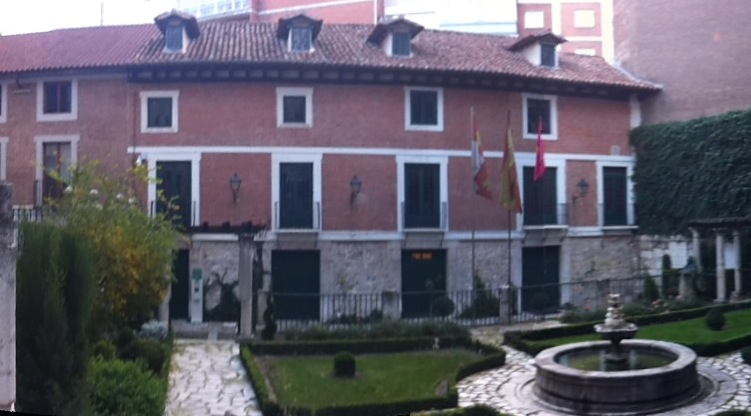

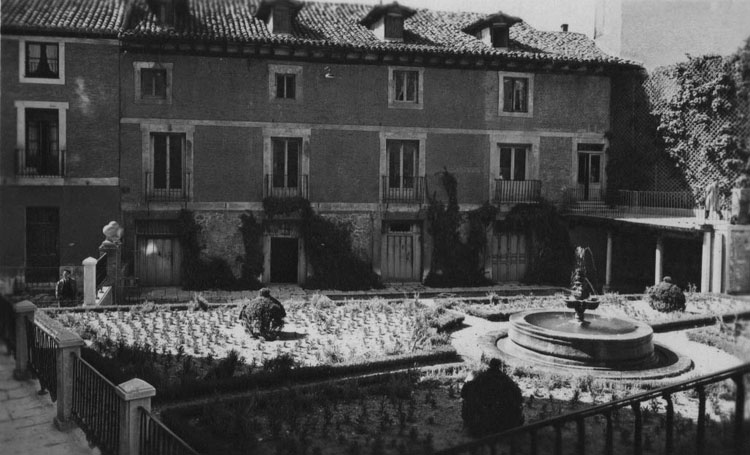

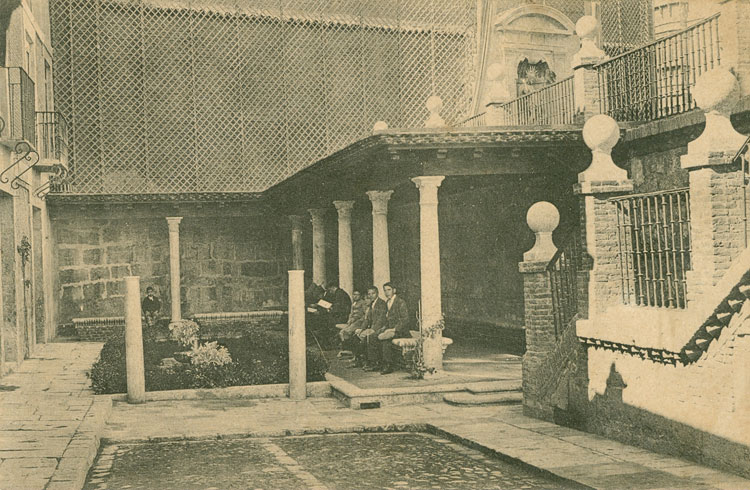

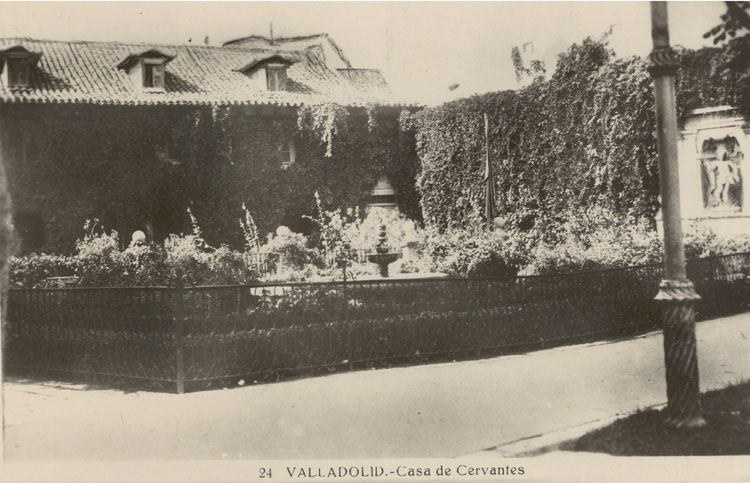

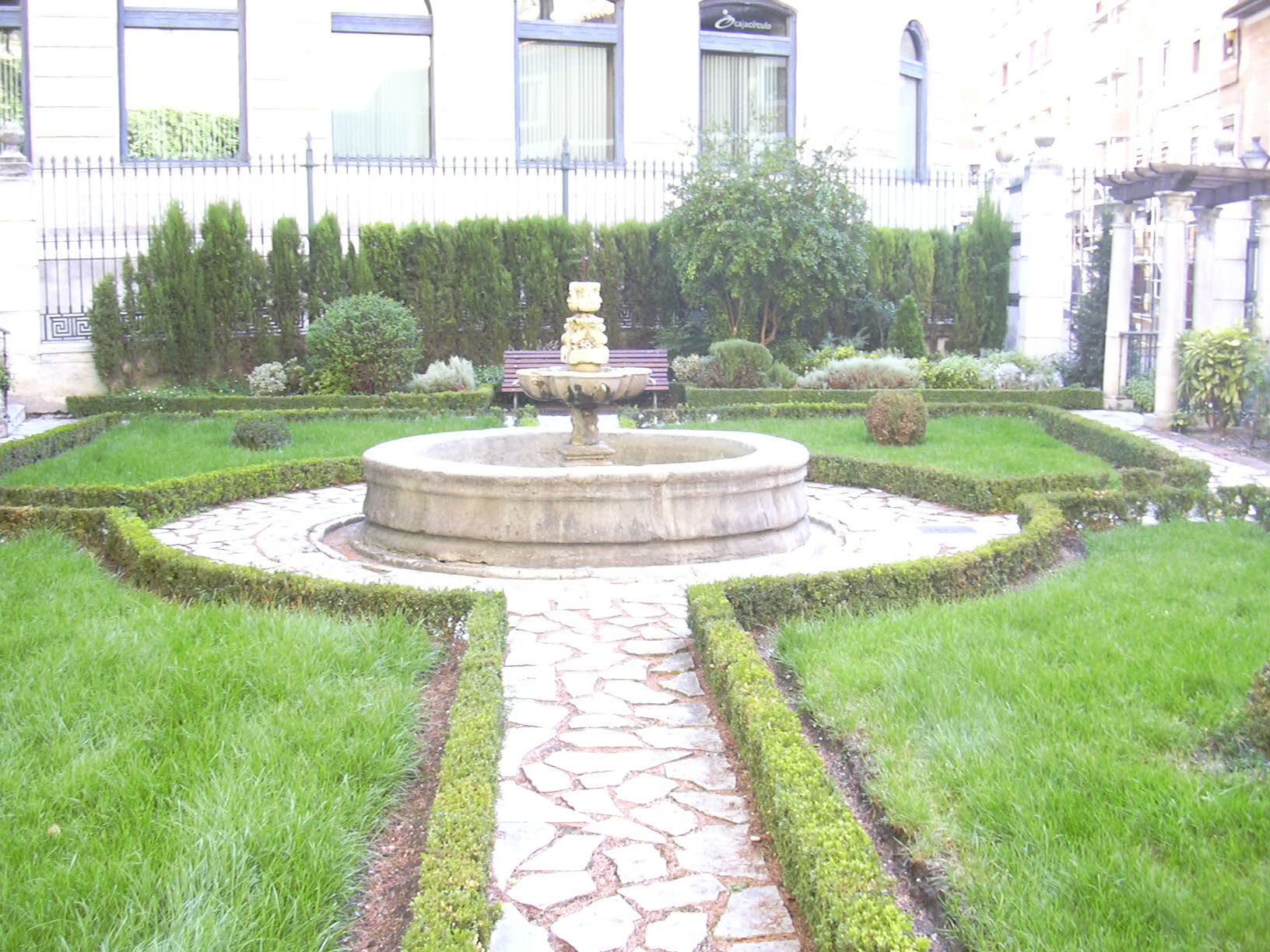

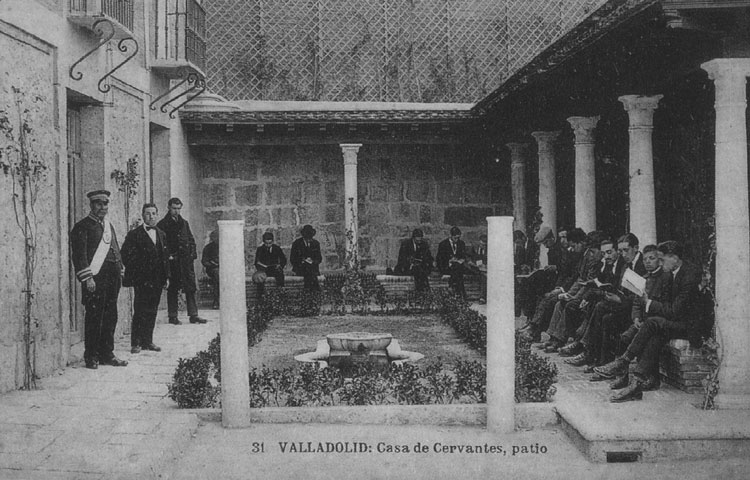
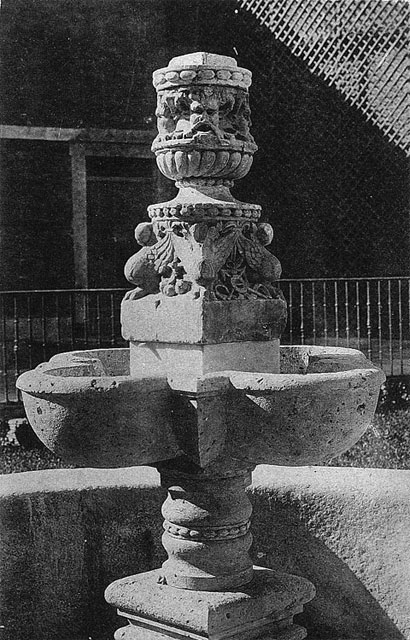

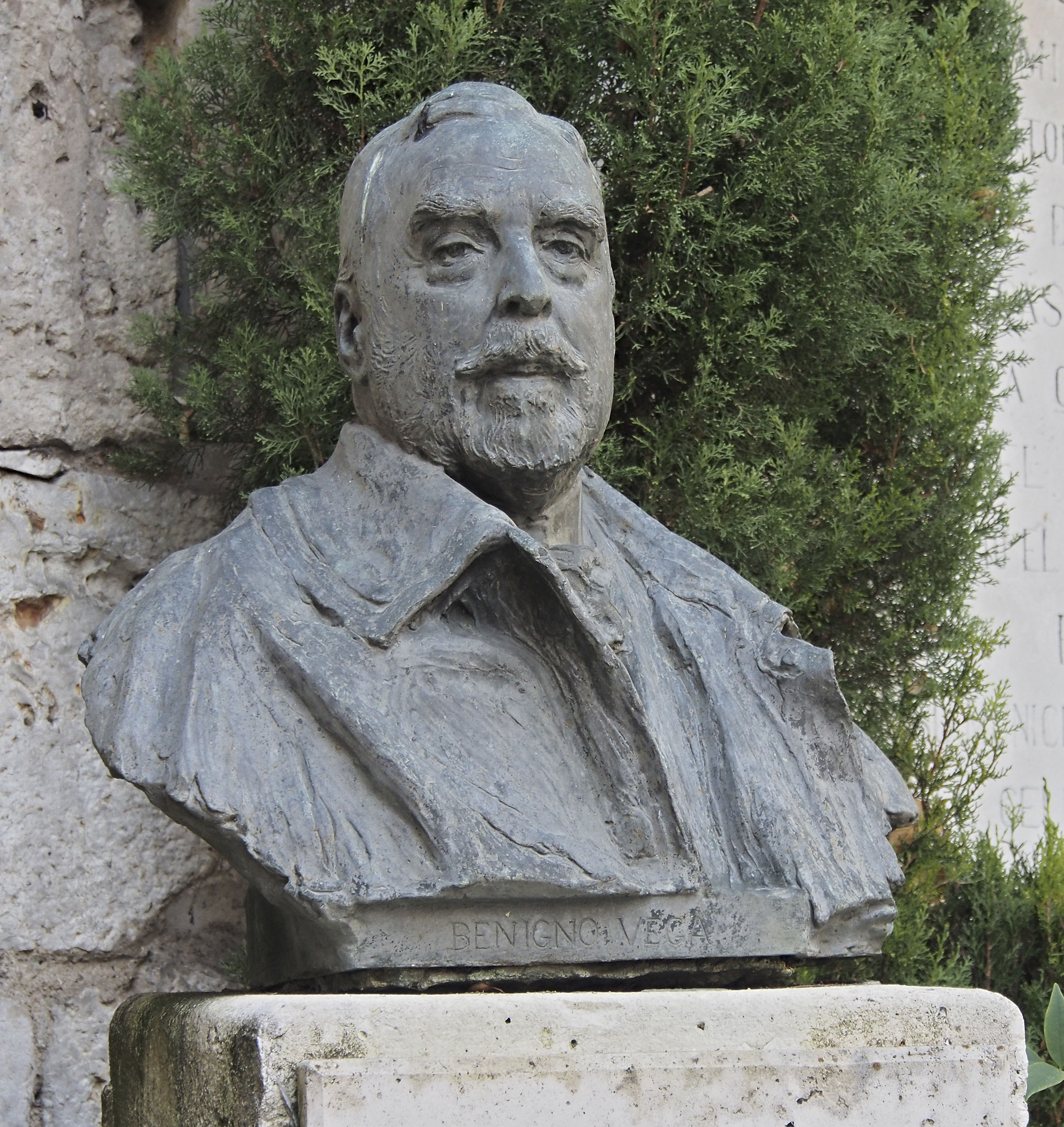

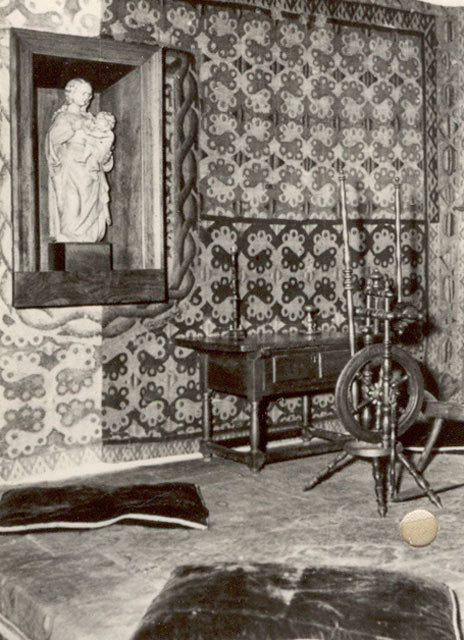

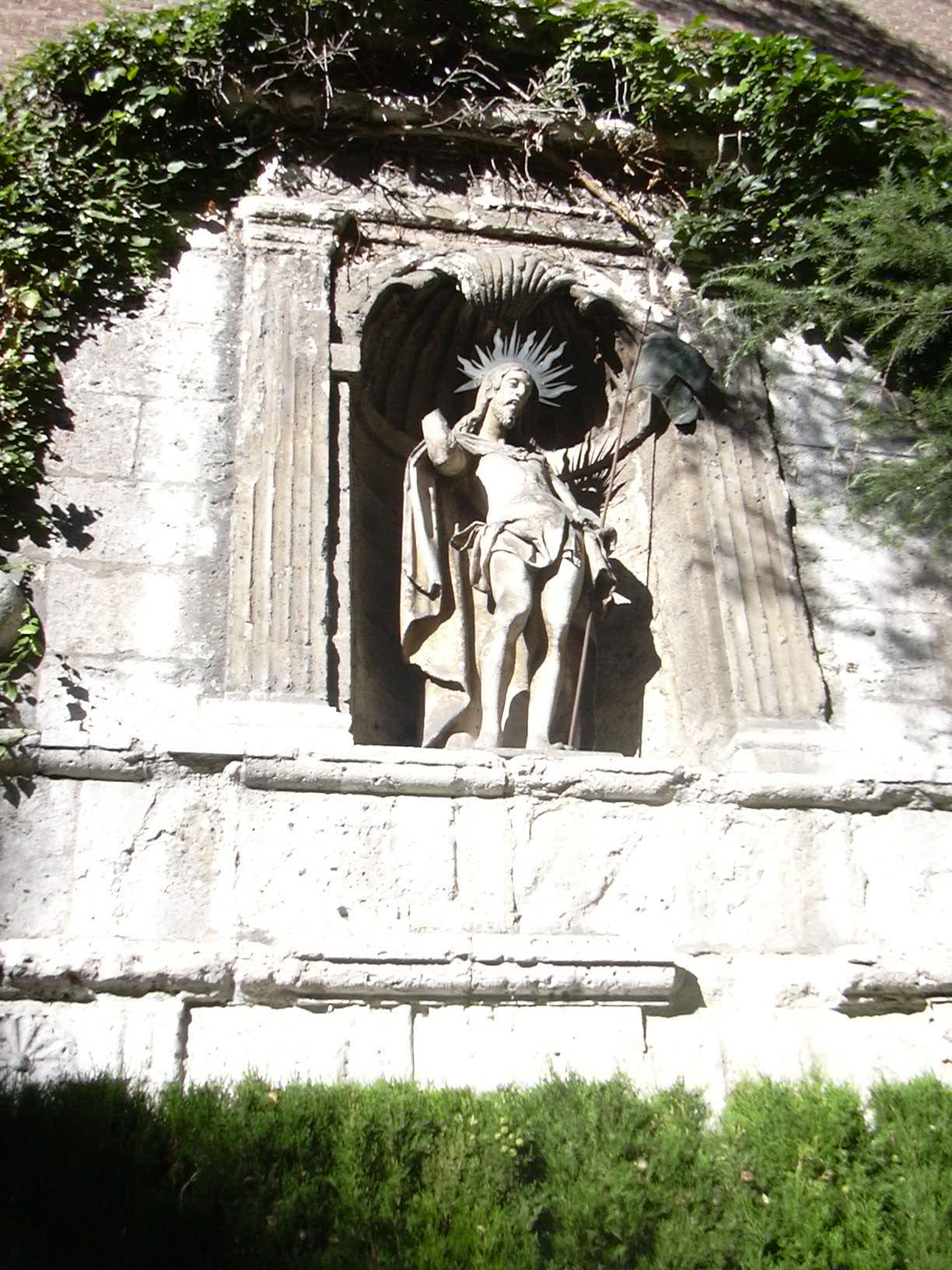

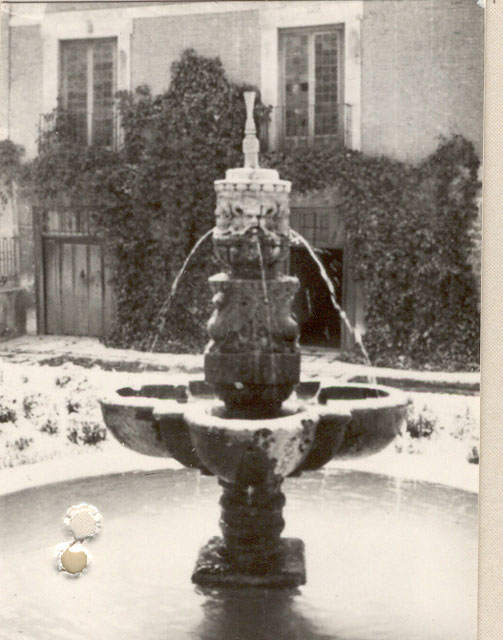

== Bibliography ==
- Juan Agapito y Revilla, Boletín de la Sociedad castellana de excursiones (1905–1906), tomo II.
- Juan Agapito y Revilla, Las calles de Valladolid, Valladolid, Imprenta Casa Martín, 1937.
- N. Sanz y Ruiz de la Peña, La casa de Cervantes en Valladolid, Fundaciones Vega-Inclán, 1972.
- Javier Salazar Rincón, El escritor y su entorno. Cervantes y la corte de Valladolid en 1605, Valladolid, Junta de Castilla y León, 2006.
- Macarena Márquez, Lo que Cervantes me contó de su casa de Valladolid, Jeromín 12º, Valladolid, Servicios de Publicaciones del Ayuntamiento, 2012.
