= Viaje del Parnaso =

1614 poem written by Miguel de Cervantes

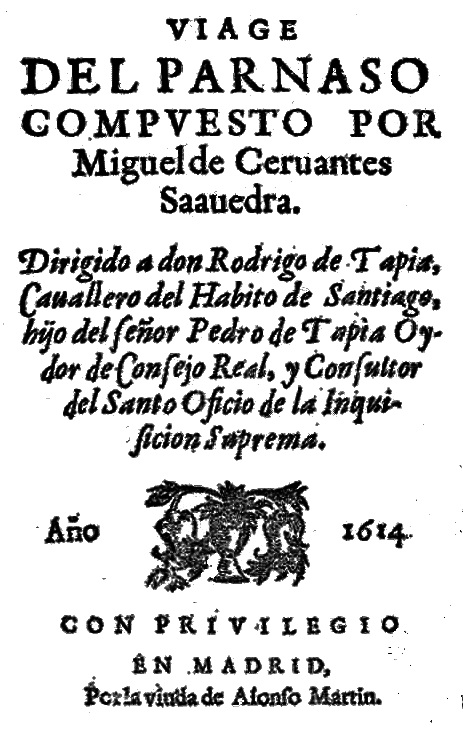
Frontispiece of the 1614 edition.

Viaje del Parnaso (Note: Sometimes erroneously called Viaje al Parnaso) ("Journey to Parnassus") is a poetic work by Miguel de Cervantes. It was first published in 1614, two years before the author's death.

== Overview ==
The chief object of the poem is to survey contemporary Spanish poets, assembled on an imaginary boat to Parnassus, and ridicule (and sometimes throw overboard) those who, in Cervantes' opinion, are deficient. This satire is of a peculiar character: an effusion of sportive humour, leaving it a matter of doubt whether Cervantes intended to praise or to ridicule the individuals whom he points out as being particularly worthy of the favour of Apollo. He himself says: "Those whose names do not appear in this list may be just as well pleased as those who are mentioned in it." Cervantes' aims in composing the poem seem to have been to characterise true poetry according to his own poetic feelings, to manifest in a decided way his enthusiasm for the art even in his old age, and to hold up a mirror for the conviction of those who were only capable of making rhymes and inventing extravagances. Concealed satire and open jesting are the combined elements of this work.

The poem is divided into eight chapters, and the versification is in tercets. The composition is half comic and half serious. After many humorous incidents, Mercury appears to Cervantes (who is represented as travelling to Parnassus in the most miserable condition), saluting him with the title of the "Adam of poets". Mercury, after addressing to him many flattering compliments, conducts him to a ship entirely built of different kinds of verse, which is intended to convey a cargo of Spanish poets to the kingdom of Apollo. The description of the ship is a comic allegory. Mercury shows him a list of the poets with whom Apollo wishes to become acquainted and this list, owing to the problematic nature of its half ironical and half serious praises, has proved a stumbling block to commentators. In the midst of the reading, Cervantes suddenly drops the list. The poets are now described as crowding on board the ship in numbers as countless as drops of rain in a shower, or grains of sand on the seacoast; and such a tumult ensues, that, to save the ship from sinking by their pressure, the sirens raise a furious storm. The flights of imagination become more wild as the story advances. The storm subsides, and is succeeded by a shower of poets, that is to say poets fall from the clouds. One of the first who descends on the ship is Lope de Vega, on whom Cervantes seizes this opportunity of pronouncing an emphatic praise. The remainder of the poem, a complete analysis of which would occupy too much space, proceeds in the same spirit.

One of the pieces of verse written by Cervantes, is his description of the goddess Poesy, whom he sees in all her glory in the kingdom of Apollo. To this picture the portrait of the goddess Vain-Glory, who afterwards appears to the author in a dream, forms a companion. Among the passages, which for burlesque humour vie with Don Quixote is the description of a second storm, in which Neptune vainly endeavours to plunge the poetasters to the bottom of the deep. Venus prevents them from sinking, by changing them into gourds and leather flasks. At length a formal battle is fought between the real poets and some of the poetasters.

The poem is interspersed throughout with singularly witty ideas; and only a few passages fail to live up to the general standard. It had no prototype. The language is classical throughout, but Cervantes added to the poem a comic supplement in prose, praising his own ability.

== See also ==
- 1614 in poetry
