= Nicolaes Borremans =

Nicolaes Borremans (c. 1614 – 1679) became in 1649 a Remonstrant preacher in Nieuwkoop and in Maasland from 1650 till 1679 when, due to a disease, he asked to be dismissed after which he was pensioned off.

Borremans was born in Amsterdam. Some of his poems are to be found in the anthology De Bloemkrans van verscheidene gedichten door eenige liefhebbers der poezy byeenverzameld, published in Amsterdam in 1659. He also translated Matthaeus Vossius’ Annales Hollandaises et Zeelandaises, known for their charming Latin style, as Historische Jaarboecken van Holland en Zeeland (published in Gorinchem in 1677) as well as several other theological works published under the pseudonym N.B.A, such as Gerard Brandt the Younger's poems (Gedichten) which he collected and which were published in 1640 in Rotterdam.

== External link and source ==
- This article is a compilation of biographical data from the web site of the digital library of Dutch literature
