= Fernando de Prado =

Historian, writer, and lecturer

Fernando de Prado Pardo-Manuel de Villena
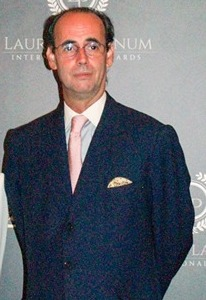
- Born: September 1, 1963 (age 63)
- Occupation: Historian
- Parent(s): Julio de Prado Colón de Carvajal and Isabel Pardo-Manuel de Villena de Verastegui

Fernando de Prado Pardo-Manuel de Villena (born September 1, 1963, in San Sebastian, Guipuzcoa, Spain) is historian, writer and lecturer. He is known for having conceived and promoted the search for the identification of the remains of the writer Miguel de Cervantes.

== Biography ==
=== Birth and childhood ===
Fernando de Prado was born on September 1, 1963, in the town of San Sebastian in a family of Spanish nobility. His father was Julio de Prado Colon de Carvajal, Conde de la Conquista (Count of the Conquest), brother of Manuel and Diego de Prado and Colon de Carvajal, descendants of Christopher Columbus. His mother, Isabel Pardo-Manuel de Villena Verastegui, is Baroness of Montevillena, belonged to the House of Manuel de Villena, Counts of Via Manuel.

Fernando de Prado is the cousin of Borja de Prado Eulate, President of Endesa.

=== Early life ===
He studied law, history and geography at the Complutense University and the University of San Pablo CEU. He graduated in genealogy, heraldry and nobility by the Marquis de Aviles School of the Association of Graduates in Genealogy, Heraldry and Nobility, of which he later became director. He achieved a master's degree in protocol and business relations by the European Institute of Health and Welfare of Madrid.

=== Later life ===
In 1991 he was a member of the scientific committee of inquiry, later its coordinator, for the exhibition "May 2, 1808", Exhibition that formed part of the events of Madrid Cultural Capital in 1992. Later he was technical commissioner of the exhibition "The Universities of Madrid", also for the Cultural Capital. For several years he worked as a guide for dignitaries and advisor of the Army Museum in Madrid. He also worked as deputy director of Actas Publishing and deputy director of the Trebol distributor. At last he was the director and promoter of the project search and identification of the remains of Miguel de Cervantes. Currently he develops cultural and other cooperation projects with foreign companies in Spain.

== Published works ==
- Catalogue of doctoral thesis on geography and history conserved in the archives of the Complutense University of Madrid :1900-1987 Alfonso Bullón de Mendoza (Director) ISBN 84-505-7802-7
- Secret societies in Spain León Arsenal e Hipólito Sanchiz (Colaborador)2006 ISBN 978-84-08-06344-5
- Corners of the Spanish history con León Arsenal 2007 ISBN 978-84-414-2050-2
- Heads of nobility : origen and secrets of the spanish aristocracy 2008 ISBN 978-84-96840-37-9

== Honours, decorations, awards and distinctions ==
- Knight Commander of the Order of Alfonso X the Wise (Cross, 2015)
- Laurel Platinium (Award, 2014)

== Bibliography ==
- Article by Ashifa Kassam The Guardian, April 25, 2014
- Article by Raphael Minder The New York Times, March 11, 2014
