= Rhys Cain =

Welsh writer

Rhys Cain (c. 1540–1614) was a Welsh-language poet who lived in the north east of Wales near Oswestry.

Rhys was a wandering poet who, in the absence of a fixed patron, visited the local aristocracy in search of patronage. Rhys was a contemporary of William Morgan, who first translated the Bible into Welsh:

You made each word sound so sensible,
The word of God so comprehensible!
