= The Dialogue of the Dogs =

Short story by Miguel de Cervantes

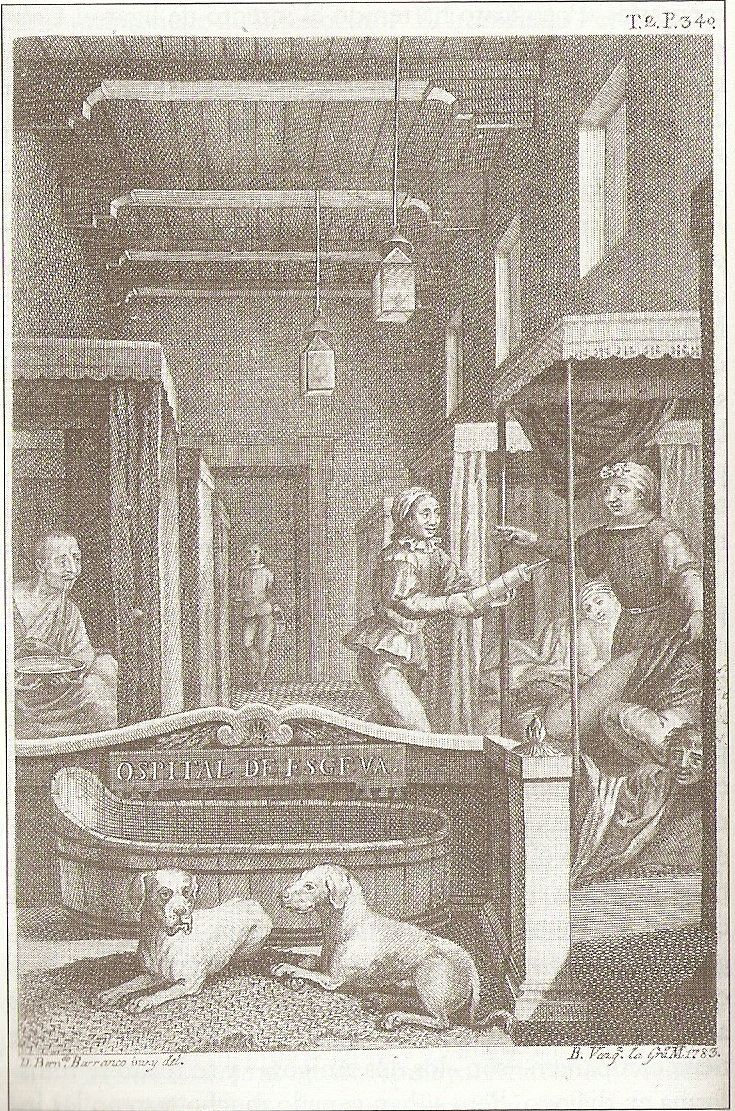
Engraving of the two dogs

"The Dialogue of the Dogs" ("El coloquio de los perros"; also "The Conversation of the Dogs" or "Dialogue between Cipión and Berganza") is a novella originating from the fantasy world of Alférez Campuzano, a character from a short story, The Deceitful Marriage ("El casamiento engañoso"). Both are written by author Miguel de Cervantes. It was originally published in a 1613 collection of novellas called Novelas ejemplares.

== Author ==
Miguel de Cervantes Saavedra was born in Alcalá de Henares, a university town near Madrid, on September 29, 1547. He was a soldier, writer of novels, poems, and plays, and an accountant and tax collector. One of the greatest authors of Spanish literature, he became internationally known for his novel, Don Quixote. Cervantes wrote a series of twelve novellas which include "The Deceitful Marriage" and "The Dialogue of the Dogs". He died in Madrid on April 22, 1616.

=== Exemplary Stories ===
Exemplary Stories (Novelas ejemplares) is a series of twelve novellas that follow the model established in Italy and written by Miguel de Cervantes between 1590 and 1612. The collection was printed in Madrid in 1613 by Juan de la Cuesta, and was well received in the wake of the release of the first part of Don Quixote.

== Narrative ==
The story is loosely tied to the previous story in the volume, "El casamiento engañoso" ("The Deceitful Marriage"), which is about a dishonest suitor duped out of his wealth by his conniving young bride. The experience lands the suitor in a hospital in Valladolid. Suffering from syphilis, he looks out of the hospital window and, presumably in a delirium, he sees and hears two dogs begin to speak at the stroke of midnight. One dog, Berganza, tells the other, Cipión (Scipio), about his experiences with his various human masters and opines in a highly refined manner on a slew of social and philosophical themes such as greed, Gypsies, dishonesty, honor, and witchcraft. Cipión promises to tell his own life story the following night. Cervantes leaves the reader to determine whether or not the dogs have actually been talking or if the bedridden man has imagined it.

== Plot ==
In the story, Cervantes offers the readers, through the protagonists’ (the two dogs') dialogues, his own narrative poetics. He introduces a ...story and dialogue that took place between Scipio and Berganza, who are commonly known as Mahudes's dogs and who belong to the Hospital of [the] Resurrection, which is in the city of Valladolid, outside the Campo Gate...

Berganza's story begins with the description of life in a slaughter house in Seville, where he was born. He gives a lot of details about the doings of the underworld, its thieves, and its villains. Scipio adds comments and gives advice on how to narrate a story properly: "If you’re going to take this long to describe the condition of the masters you’ve had and the failings of their professions, [...] I want to point something out to you, and you’ll see the truth of it when I relate my life story. Some stories are intrinsically appealing, others are made appealing in the way they are told".

The ‘colloquium’ finishes with a sentence that carries the reader back to the principal theme of the short story "The Deceitful Marriage", the narrative principal frame, in which the circle is closed with Peralta and Ensign Campuzano becoming great admirers of the invention of "The Dialogue of the Dogs".

=== Berganza's history ===
The following is a summary of the multitude of jobs, services, and tasks that were asked by different owners of Berganza throughout his life:

- The first task that Berganza exercises was in a slaughter house in Seville when his first owner, Nicholas Snub-Nose, taught him to rush forth at the bulls. Berganza, newly renamed Barcino, had to take a basket full of food to a friend of the owner, every day. He used to deliver to a certain mistress, in the early morning, what Nicholas had stolen during the night.
- The second task that he had was that of a shepherd where the only thing Berganza had to do was to take care to the sheep and to watch out for the wild animal attacks such as wolves; but since he was being punished, in addition to this work, it was only possible for Berganza to sleep every now and then.
- Later Berganza was working with a very rich merchant, where he had the role of a guardian behind the door. He was rewarded for doing it so well, so instead of guarding the door, with the children of the merchant, Berganza had a much calmer and relaxed job since he simply had to play with them, and these children were so grateful that he was living like a king. But, since he could not come to their college, because it was distracting to the other students, Berganza was sent back to his previous position: guardian behind the door.
- After leaving his previous job, he started working for a corrupt police officer who actually supported a group of thugs.
- A man who welcomed him taught him to do cute tricks, things that were surprising or that were making the people laugh. Thanks to what Berganza learned, his owner earned a lot of money by leading his dog to different places to put on his show.
- The following owners that Berganza had were gypsies, and he had to do same kind of job as with his previous owner.
- In this following job, he had to guard the garden, together with a Morisco, who was a writer. This work was easy.
- The latter work was of guardian in a hospital together with Scipio, in Valladolid.

== Characters ==
Alférez Campuzano is a protagonist in the previous short story called "The Deceitful Marriage" in which he gives graduate Peralta an incredible dialogue to read that he had written and of which he claims he was a witness. It purported events occurred when he was convalescing at the Hospital of the Resurrection (in Valladolid):

Scipio and Berganza are Mahudes's dogs and possess human skills, such as speech and reasoning, which allows them to judge and criticize from afar. They are static prominent characters, since these two don't change attitude and they lead the tone of the conversation during the entire story. Berganza, thanks to a sudden ability to speak, tells his life-story to Scipio, another dog who gives his advice on how Berganza should narrate his own story.

== Themes ==
- Scipio helps Berganza by giving him some advice on the way he uses storytelling.
- Berganza exposes the evilness and the corruption of the society.

How men perceived the dogs

Since the dogs are a symbol of friendship and inviolable loyalty, when their owners die the dogs feel their death; many of these dogs stop eating and do not to separate themselves from their owners' graves. But, with Berganza's life story, the dichotomy of preconceived ideas of friendship and loyalty fade away; the readers get the truth within the underpinnings of owner—dog relationships.

== Miguel Cervantes analysis ==
Imaginative prose fiction at the time was viewed with great suspicion in certain quarters. Cervantes's own Don Quixote explores and parodies the idea that literature not grounded in empirical reality is dangerous stuff in "The Deceitful Marriage".

In "The Dialogue of the Dogs", Cervantes is most overtly concerned with a reader's suspension of disbelief. He playfully places a quasi-picaresque autobiography, the most 'realist' fiction of its time in its baring of society's vices, in a totally fantastic framework of rational, talking dogs. He then defies us, like Peralta, not to get caught up in it. Like so many other stories, it is modeled on a variety of sources: the Lucianic dialogue, Aesop's fables, and of course, the pseudo-autobiography, a satirical form in its own right which Cervantes takes the opportunity to satirize further.

[...] It is a picaresque narrative with its own in-built critique - a story about the creative process and how to cast a critical eye over the expanding text; Scipio is forever interrupting Berganza's story to question where it is leading; or to comment on repeated digression; or its tendency to moralize. It is also about the process of reading and the power of imagination. The witch at the center of the story claims that during the Sabbath orgies it is impossible to ascertain whether the experience is real or fantasy. The analogy is clear. If the fantasy is powerful enough we can find ourselves believing that dogs are capable of rational speech and worry about the satirical nature of their words.

== Influence and adaptations ==
Cervantes' novellas inspired several English Jacobean dramas. Plays based on the novellas include Beaumont and Fletcher's Love's Pilgrimage (adapted from "Las dos doncellas" or The Two Damsels); Fletcher's The Chances ("La señora Cornelia" or The Lady Cornelia); Fletcher's Rule a Wife and Have a Wife (El casamiento engañoso or The Deceitful Marriage), among others.

Sigmund Freud was interested in the story and identified with Cipión.
