= Miguel de Cervantes Memorial =

Memorial by Joseph Jacinto Mora in San Francisco, California, U.S.

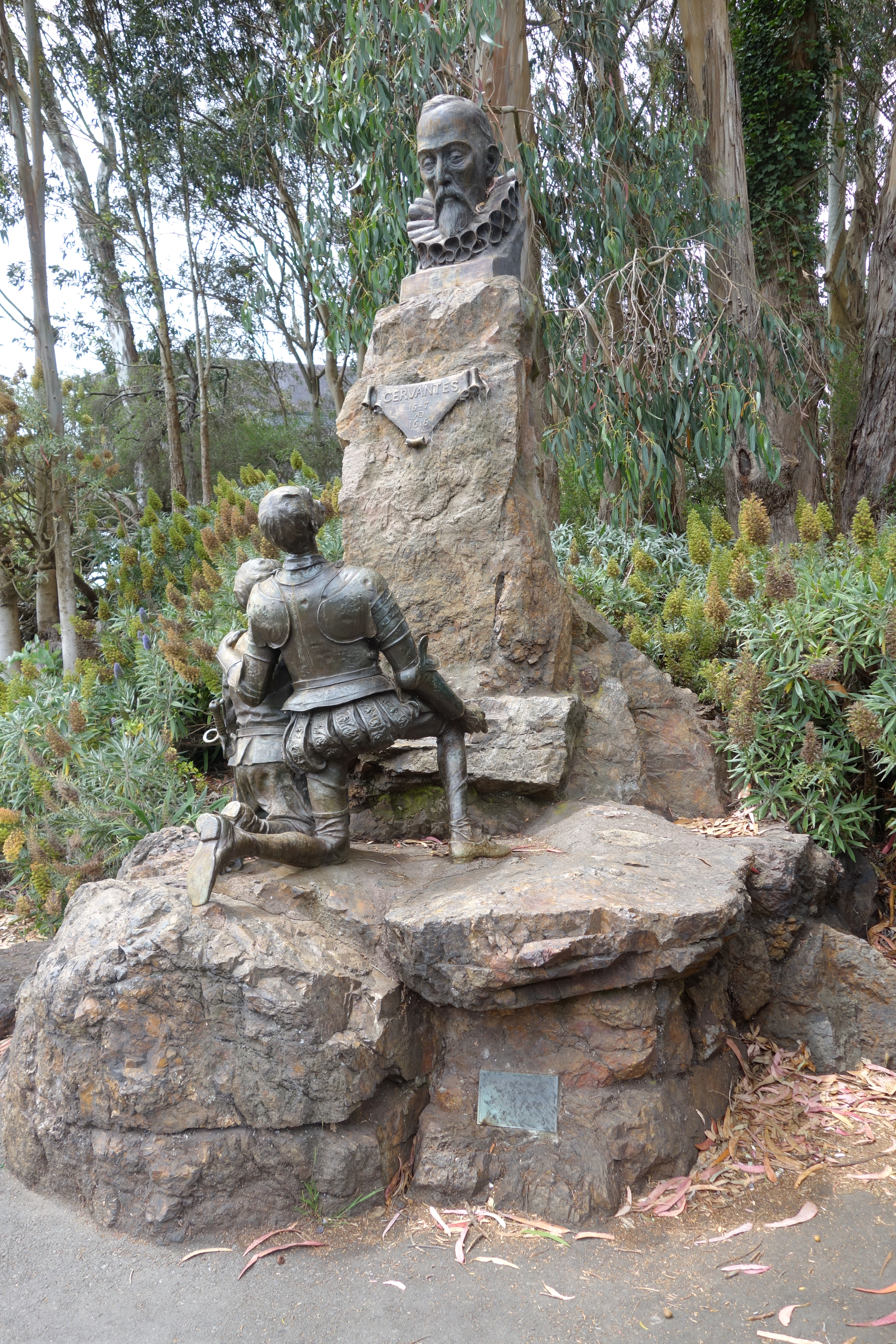
- The monument in 2014
- Artist: Joseph Jacinto Mora
- Location: Golden Gate Park, San Francisco, California, U.S.; 37°46′19.6″N 122°28′0.5″W

The Miguel de Cervantes Memorial by Joseph Jacinto Mora is located in Golden Gate Park in San Francisco, California. The memorial depicts two of Miguel de Cervantes's characters, Sancho Panza and Don Quixote, kneeling before a bust of his head.

== Vandalism ==
In 2020, the statue was vandalized with red paint. "Bastard" was sprayed over the face of the monument, and the eyes of the bust were covered in paint.
