= Juan de Jáuregui =

Spanish painter (1583–1641)

Juan Martínez de Jáuregui y Aguilar (Spanish: [ˈxwan de ˈxawɾeɡi]; also known as Juan Martínez de Jáuregui y Hurtado de la Sal; 24 November 1583 – 11 January 1641) was a Spanish poet, scholar and painter in the Siglo de Oro.

== Early life ==
Juan Martínez de Jáuregui y Hurtado de la Sal was born and baptized in Seville, Andalusia. His parents were Miguel Martínez de Jáuregui, a hidalgo—which is an untitled Spanish nobleman—from La Rioja, and Doña Isabel de la Sal from Seville. He was the fifth of their ten children; the oldest became later commissioner (regidor) of Seville. The poet changed his second name (the one coming from his mother) to "Aguilar", coming from one of his grandmothers.

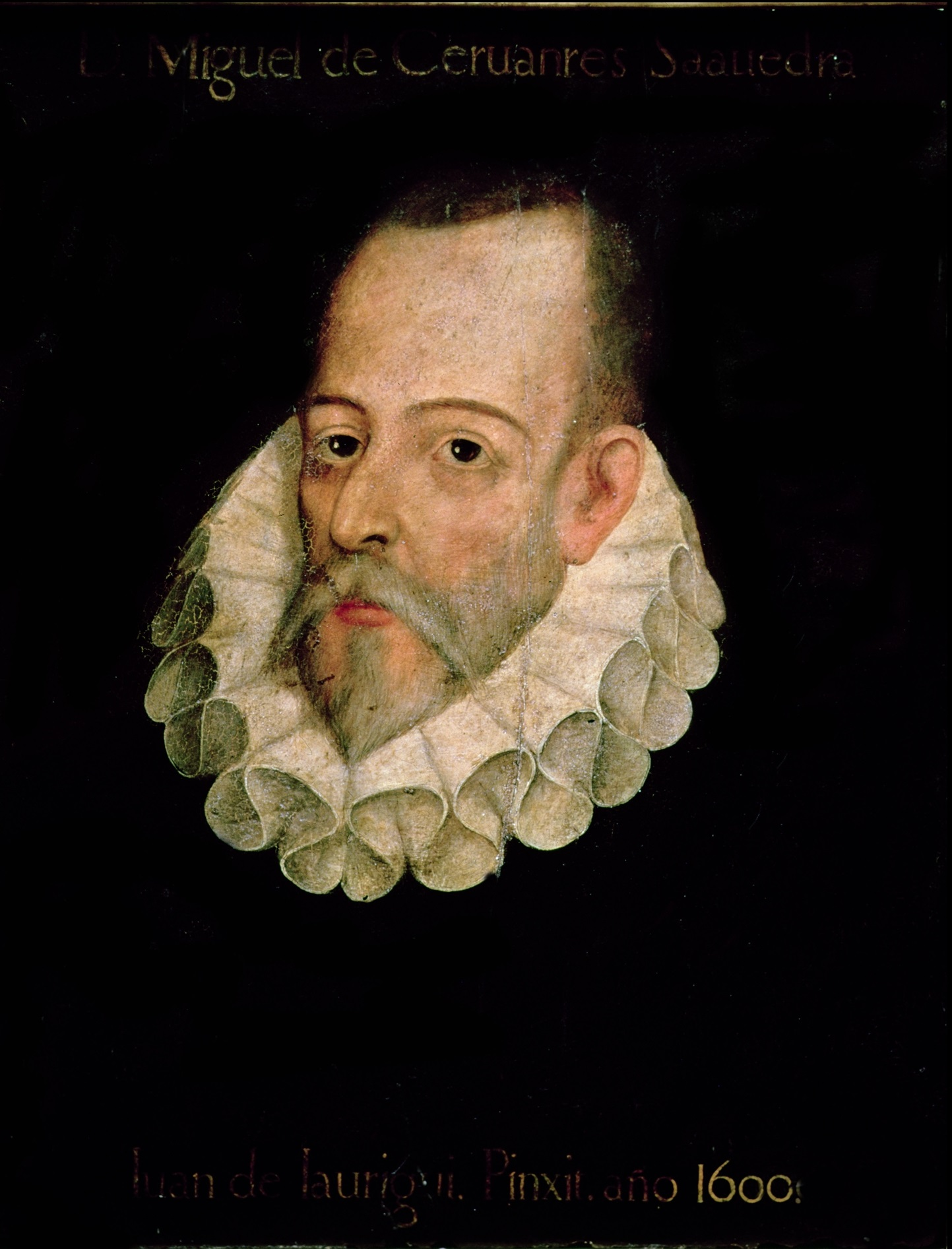
Unsigned portrait of an unidentified gentleman, which once was taken to be Jáuregui's lost portrait of Cervantes. The name of Cervantes at the top and that of Jáuregui at the bottom were added centuries after it was painted.

About his youth very little is known. In his discourse Arte de la pintura (The Art of Painting) some references to various travels to Italy can be found and it is known that he stayed in Rome, probably to study painting.

== Career ==
He returned to Spain shortly before 1610 with a reputation as both a painter and a poet. In the preface to the Novelas exemplares, Miguel de Cervantes says that Jáuregui painted his picture, and in the second part of Don Quixote, praises Jáuregui's translation of Tasso's Aminta, published at Rome in 1607. The picture by Jáuregui is lost; there is no evidence supporting any surviving painting being that of Jáuregui.

Jáuregui's Rimas (1618), a collection of graceful lyrics, where he integrated also some translations of Horace, Martial and Ausonius, is preceded by a controversial preface which attracted much attention on account of its outspoken declaration against the culteranismo of Luis de Góngora. Another Spanish poet, Francisco de Quevedo, mentioned Jáuregui in "La perinola" with scorn.

Through the influence of Gaspar de Guzmán, Count-Duke of Olivares, he was appointed groom of the chamber to Philip IV, and gave an elaborate exposition of his artistic doctrines in the Discurso poético contra el hablar culto y oscuro (1624), a skillful attack on the new theories, which procured for its author membership in the honorary Order of Calatrava. It is plain, however, that the shock of controversy had shaken Jáuregui's convictions, and his poem Orfeo (1624) is visibly influenced by Góngora.

== Death ==
Jáuregui died in Madrid on 11 January 1641, leaving behind him a translation of the Pharsalia which was not published until 1684. This rendering reveals Jáuregui as a complete convert to the new school, and it has been argued that, exaggerating the affinities between Lucan and Góngora—both of Cordoban descent — he deliberately translated the thought of the earlier poet into the vocabulary of the later master. This is possible; but it is at least as likely that Jáuregui unconsciously yielded to the current of popular taste, with no other intention than that of conciliating the public of his own day.

== Bibliography ==
- Rimas (1618) — A collection of lyrics.
- Discurso poético contra el hablar culto y oscuro (1624)
- Antídoto contra la pestilente poesía de las Soledades (1624)
- Apología de la verdad (1625)
- Orfeo (1624)
- Pharsalia (1684)

== See also ==
- List of famous Spanish Authors
- List of Spanish language poets
