= Convento de las Carmelitas Descalzas de San José, Toledo =

Monastic building in Toledo, Spain

Coordinates: 39.8596°N 4.0312°W

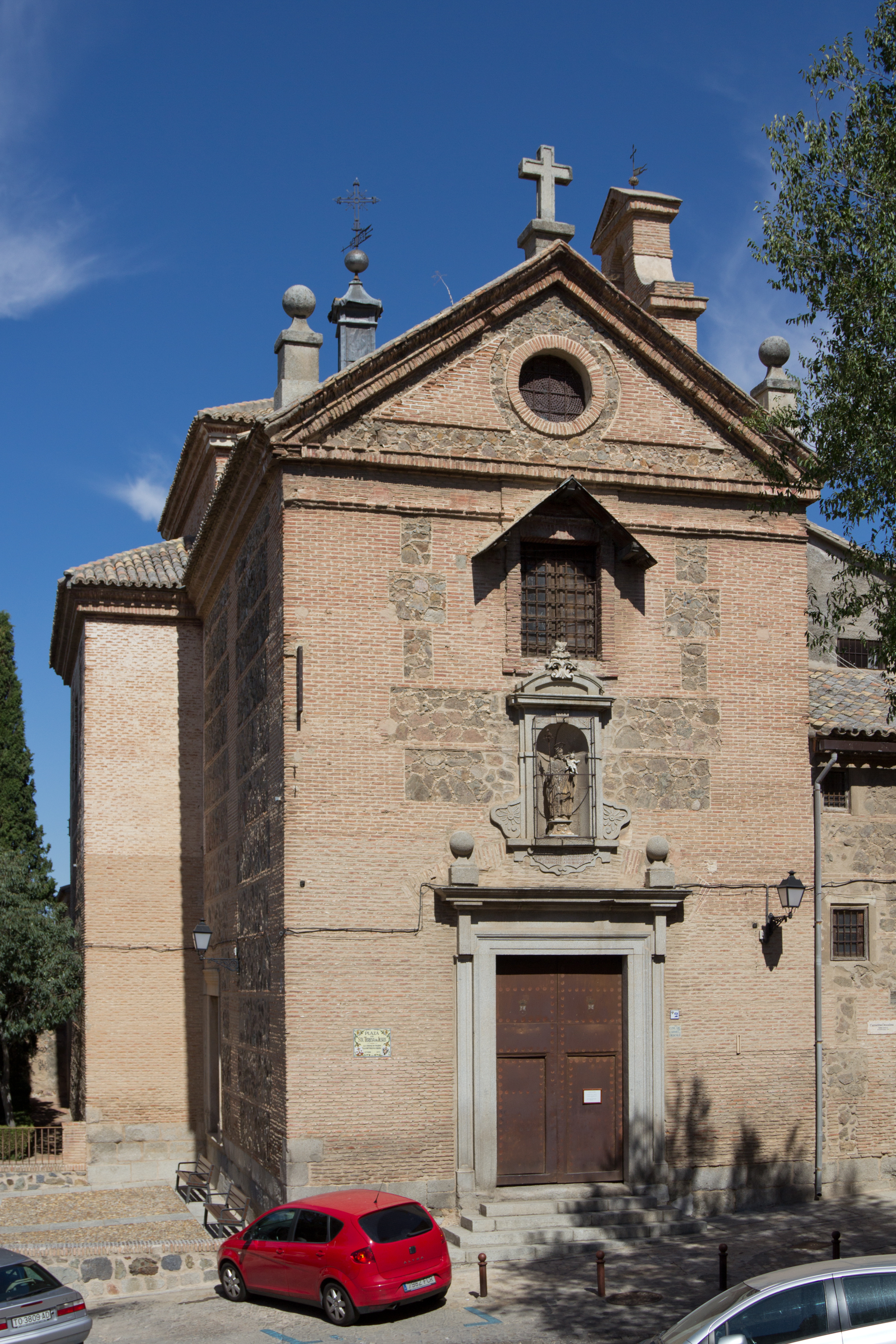
Convento de las Carmelitas Descalzas de San José

The Convento de las Carmelitas Descalzas de San José of Toledo (Castile-La Mancha, Spain) is a monastic building dating from the second half of the 16th century.

The Toledan community of Discalced Carmelites was founded by St. Teresa of Ávila herself, being the resting house of Saint Teresa in the city.

== History and description ==
In 1572 Don Fernando de la Cerda began the construction of a house in Toledo, attached to the walls of the city, raised on it its back facade, of marked Mannerist taste, with rustic ashlars. The works were interrupted on the death of Don Fernando, in 1579, disregarding his heirs of finishing the work and ending the count of Montalbán, grandson of that one, to sell to the nuns, in 1607, the half-built house.

The construction, due to Don Fernando de la Cerda, constitutes the most interesting nucleus, architecturally speaking, of what are the conventual dependences, singularly what was courtyard of that house, with two of its sides raised, when they become to own to the Religious and that they complete; Especially the arrangement in it of a half-point arch that jumps between swollen spans, similar to that of the courtyard of the cathedral treasury.

The works of the convent church did not begin until 1626, and in 1640, the master of works and alarife of Toledo, Diego Benavides, and the master of masonry, Lucas del Valle, contracted the realization of the decorative yeserias of the church, being carried out, the following year, of the work of the collateral chapel of the presbytery, of the side of the gospel.
