= Convent of the Barefoot Trinitarians =

- Convento de las Monjas Trinitarias Descalzas (Spanish)
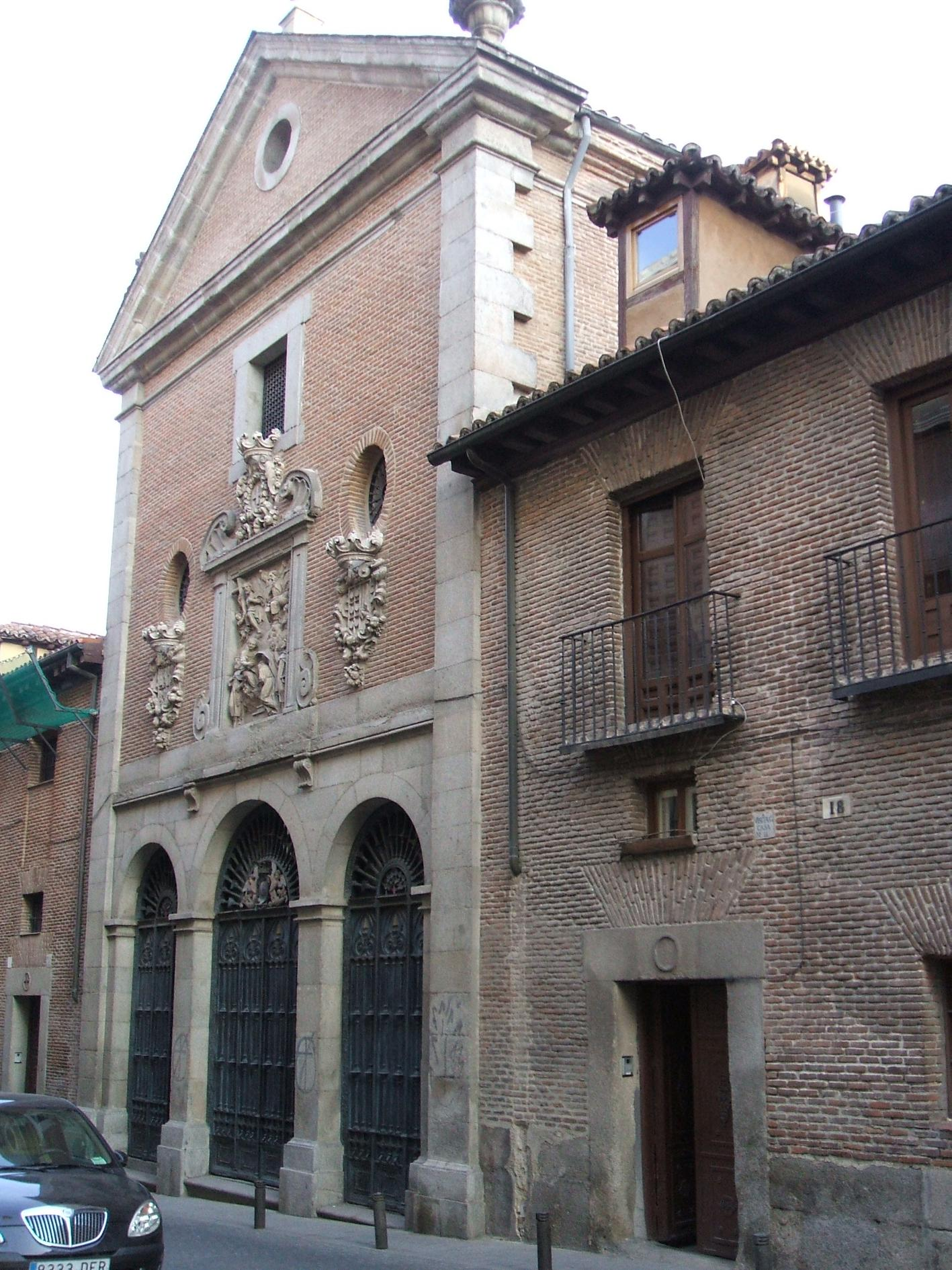

- Location within Spain
- 40.413674°N 3.697037°W
- Location: Madrid, Spain

Spanish Cultural Heritage
- Official name: Convento de las Monjas Trinitarias Descalzas
- Type: Non-movable
- Criteria: Monument
- Designated: 1943
- Reference no.: RI-51-0000199

The Convent of the Barefoot Trinitarians (Spanish: Convento de las Monjas Trinitarias Descalzas) is a convent located in Madrid, Spain.

The writer Miguel de Cervantes was buried at the convent in 1616. His remains were temporarily transferred elsewhere in 1673 during a reconstruction and were lost until forensic scientists discovered them in 2015.
