= Esquivias =

Coordinates: 40°06′N 3°46′W

- municipality
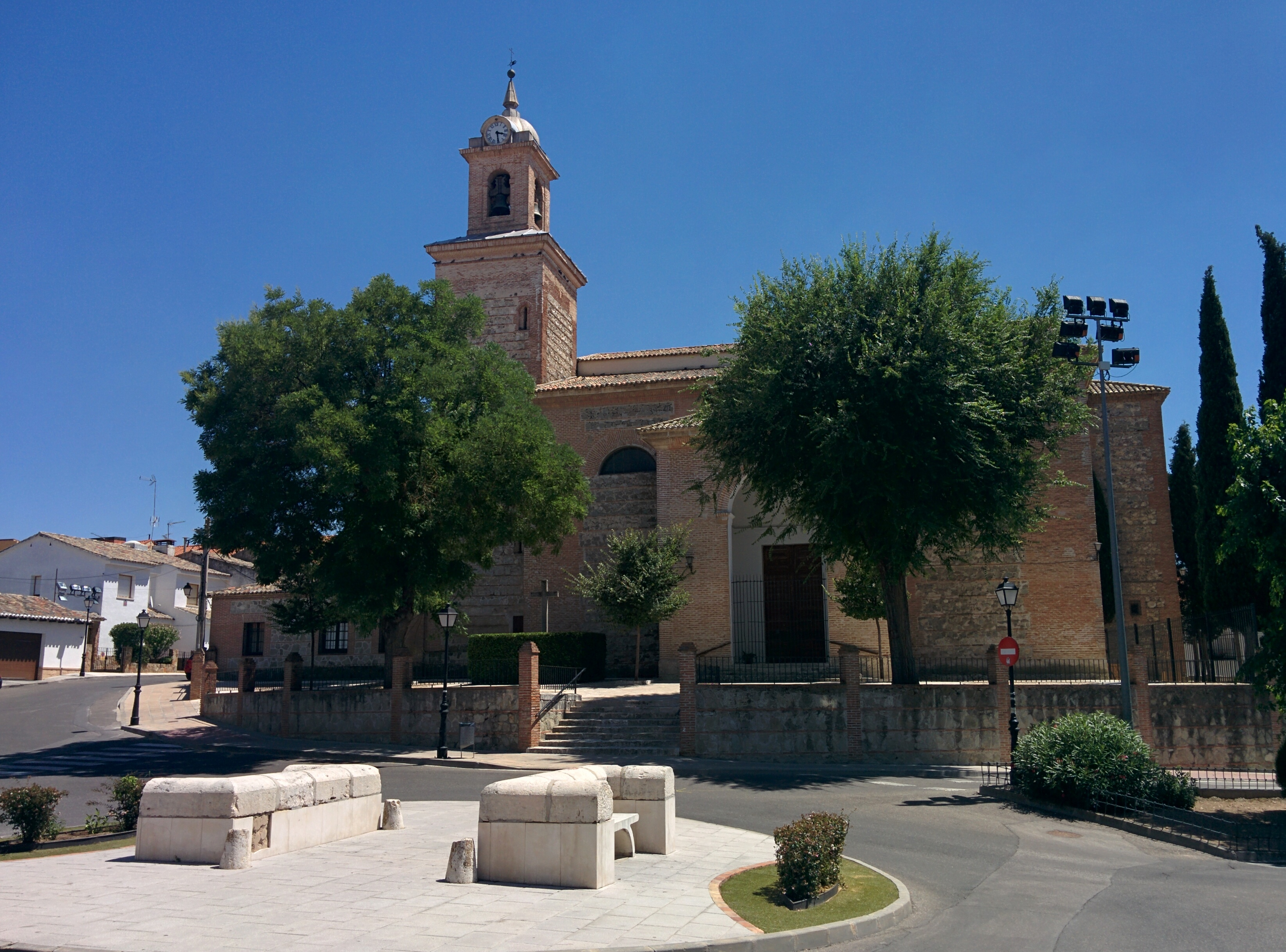
- Church of Our Lady of the Assumption, in Esquivias (Toledo, Spain).

- Coat of arms
- Interactive map of Esquivias
- Country: Spain
- Autonomous community: Castile-La Mancha
- Province: Toledo
- Municipality: Esquivias

Area
  - Total: 25 km^{2} (9.7 sq mi)
- Elevation: 580 m (1,900 ft)

Population (2025-01-01)
  - Total: 5,833
  - Density: 230/km^{2} (600/sq mi)
- Time zone: UTC+1 (CET)
  - Summer (DST): UTC+2 (CEST)

Esquivias is a municipality located in the province of Toledo, Castile-La Mancha, Spain. According to the 2006 census (INE), the municipality has a population of 4,812 inhabitants.

The author Cervantes lived here after marrying Catalina, a girl from the village, in 1584.

== Demographics ==
Historical population
Year	Pop.	±%
1900	1,456	—
1910	1,644	+12.9%
1920	1,990	+21.0%
1930	2,257	+13.4%
1940	2,182	−3.3%
1950	2,418	+10.8%
1960	2,539	+5.0%
1970	2,731	+7.6%
1981	3,116	+14.1%
1991	3,428	+10.0%
2001	3,848	+12.3%
2011	5,474	+42.3%
2021	5,747	+5.0%
2023	5,778	+0.5%
Source: ISTAT
