= Abramo Colorni =

Italian-Jewish polymath (1544–1599)

- Born: c. 1544; Mantua
- Died: 1599; Mantua
- Occupations: Engineer, architect, author, inventor

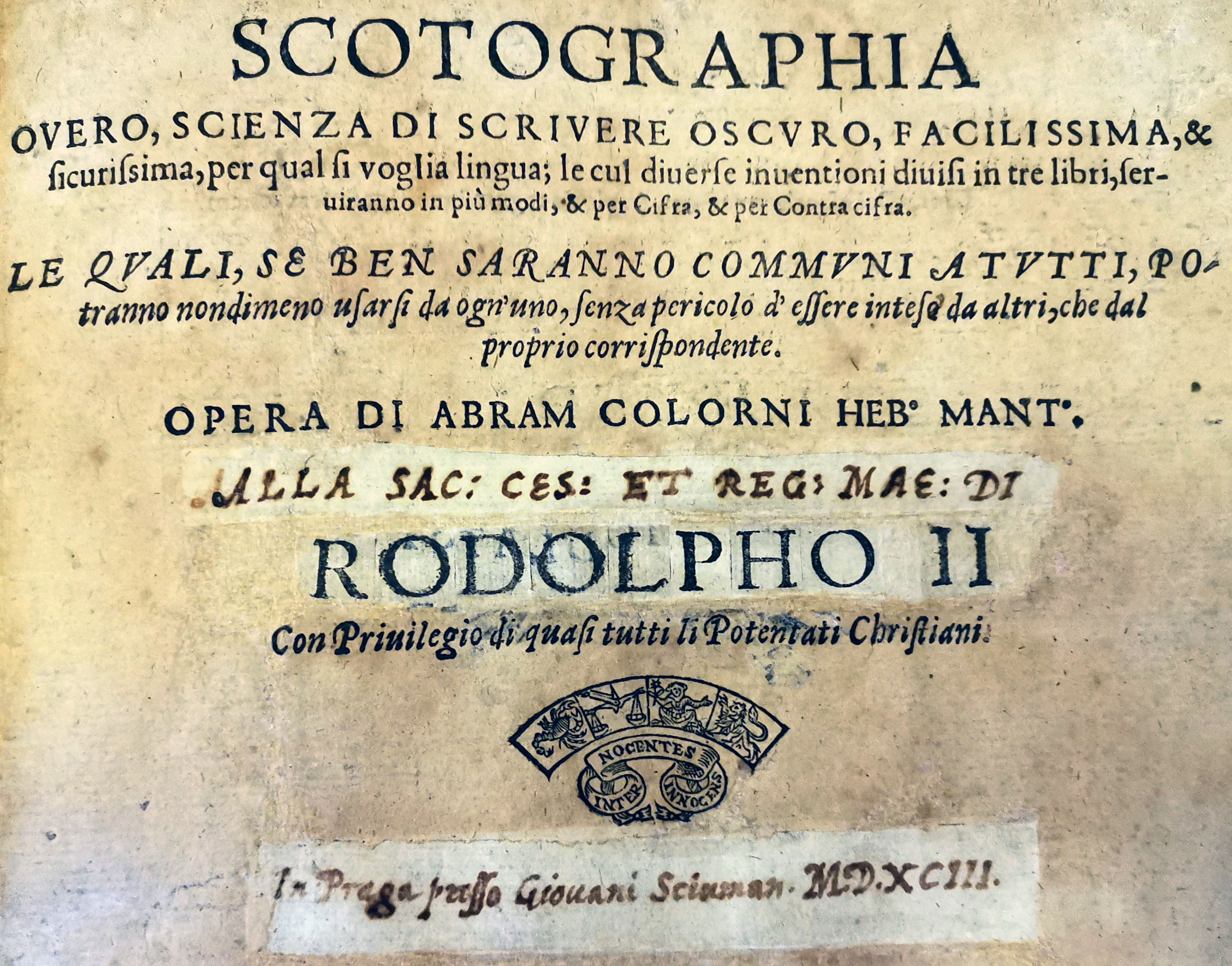
1593, Scotographia, published in Prague, collection of Biblioteca Teresiana

Abramo Colorni (Abram or Abraham, Colorno or Calorno, sometimes Colorini, c. 1544–1599) was an Italian-Jewish polymath and Renaissance man. An engineer, architect, mathematician, chiromancer, cryptographer, alchemist, inventor, magus (magician) and merchant, Colorni spent nine years as a Court Jew for Rudolf II. He is the author of the 1593 treatise on cryptography, Scotographia. As court alchemist, he was a major player in cultural transfer from Italy to Baden-Wurttemberg and Prague. He was born in, and died in, Mantua, Italy.

Sometimes thought of as a charlatan, a genius "Jewish Leonardo" or "Jewish Baron von Munchhausen", or a professore de’ secreti, "professor of secrets", he was also known as a clockmaker, for his magic tricks and escapology, and invented a new kind of revolver.

== Biography ==
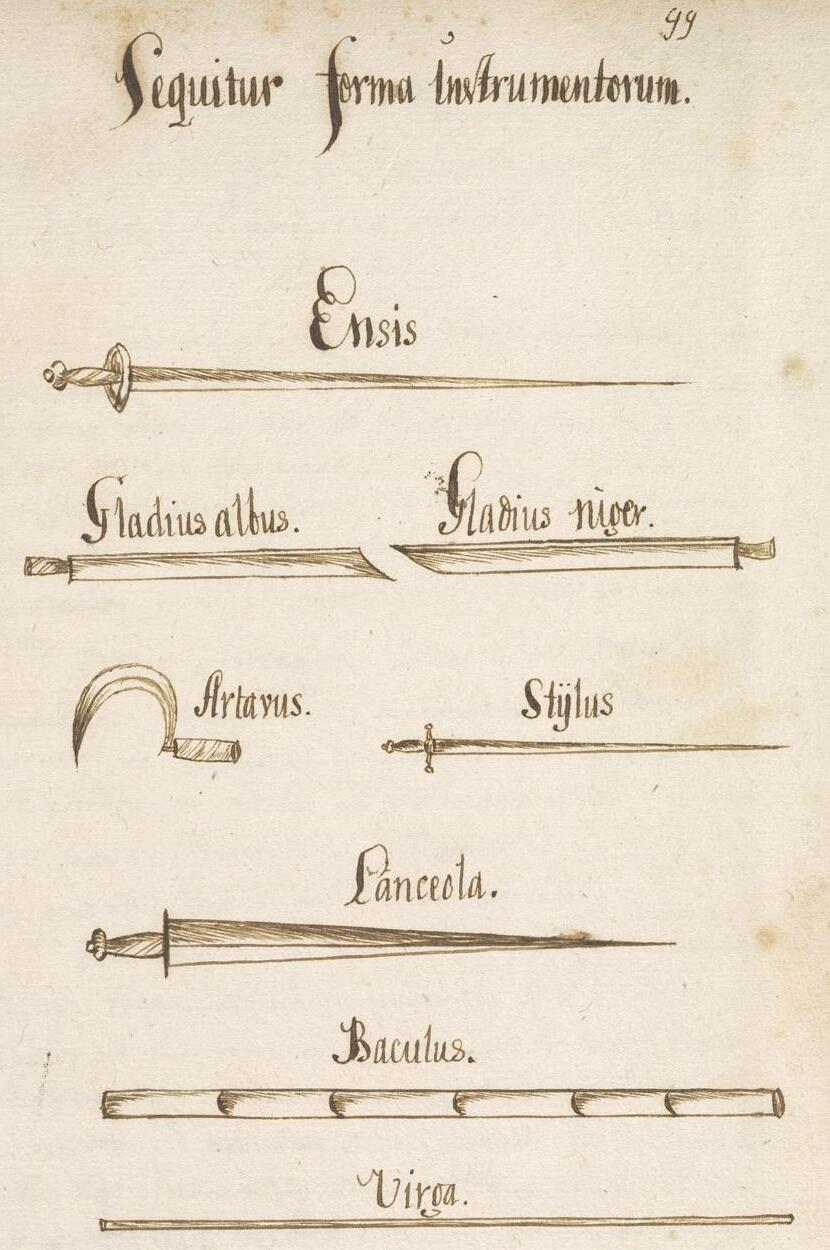
From an 18th-century copy of Clavicula Salomonis, the use of knives, swords, and wands

A devout Jew whose ancestors migrated from Germanic lands to Italy, Colorni was described as a Jewish Daedalus by his Christian and Jewish contemporaries and admired as one of the most famous and prominent Italians by Tomaso Garzoni. He was also praised by the poet Alessandro Tassoni. Jacopo Gaddi and Francesco Rovai composed baroque eulogies about Colorni, and he also was cited by Rafael Mirami.

Colorni attended the University of Ferrara where he studied under Antonio Maria Parolini, and was proficient in Latin. Known as a remarkable fencer, he was fascinated with weapons, and was hired in 1572 to design arms for the noble Italian Gonzaga family, rulers of his hometown Mantua, and in 1579 by the Este court in Ferrara. He accepted employment as a master engineer for the dukes of Ferrara. Contemporary Christians considered Colorni's education "well-rounded" and he likely had Christian as well as Jewish teachers. From the 1570s during the time that Colorni was at the ducal court, Jews were banned in most of Italy, and Ferrara was the only Christian city to allow "the apostasy of baptized persons," allowing a population of about 2,000 Jews or almost 10% of the city population.

Colorni married his first wife Violante, the daughter of Yechiel Nissim da Pisa, a highly respected moneylender and scholar, in 1577, and had two children: a son Simone, who continued his father's work, and daughter Colomba, who married a moneylender named Gabriele Fattorino, who died young, and had four children.

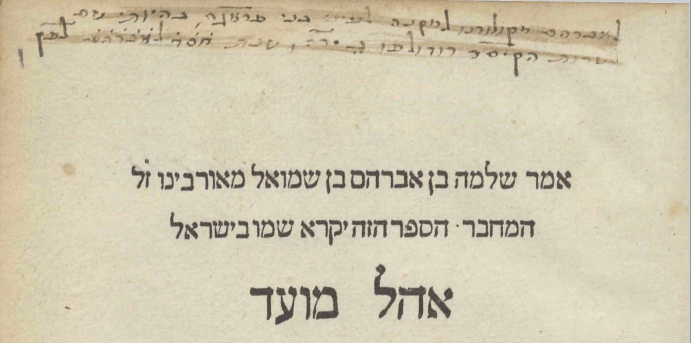
Šelomoh b. Avraham b. Šemuʼel, of Urbino, Ohel Mo‘ed, Venice 1548; title page. (Kaufmann B 33) Hebrew cursive purchase note, Abramo Colorni, in Prague in 1590, top.

In his works Piazza universale, La sinagoga and Il serraglio, Garzoni recounts Colorni's fame and feats of stage magic and sleight of hand, such as impressing audiences with illusions of transforming nuts into jewels and pearls, gold necklaces into live snakes, making painted animals appear to move, and card tricks, including a "Rising Card" trick. Abraham Yagel, a physician, scholar, and contemporary of Colorni's, also admired his skills with playing cards, which historian Daniel Jütte believes may have been inspired by or learned from Girolamo Scotto. Colorni also dabbled in escape artistry, and at the behest of his patron Vincenzo Gonzaga, so-called black or Solomonic magic. He also served as a technical advisor to the theater in the Mantuan court.

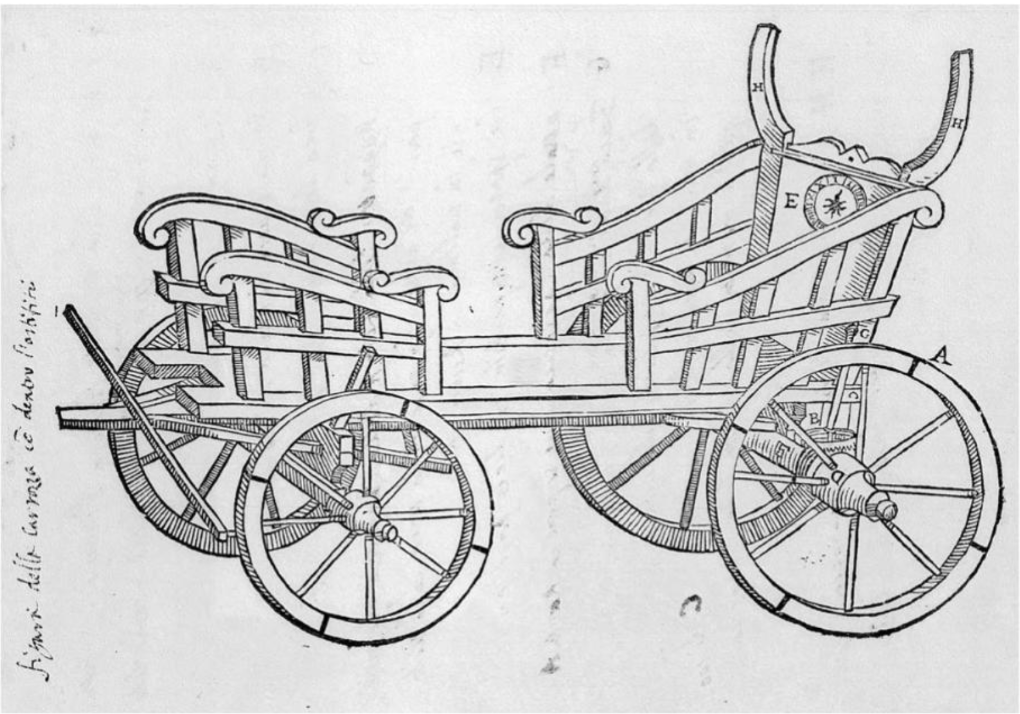
Colorni's carriage with odometer, from Euthimetria, Herzog August Library

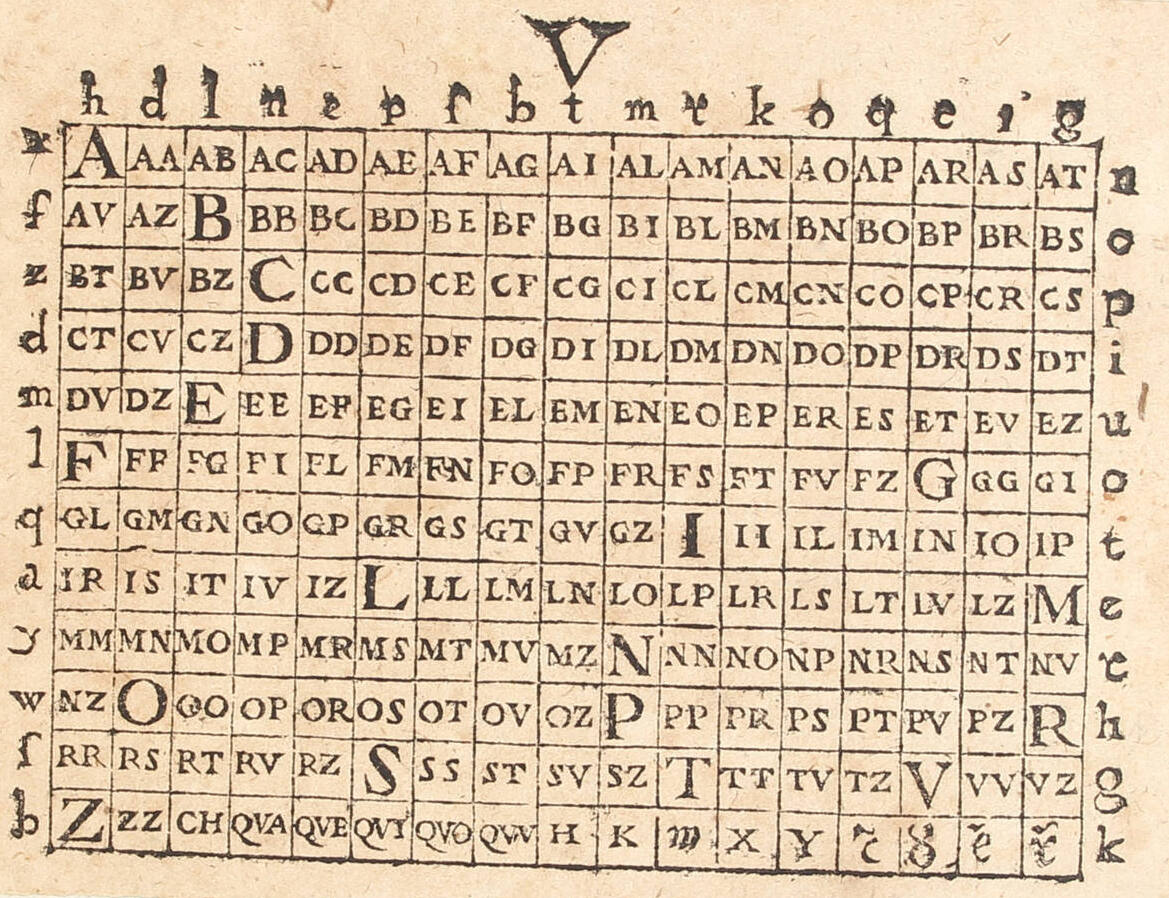
table from Scotographia, 1593

He resided in Mantua until 1588 when he moved to Prague, the power center of the Holy Roman Empire, invited by Emperor Rudolf, a known patron of engineers, scientists and artists. His help was sought to free Archduke Maximilian, Rudolf's brother, who was arrested by Sigismund Vasa in a 1588 dispute over the Polish crown. After going to Prague he was engaged in "practical alchemy" and the production of saltpeter. He also sourced jewelry for Rudolf, and constructed a sundial and a box of "magic mirrors". His work on developing cryptographic ciphers shows his familiarity with contemporary cryptographic literature such as Steganographia as well as ancient methods. His Scotographia is also called the "dark treatise". He later returned to the court of Alfonso II d'Este, who sent him to the duchy of Wurttemberg in 1597. Alfonso died in 1597 leading to the breakup of the Este Territory.

In Württemberg, Colorni encountered anti-Jewish sentiment. Jews had not been allowed to settle there since the 1490s, a leading Protestant territory known as "Lutheran Spain". He was referred to by the court preacher and the university professors as an "evil-minded magician", although his main activities were in sourcing weapons and luxury goods, such as musical instruments; for example, he sent instruments to the court in Mantua for use by Claudio Monteverdi.

Colorni worked with Maggino Gabrielli, a Venetian Jewish entrepreneur who had worked in Florence and Rome, to establish an "Oriental Trade Company" in Wurttemberg. Gabrielli had experience in the textile and spice trade, moneylending, and the glass industry, as well as alchemy, and planned to create a trade network with the Levant, seeking an entrepôt in the Holy Roman Empire. He began working with Colorni in the 1580s, who invited him to the court, but their plans failed, largely due to anti-Jewish polemics. A coalition between the Church, the Estates, and the city magistrates, fearing a rise in Jewish settlement, invoked a blood libel and withdrew the Oriental Trade Company's branch rights in Stuttgart, the capital and where Colorni was residing.

After Colorni's position at Wurttemberg eroded, he found himself under surveillance by the Frederick I, Duke of Württemberg's armed guards to prevent him from leaving. After he fled, the duke sent envoys throughout the Holy Roman Empire and Italy to locate him, but was unable to capture him. If caught, he likely would have faced a death sentence. His departure, in 1599, with 4000 gulden was met with extradition attempts by Stuttgart, and for his son after his death, that failed due to the protection of Mantua.

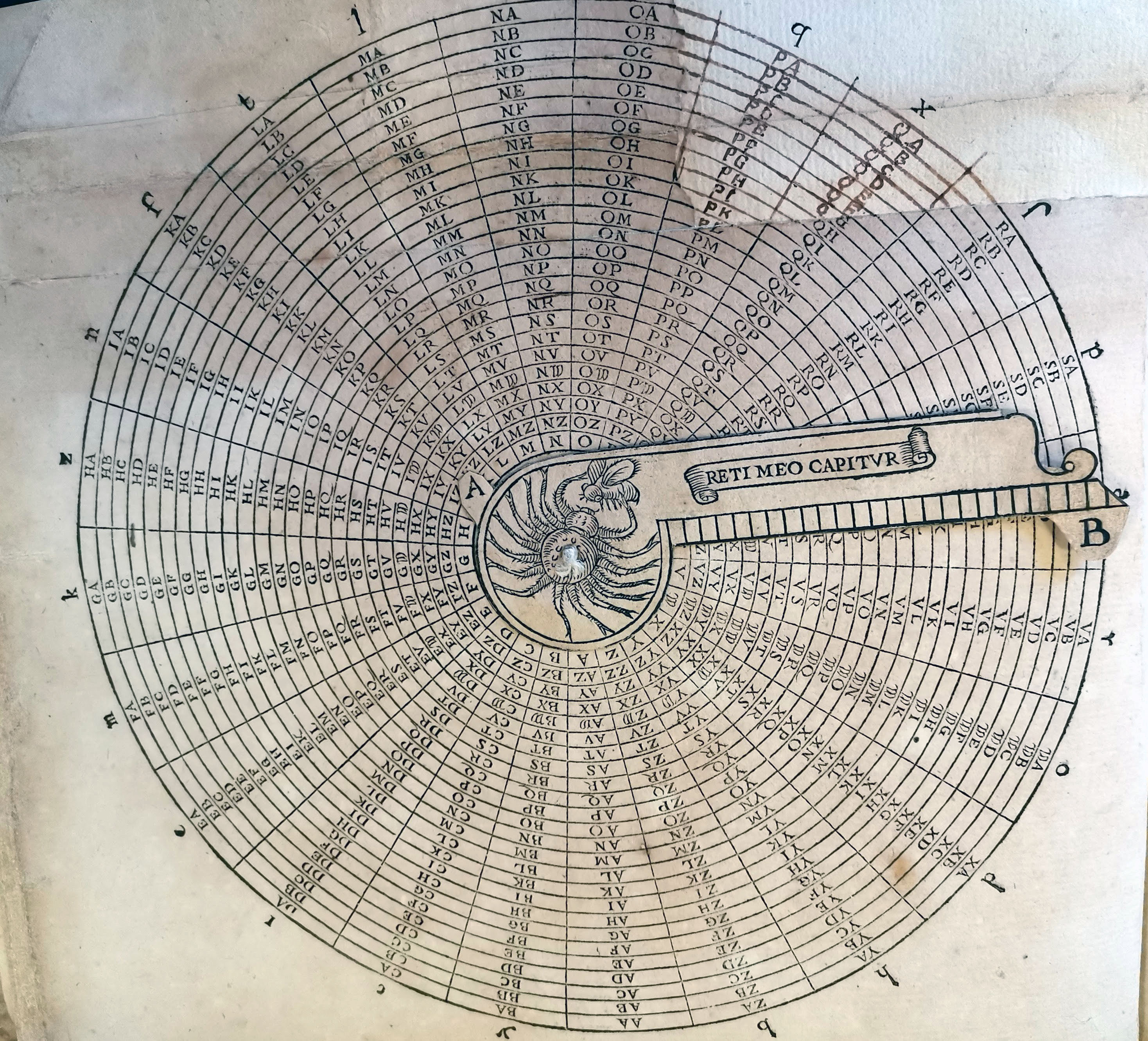
Cipher wheel from Scotographia, spider in center trapping insect reading "RETI MEO CAPITVR," (in my net he is caught) "and he will be caught in my snare," a reference to Ezekiel 17:20, Biblioteca Teresiana

Similar to his peer and follower Giambattista della Porta, his work attacked superstition while advocating a systematic natural science, invoking King Solomon, popularly thought of as a holder of secret knowledge. Colorni is also compared to Leonardo Fioravanti or Johann Joachim Becher. Daniel Jütte believes the reference to scotographia in James Joyce's Ulysses might indicate a familiarity with Colorni's works, based on Joyce's time in Italy and his use of Jewish renaissance mysticism as inspiration for his work. Colorni also devised a "small volvelle for enigmatic writing" or a type of cipher wheel. His cryptographic methods were intended to be universal, and made use of Roman letters that were not in the Italian alphabet at the time, such as K, W, X, and Y. Colorni's polyalphabetic substitution ciphers particularly appealed to Augustus II, Duke of Brunswick, who allotted Colorni the 2nd most space after Trithemius in his 1624 compendium Cryptomenytices.

Colorni died of a fever in Mantua in 1599, though Jütte considers the possibility he may have been poisoned as an open question. His son Simone took up several aspects of his father's work.

== Publications ==
- Colorni, Abramo (1593). Scotographia. Prague: Johannes Schuman. Published separately in Italian and Latin, and separately in large- and small-format editions. Only the Italian editions are dated. The large editions (22x17cm) were designed for European princes, and the small (12x7cm) were to be used by court officials for the actual decipherment of codes. Scans: Latin small, Latin large, Italian small, Italian large.

== Manuscript works ==
- Colorni, Abraham (c. 1750) [1580]. Clavicula Salomonis Regis: ex idiomate Haebreo versa (in Latin). Apparently translation of the Hebrew Sefer Mafteah Shelomoh (Book of the Key of Solomon) at the request of the Duke of Mantua. Manuscript versions of this work exist in Latin, French, Italian, Greek, Hebrew, and Spanish. According to Jütte, this could possibly be an original work synthesized by Colorni and not a translation at all, with the Hebrew version being in fact a translation from Colorni's Latin or Italian versions. However, he believes it is not possible to conclusively determine the philological origin and nature of the work, since there are differences in the 17th and 18th French century manuscripts which claim to be based on Colorni. Robert Mathiesen believed the Greek version to be the original.
- Tavole Mathematiche (Mathematical Tables)
- Entimetria, rules for the measurement of straight lines
- Euthimetria, MS Wolfenbüttel, treatise on engineering
- Nova Chirofisionomia, 1588, Ferrara, in which he opposes superstitions such as palmistry

== Jewish Encyclopedia bibliography ==
- Rossi, Dizionario, p. 93;
- Tiraboschi, Storia Letteraria. vii. iii. 1319;
- Wolf, Bibl. Hebr. iv. 769, 976;
- Ravenna, in Vessillo Israelitico, 1892. pp. 38–41;
- Mortara, Indice, p. 14;
- Steinschneider, Cat. Bodl. col. 2298;
- idem, in Monatsschrift, 1899, p. 185 et seq.;
- idem, Hebräische Uebers. p. 938;
- Steinschneider, Moritz (31 October 2014). Mathematik bei den Juden (in German). Georg Olms Verlag. ISBN 978-3-487-13585-4.
- Giuseppe Jarè, Abramo Colorni : ingegnere i Alfonso II. d'Este; memoria letta nell' adunanza 30 marzo 1890 / nuove ricerche del G. Jarè. 1891. (pdf)
  - Jarè, Abramo Colorni : ingegnere Mantovano del secolo XVI.; con documenti ined. / cenni del Giuseppe Jarè. 1874. (pdf)
