= Rising Card =

Magical illusion

The Rising Card is a popular category of magical illusion in which the magician causes randomly selected playing cards to spontaneously rise from the center of a deck. Many variations of this trick exist and are widely performed. The effect can be accomplished using a variety of methods and techniques, ranging from pure sleight of hand to complex electronic and mechanical solutions.

== Variations ==
An early rising card trick, as described by Tommaso Garzoni, was performed by Abramo Colorni in the 16th century.

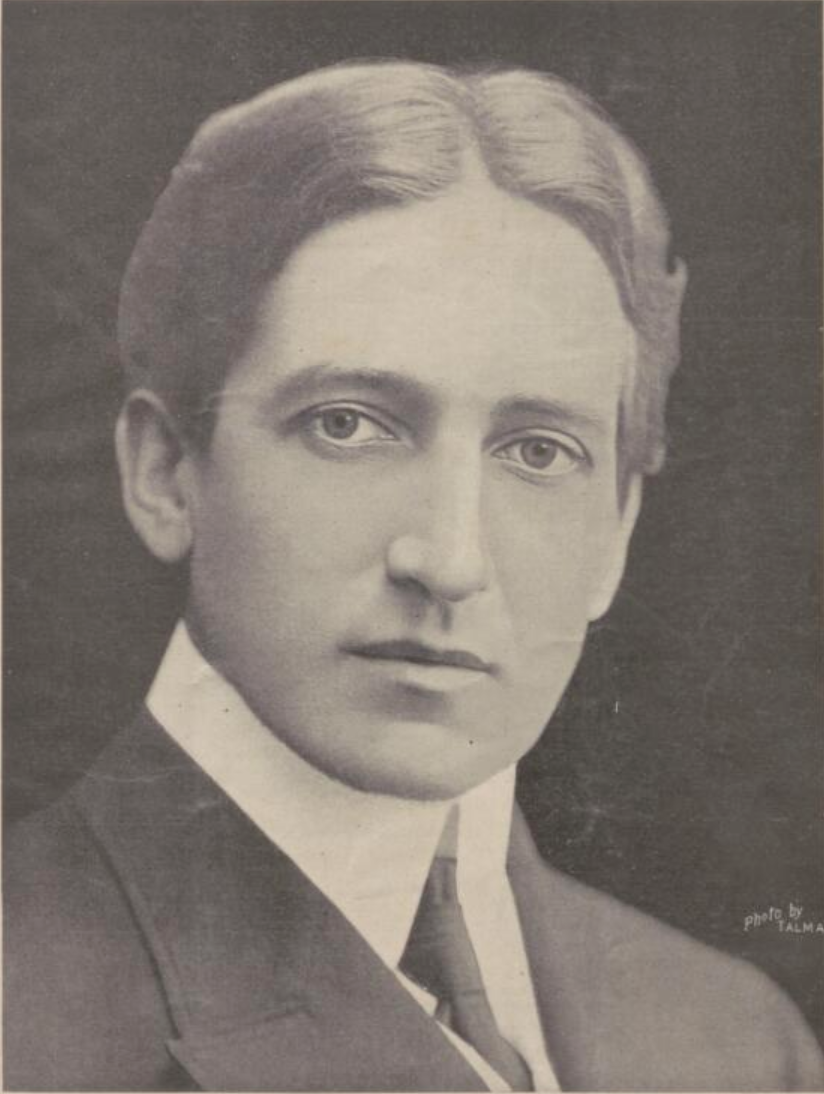
Magician Howard Thurston performed an innovative version of the Rising Card trick.

Magician Howard Thurston is attributed with creating a unique take on the Rising Card. As described by Smithsonian magazine:

One, called the "Rising Card," started with an audience member choosing certain cards, as if for a regular card trick. But expectations were turned upside down when Thurston put the deck into a glass goblet. He would then call up certain cards—the king of spades, the ten of clubs—and they would rise two feet in the air, into his hands. The dazzling end came when all 52 cards were thrown, serially, into the audience. One reporter wrote that they fluttered to audience members "like beautiful butterflies."

A similar variation is attributed to magician and inventor Samuel Cox Hooker. This version includes cards rising from the deck and floating in air beneath a glass bell jar. This complex, multi-stage iteration of the Rising Card effect was reenacted by John Gaughan in 2007 and has inspired curiosity and speculation as to the methods behind it.

In his Complete Encyclopedia of Magic, Joseph Dunninger shares a number of variations of the Rising Card effect, including ones where the deck of cards is held in the magician's hand, or placed in a wine glass on a table. Magician Jeff McBride developed a version of the Rising Card effect where the card rises while the deck is held by a spectator; entitled "Kundalini Rising," McBride's variation links the Rising Card effect to mythology- and religion-themed storytelling.

== Methods ==
Magicians accomplish the Rising Card effect using a variety of methodologies that include both sleight of hand techniques and mechanical solutions involving threads, weights, rubber rollers, elastics, adhesives, electronics, motors, and more.

Historic versions of the Rising Card in particular often involved complex mechanics and automation, similar to clock and watch-making technology, to accomplish the effect.

While some versions of the Rising Card involve complex equipment and carefully prepared decks, other variations can be accomplished using only special hand positions and an unaltered deck of cards.
