= The Padlock =

Opera by Charles Dibdin

- Opera by Charles Dibdin
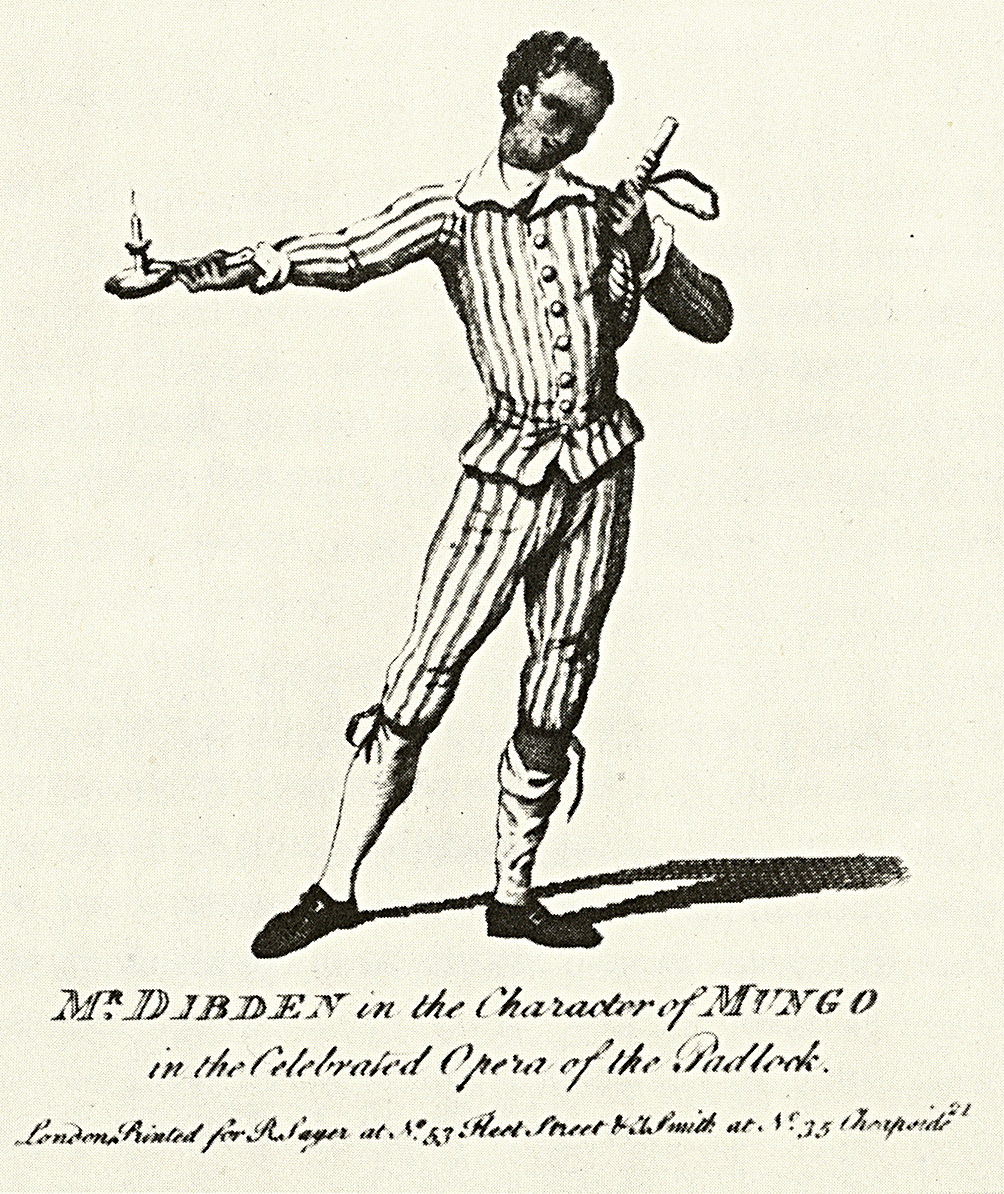
- The composer as Mungo
- Librettist: Isaac Bickerstaffe
- Language: English
- Based on: Cervantes' El celoso extremeño
- Premiere: 1768; Drury Lane Theatre, London

The Padlock is a two-act 'afterpiece' opera by the English composer and dramatist Charles Dibdin. The text was by Isaac Bickerstaffe. It debuted in 1768 at the Drury Lane Theatre in London as a companion piece to The Earl of Warwick. It partnered other plays before a run of six performances in tandem with The Fatal Discovery by John Home. "The Padlock" was a success, largely due to Dibdin's portrayal of Mungo, a blackface caricature of a black servant from the West Indies. The company took the production to the United States the next year, where a portrayal by Lewis Hallam, Jr. as Mungo met with even greater accolades. The libretto was first published in London around 1768 and in Dublin in 1775. The play remained in regular circulation in the U.S. as late as 1843. It was revived by the Old Vic Company in London and on tour in the UK in 1979 in a new orchestration by Don Fraser and played in a double-bill with Garrick's Miss In Her Teens. The role of Mungo was, again, played by a white actor. Opera Theatre of Chicago have recently revived the piece (2007?) where, it would seem, the role of Mungo was changed to that of an Irish servant.

== Story and music ==
Bickerstaffe's libretto, based on Miguel de Cervantes' El celoso extremeño (a work translated into English as The Jealous Husband; the title literally means "the jealous Extremaduran"), consists of normal dialogue with a few interludes of song. It tells the story of an old miser who keeps his fiancée behind the closed door of their home for fear that she will not be faithful to him (in Cervantes's version, the woman is his wife). The opera's title comes from the large padlock that the old man keeps on the cottage's door.

In contrast to Cervantes's miser-centred story, The Padlock is centred on the old man's servant, a black man named Mungo from the West Indies, who also provides a large part of the comedy. The part was played by a white man in blackface, making The Padlock an early example of this practice, but not the earliest as claimed by some sources. Mungo is a stereotype: a musical, heavy drinking, money-grubbing servant who speaks in an approximation of the black dialect of West Indies slaves. Mungo's master beats him with a rattan cane and makes him sing and dance on cue. The servant's pretense at being an opera singer constitutes the aria for Act 2. He is normally obsequious to whites, but in moments of drunkenness or solitude, he becomes impudent:

Dear heart, what a terrible life am I led!
A dog has a better, that's shelter'd and fed;

Night and day, 'tis de same,
My pain is dere game:

Me wish to de Lord me was dead.

Whate'ers to be done,
Poor blacky must run;
Mungo here, Mungo dere,
Mungo every where;
Above and below,
Sirrah, come; sirrah, go;
Do so, and do so.
Oh! oh!

Me wish to de Lord me was dead.

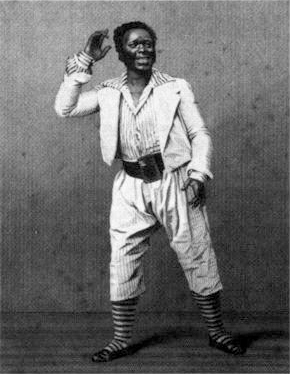
Ira Aldridge as Mungo in The Padlock

An actor named John Moody, who was supposed to have been familiar with the dialect of the blacks in the West Indies, was originally scheduled to play the part. However, in the end, Dibdin stood in for him. Audience reactions to Dibdin's performance were overwhelmingly positive, and in 1787, he spun his fame as Mungo into a one-man show wherein he sang, gave speeches, and did impressions of black people.

Ira Aldridge, one of the most famous actor of the nineteen century and the first Black American actor to play Othello on a British scene played the role of Mungo in a later production of the opera. During all his career, Ira Aldridge was an important advocate of the anti-slavery movement. Therefore, to sensitize the public to inhumanity and abjectness of enslavement, Aldridge has transformed the play. His portrayal of Mungo was totally different from the original play. He gave a more serious interpretation of this character. Aldridge added a new song to the operetta. At the end of the night addressed directly to the audience on a variety of social issues which affected the United States, Europe, and Africa. In particular, Aldridge spoke on his pro-abolitionist sentiments to his audience, which received such impassioned oration positively. Mungo was, with Othello, one of the two favorite roles of Aldridge and was one of Aldridge‘s most lauded roles by the public and the critiques. Aldridge tried to play both Othello (as the title character) and The Padlock on the same night to make the audience both think and laugh, show his acting talent and generate good publicity.

Dibdin's music shows heavy influence from Italian operatic traditions. In fact, one Italian composer, today unknown, accused Dibdin of stealing material from him. Dibdin thus used the preface of the published version of The Padlock to refute the claims. Although touted as a genuine depiction of a black character, Mungo's singing parts show no influence from African musical traditions.

There is an in-depth analysis of The Padlock; Mungo's character, speech, and dress; and the opera's popularity in the North American British colonies and the new United States in Monica L. Miller's Slaves to Fashion: Black Dandyism and the Styling of Black Diasporic Identity in her chapter "Mungo Macaroni," pp. 27-76 (bibliographic information in References below).

== Bibliography ==
- Cockrell, Dale (1997). Demons of Disorder: Early Blackface Minstrels and Their World. Cambridge University Press.
- Lindfors, Bernth (Summer 1999). "'Mislike me not for my complexion…': Ira Aldridge in whiteface". African American Review. 33 (2). Archived from the original on August 17, 2004 – via FindArticles.
- Mahar, William J. (1999). Behind the Burnt Cork Mask: Early Blackface Minstrelsy in Antebellum American Culture. Chicago: University of Illinois Press.
- Miller, Monica L. (2009). Slaves to Fashion: Black Dandyism and the Styling of Black Diasporic Identity. Durham: Duke University Press.
- Nathan, Hans (1962). Dan Emmett and the Rise of Early Negro Minstrelsy. Norman: University of Oklahoma Press.
- Scheytt, Jochen. "The Minstrel Show". Accessed 10 November 2005.
- Sussman, Charlotte (24 August 2000). Review of Kitson, Peter and Lee, Debbie, eds. Slavery, Abolition and Emancipation: Writings in the British Romantic Period. Accessed 10 November 2005.
