= María Luisa Algarra =

Spanish playwright (1916–1957)

María Luisa Algarra (1916 in Barcelona – 1957 in Mexico City) was a Spanish playwright who lived and wrote in exile in Mexico after the Spanish Civil War and World War II. She was also the first female judge in Spain.

== Life ==
María Luisa Algarra “was educated first at local schools, then studied at the University Autonomous of Barcelona. In June 1936, at age twenty, she received her law degree, a rather uncommon occurrence for a woman at the time.”

She was appointed judge on 2 December 1936 by the Justice Counsellor Andreu Nin.

She emigrated to France at the end of the Spanish Civil War (1936–1939). There she aided the resistance movement during the Second World War, an effort that resulted in her three-year internment in the Vernet concentration camp. Upon her release, she left Europe to permanently live in Mexico where she met José Reyes Mesa, the famous painter, whom she married and with whom she had two daughters, Reyes and Fernanda. She had a close friendship with a fellow playwright, the Mexican Emilio Carballido, who described Algarra as “asombrosa…atractiva…alta, altísima” (astonishing…attractive…tall, very tall). She died in 1957 at the age of 41.

== Work ==
Algarra was best known as a playwright, although she also wrote movie and television scripts and radio novels (arguably having most financial success in the film industry). As well as her original work, she also wrote theatre adaptations of Cervantes’ La Cueva de Salamanca and Juan Ruiz’ La verdad sospechosa. While many of her plays were produced during her lifetime, her texts were not published until after her death. Individual plays were featured in a variety of theatre publications, and a complete anthology was published by Universidad Veracruz, a Mexican Publishing House, in 2008. Her plays often feature a female protagonist and treat a variety of themes, including the situation of women in society, familial conflict, friendship, exile, and love, and Algarra treats many of these concepts from a psychological perspective. Some of her works deal with issues specific to Mexico or her own experience in exile, while others feature universally-applicable issues.

== Reception ==
Algarra’s plays were generally well received by her contemporaries. In 1935 she received the Concursal Teatral Universitario award from the Universidad Autónoma in Barcelona for her first play, Judith, which was written in Catalan, and in 1954 she earned the “máximo reconocimento en el teatro mexicano” (the maximum recognition in Mexican theatre) when she won the award at the Concurso de Grupos Teatrales del Distrito Federal (Mexico City Theatre Conference) for her play Los años de prueba. It is of note that the aforementioned prize is awarded to a play that should be “de autor mexicano, escrita con posterioridad al año 1917, y tratar un problema mexicano” (by a Mexican author, written after 1917, and about a Mexican problem). Los años de prueba also won the INBA and Juan Ruiz de Alarcon awards, the latter for the best play of 1954.

Her work has not been the focus of a great amount of literary criticism, but recently has garnered slightly increased attention. Carballido, in his prologue to Algarra’s complete works anthology affirms that “las obras de teatro…siguen brillantes y actuales” (the plays continue to be brilliant and currently relevant); while other critics are not quite as complimentary. In the Algarra entry in the reference book Teatro español [de la A a la Z], by Javier Huerta Clavo, Emilio Peral Vega and Hector Urzáiz Tortajada, several of her plays are mentioned, and then the authors refer to “[t]ítulos posteriores…donde insiste en sus ideas antiburguesas y revolucionarias con un plantamiento formal demasiado maniqueo y discursivo” (later titles where [Algarra] insists on her anti-bourgeois and revolutionary ideas with an overly manichaeistic and overly discursive formal approach). Juan Pablo Heras González takes a more balanced approach, praising “el ingenio de sus diálogos” (the ingenuity of her dialogues) and “la densidad psicológica” (the psychological density) of the characters but also concedes that “ninguna de sus obras alcanza la perfección” (none of her works achieves perfection). He laments that Algarra died when “lo mejor de su obra estaba por llegar” (the best of her work was yet to come) and claims that “logró una presencia escénica en México muy superior, que hubiera constituido una de las mayores influencias del exilio teatral español en México, de no haberse interrumpido tan pronto su vida” (she achieved a superior stage presence in Mexico that would have constituted one of the greatest influences on Spanish theatre of exile in Mexico had her life not been interrupted so early).

== Published plays ==
- Judith (1936)
- Primavera inútil (1944)
- Sombra de alas (late 1940s)
- Una passion violenta (early 1950s)
- Casandra o la llave sin puerta (1953)
- Los años de prueba (1954)

== Movie scripts ==
- Échame la culpa (1959) (story)
- La venenosa (1959) (writer)
- Amor se dice cantando (1959) (screenplay) (story)
- Los santos reyes (1959) (story)
- Aladino y la lámpara maravillosa (1958) (writer) ... aka Aladdin and the Marvelous Lamp International: English title)
- Las mil y una noches (1958) (dialogue) ... aka A Thousand and One Nights (International: English title)
- Refifí entre las mujeres (1958) (story) (as Ma. Luisa Algarra)
- Escuela para suegras (1958) (story) ... aka School for Mothers-in-Law (International: English title)
- La sombra del otro (1957) (dialogue)
- La mujer marcada (1957) (story)
- Mal de amores (Rogaciano el huapanguero) (1957) (additional dialogue)
- Que me toquen las golondrinas (1957) (writer) ... aka La despedida (Argentina)
- Las aventuras de Pito Pérez (1957) (additional dialogue) ... aka The Adventures of Pito Perez (International: English title)
- Tú y las nubes (1955) (story) ... aka Limosna de amores (Spain)
- Nosotros dos (1955) (screenplay) (story) ... aka We Two (International: English title)
- La posesión (1950) (writer)
- Encadenada (El yugo) (1947) (additional dialogue) ... aka Encadenado (Mexico)
