= Rinconete y Cortadillo =

- Short story by Miguel de Cervantes
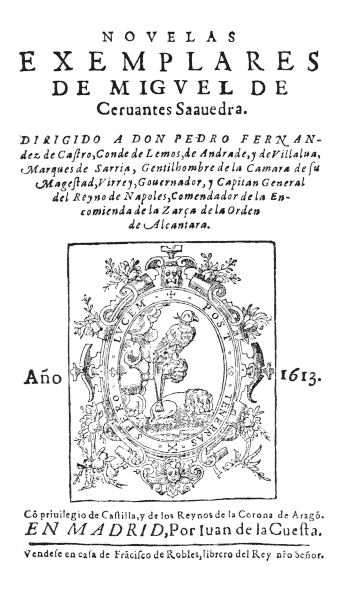
- 1613 book cover
- Original title: Novela de Rinconete y Cortadillo
- Country: Spain
- Language: Spanish
- Genre: Picaresque short story

Publication
- Published in: Novelas Ejemplares
- Publication date: 1613

Chronology
El amante liberal	La española inglesa

"Rinconete y Cortadillo" (or "Novela de Rinconete y Cortadillo") is one of the twelve short stories included in Novelas Ejemplares, by Spanish writer Miguel de Cervantes. It describes the comical adventures of two petty criminals as they travel to Seville and are then taken in by the city's thieves' guild. Seville at the time was a rich city with marked social contrasts, being the entrepôt of Spain and the new world of the Americas.

== Plot ==
Two young men, Rincón and Cortado, meet at a roadside inn. They boastfully share stories of robbing and cheating fellow travelers that make it clear that they are both pícaros—wandering petty criminals—and agree to continue on together. They travel to Seville, where their petty crimes bring them to the attention of the city's thieves' guild. Rincón and Cortado are taken in by the guild, and in the second half of the story, they observe its comical organization and antics under its leader, Monipodio. As a sign of the pair's absorption into the syndicate, Monipodio gives them the affectionate nicknames of the story's title, Rinconete y Cortadillo.

== History and authorship ==
In the words of Cervantes scholar Juergen Hahn, "the issue of the Rinconete's authorship has been a sensitive one ever since ... 1788", when a copy of the story was found that was attributed to Cervantes' contemporary Licenciado Porras de la Camara. Cervantes refers to the story by name in Don Quixote Book I, published in 1605, and metafictionally attributes the story to himself. However, the actual story was apparently not published until 1613, eight years later. In the 1980s and '90s, scholar E. T. Aylward argued that "Rinconete" and "El celoso extremeño" were both plagiarized by Cervantes. These arguments were largely debunked by later analysis by philologist Geoffrey Stagg, whose work cast serious doubt on the authenticity of the Porras manuscript.

Hahn theorizes that Cervantes originally intended "Rinconete" as a tale-within-a-tale to be included in the Quixote itself, in the position that "El curioso impertinente" instead holds.

== Analysis ==
English translator Lesley Lipson describes "Rinconete y Cortadillo" as a story with "scant plot and little action," in which the primary appeal is the satire found in the thieves' guild quasi-religious rites. Despite their bad behavior, the eponymous pícaros and the thieves' guild members are portrayed with humor and detachment, rather than the moral judgment often found in other works of Cervantes' day.

Critic Edward H. Friedman observes that the story uses travel as a metaphor for learning, as the title pair first teach one another new criminal tricks on the road and then, at Seville, enter the slightly more formal tutelage of the thieves' guild. Friendman reads the story as anti-picaresque rather than picaresque, as the protagonists remain somewhat aloof from the guild, mocking them, even as they nominally become members. Robert M. Johnston also notes important departures from the picaresque genre, such as Rincón and Cordato's loyal friendship (in contrast to the isolation and cynicism typical of the genre) and the sense of progress and destiny in the story's escalating events (in contrast to the chaos and apparent randomness of a typical picaresque). Johnston argues that Cervantes instead draws on several genres—picaresque, romance, and the pastoral—to create a "polyphonic" tale of greater richness.
