= Synagogue of Pisa =

Synagogue in Pisa

- Sinagoga di Pisa
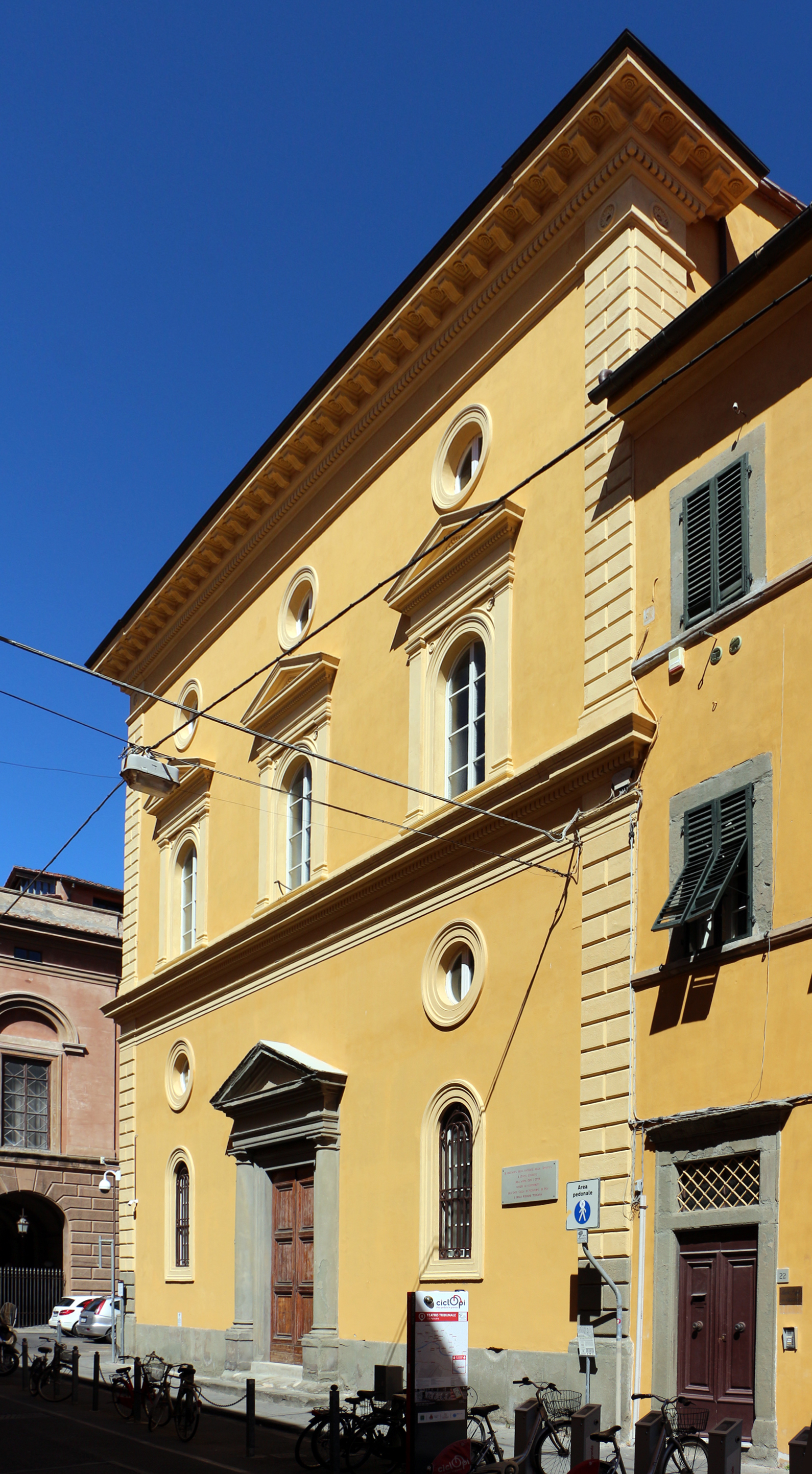
- Facade of the building

Religion
- Affiliation: Judaism
- Rite: Spanish rite

Location
- Location: Pisa, Tuscany, Italy
- Interactive map of Synagogue of Pisa
- Coordinates: 43°42′59″N 10°24′17″E

Architecture
- Architect: Marco Treves
- Style: Italianate
- Completed: 14th century (building); 1785 (restoration); 1863 (major renovation)

The Synagogue of Pisa (Italian: Sinagoga di Pisa) is a 16th-century Jewish synagogue located in Pisa, Italy. It is located on Via Palestro 24, and contains many historic Jewish objects, including a Torah ark dating to the 16th century, and a parochet dating to 1470.

== History ==
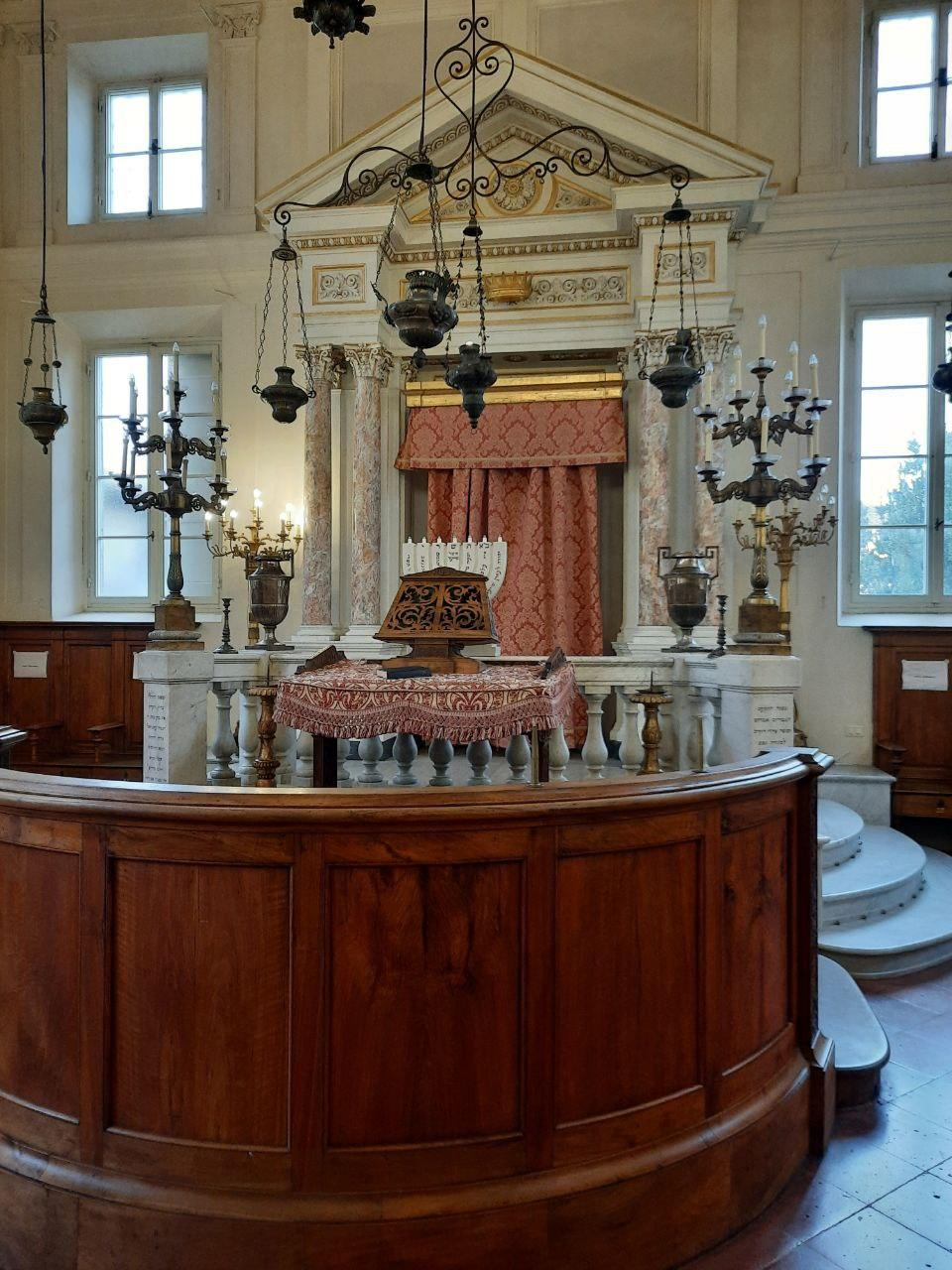
Interior of the synagogue

The synagogue's building dates back to the 14th century, and was converted to a place of worship in 1595. Prior to the move, the congregation worshiped for a few years in a home in Lungarno Galileo neighborhood. The congregation transferred a Torah scroll to the synagogue in the Florentine Ghetto after Jews were forced to flee following the creation of the Grand Duchy of Tuscany, and later under Maggino Gabrielli, the Consul-elect of the Jews in Pisa at the time, orders were made to extract the Torah from its cabinet. It was also used for worship by the Jews in the city of Livorno until they had their own place to worship in 1598.

The synagogue was restored in 1785, when it had been nearly 2 centuries since its conversion to a synagogue. In 1816, records indicate Sara Nunez de Paz dedicated 200 bits of 8 reales to the maintenance of the lamp (presumably the candelabra) in the synagogue.

Pisa's synagogue was completely renovated to its current style in 1863 by Jewish-Vercellese architect Marco Treves. The facade was redone with a central door, rounded windows, oval windows, and triangular tympanum. It also had a mikveh and Kosher slaughterhouse connected to it, which are no longer present. The interior was redone as well, while maintaining the same general indoor frame. It contains a large square hall, with a women's section protruding from the entrance and stucco walls. The bimah is made of wood with a railing and turned balustrades. The Torah ark is made of marble and is flanked on both sides by pairs of columns with Corinthian capitals and a triangular tympanum. Prominent Italian-Jewish activist Umberto Nahon (1905–1974) donated several pews in honor of Lady Judith Montefiore, as he was the great-grandson of Moise Haim Racah, an attendant of that synagogue in the 19th century.

In the 1990s, the congregation partnered with the University of Pisa to host a conference on the history of the Jews in the city.

In 2007, the building was severely damaged as a result of a thunderstorm, with lightning destroying the roof. The synagogue was unusuable for around eight years. While repairs were still being planned, the front of the synagogue was defaced with red paint on January 12, 2009 during the nighttime. Police in the city stated that the motive behind the vandalism was found to have been in response to political tension between Israel and Gaza. The grand reopening was held on June 21, 2015 with an inaugural ceremony. It was attended by various guests including the spiritual leader of the Muslim community in Pisa, Imam Mohamed Khalil. The rabbi of the Jewish community of Pisa referred to him as "one of our confreres".
