= Disability in the Middle Ages =

Disability is poorly documented in the Middle Ages, though people with disabilities constituted a large part of medieval society as part of the peasantry, clergy, and nobility. Very little was written or recorded about a general disabled community at the time, but their existence has been preserved through religious texts and some medical journals.

== Disability in culture ==
People with disabilities were not seen as a distinct social category, and were regarded as an integral part of medieval society. Some of the impairments that are now considered disabilities were acknowledged in the Middle Ages, with terms such as "blynde", "dumbe", "deaff" and "lame". More vague terms also existed, such as "infirmi" or impotens".

Disability was not necessarily perceived as an obstacle to community life, although inclusion within society did vary according to factors such as geographical location.

Due to the intensive labor that constituted agriculture during this time period, many peasants and serfs have been found with extensive spinal and limb injuries, as well as stunted growth, malnutrition and general deformity.

People with disabilities were found among all parts of society, including in powerful positions. Monarchs across Europe were noted as having those with short stature, hunchbacks, or others with disabilities in their courts where they filled roles such as that of the King's Fool or court jester. This rank gave the disabled person a level of prestige. They were allowed to mock or tell the truth to the ruler, even if it displeased them to hear it.

== Disability in religion ==
Christianity, the dominant religion in western Europe, held mixed views on disability. Within the Bible, disability was aligned with sin and punishment, but also with healing and martyrdom.

Some medieval priests and scholars believed that a body would be corrupted by sin and therefore divine punishment took the form of physical illnesses. However, opposing schools of thought revolved around the concept that those with disabilities showed a higher form of piety than those who did not have physical impairments.

=== The Bible ===
In the Old Testament, God gave people disabilities as a form of divine punishment, with the root of it being a payment for the sins they have committed.

In the New Testament, there is much more content concerning healing and the miracles performed by Jesus Christ.

=== Canon Law ===
Canon Law, the legal codes that the Catholic Church followed, contained few restrictions against those with disabilities, such as the barring of physically disabled from becoming holy men. However, there were contradictory laws within the codes, allowing for those who were disabled after reaching priesthood to be able to move up the hierarchy and become bishops.

The Fourth Lateran Council of 1215 enacted a law that linked bodily infirmity to sometimes be caused by sin. Therefore, medieval physicians were asked to hear their patients confessions so that their soul would be "cured" before the body was assessed.

=== Charity ===
People with disabilities were often seen as vectors of salvation for wealthy Christians who would donate alms, the recipients praying on behalf of the donor. Foundations and institutions were created, such as leper houses and hospices.

France's Louis IX (Saint Louis) granted blind people a rare legal right to beg on the streets of Paris.

== Disability in medieval medicine ==
Within the medical world of the Middle Ages, illness and disability were causally linked to sin. Since religion played a large role within medieval society, many of the changes and deformities to the human body were attributed to one's sins, dating back to Original Sin. There were mixed reactions and perspectives of people with disabilities, because different groups of Christians viewed disabilities in different ways.

Generally, medieval physicians attributed much of their work to a combination of the ability to treat illness, such as fever and blisters, and religious faith. If an illness or physical impairment did not subside over time, it was considered an "incurable illness" and therefore was deemed as an act of God.

== Predominant disabilities ==
The terminology surrounding disability, in the Middle Ages, was fluid, conflating different conditions. Some impairments, however, were already recognised as such by medieval people.

=== Physical impairments ===
While wheelchairs did not exist yet in the Middle Ages, various assistive devices and prostheses already existed, such as walking crutches or sticks, walking frames, wheelbarrows, or peg legs.

=== Sensory impairments ===
==== Visual impairment ====
Visual impairments held an ambiguous role in medieval society: blinding was used as a punishment, and plays and games were made to mock visual impairments, but, at the same time, hospices were created for people with visual impairments, such as the Hospice des Quinze-Vingts, which later became the Quinze-Vingts National Ophthalmology Hospital.

==== Hearing impairments ====
As for other categories of impairments, people with hearing impairments were treated differently depending on geography and their social class. In a Christian society, those with hearing impairments had an ambiguous status, as the impairment was seen as both a proof of resistance to faith, and imperviousness to temptation.

While hearing loss was often considered as untreatable, different remedies were still imagined for it, such as cupping the ear to withdraw earwax, hearing exercises, or ear drops.

Though their participation in legal matters was limited, they were allowed to participate in religious life, and could confess with signs.

While monastic communities sometimes used some forms of sign language, those were incomplete languages, and there was no genuine sign language for people with hearing impairment.

=== Mental impairments ===
People with mental disorders were considered their family's responsibility, and were not necessarily excluded from society. The origins of psychiatric conditions were unclear in the Middle Ages, although some treatments were already recommended.

Within the High Middle Ages, an almshouse in the City of London began caring for people with mental disabilities, and Bethlem hospital became the first mental institution in Europe.

==== Glass delusion ====
A few notable cases of glass delusion occurred during the Late Middle Ages. This mental disorder involved a person believing that they were made of glass and that they were fragile, able to break or shatter upon impact.

==== Melancholia ====
Melancholia was believed to be caused by an imbalance of the Four humours within the human body, where an excess of black bile caused depression-like symptoms of sadness and sluggish, lethargic behavior.

=== Leprosy ===
Lepers offered one of the most familiar images of disability in the medieval period. A disease that affected many throughout medieval Europe, leprosy was caused by a combination of poor hygiene and lack of resources such as proper treatments for the disease.

At the time, there were mixed feelings about this group. Some, such as Francis of Assisi, argued that lepers were those who transformed themselves into the images of Jesus Christ and were to be treated as living symbol for his martyrdom. Others condemned the lepers as sinful, as the disease was often associated with improper sexual conduct.

To stop the spread of the disease, officials put individuals displaying symptoms and sometimes family members into leper houses. They were often in secluded locations and fashioned after monasteries.

== Notable disabled people of medieval Europe ==
Though disability was present throughout the Middle Ages, very few cases were documented during the early and high medieval periods, as few physicians could properly diagnose many conditions.

- Aelred of Rievaulx (1110–1167), English writer, abbot, and saint, suffered from self-inflicted malnutrition (fasting), as well as severe arthritis.
- King Magnus Sigurdsson (c. 1115–1139) who was blinded, mutilated and castrated.
- King Baldwin IV of Jerusalem (1161–1185) also known as the Leper King for the disease that afflicted him.
- Francis of Assisi (c. 1181–1226), an Italian friar, founder of the Franciscan order, who died sick and blind.
- King Charles VI of France (1368–1422; ruled 1380–1422), known as Charles le Fou (Charles the Mad), known to have experienced the glass delusion during his rule.
- King Henry VI of England (1421–1471; ruled 1422–1461 and 1470–1471)
- Nicasius Voerda, born blind and attended Louvain University in 1459, qualifying in arts and theology, later enrolling in University of Cologne in 1489 and earning a doctorate of canon law.

== See also ==
- History of medicine
- Disability in ancient Rome
