= Jütte =

Jütte or Jutte is a surname. Notable people with the surname include:

- Daniel Jütte, German historian
- Jan Jutte (born 1953), Dutch illustrator of children's literature
