= Rafael Mirami =

16th-century Jewish author

- Born: 16th century Duchy of Ferrara
- Occupations: Author; Optical physicist
- Years active: fl. 1582
- Known for: Study of catoptrical sciences

Rafael Mirami (Italian: Raffaele Mirami; fl. 1582) was a 16th-century Jewish author and optical physicist from the city of Ferrara. He is described as having "pioneered" the field of catoptrics.

== Biography ==
Mirami was active in the 16th century in the city of Ferrara. He wrote poetry and studied the science of optics and mirrors. He described little of himself in his writing, but presented himself as Jewish and a physicist. His Treatise, A Concise Introduction to the First Part of the Specularia..., was published in 1582. Some have credited his work around mirrors to have been influential in the development of scientific skepticism using reflective thinking. He also cited the field of catoptrics development and discovery to the thinking of sages, requiring a superior state of mind and wisdom. This has been credited as a fallacy of appeal to ancient wisdom.

Mirami's work in catoptrics allowed him to make astronomical calculations based on reflections, and his research in its applications is credited with having helped Pope Gregory XIII recalculate measurements for the creation of the Gregorian calendar.

He was an admirer of Abramo Colorni, and often cited him in his works. He also cited in his treatise the works of Dante, Horace, and Petrarch.

== Works ==
- Mirami, Rafael (1582). Compendiosa introduttione alla prima parte della specularia, cioe della scienza de gli specchi. Opera noua, nella quale breuemente, e con facil modo si discorreintorno agli specchi e si rende la cagione, di tutti i loro miracolosieffetti composta da Rafael Mirami (in Italian). Heredi di Francesco Rossi & Paolo Tortorino.
- Mirami, Rafael (1582). Tauole della Prima Parte della Specularia, cioe della Scienza de gli Specchi (in Italian). Heredi di Francesco Rossi & Paolo Tortorino.
