= Giuseppe Jaré =

Former Chief Rabbi of Ferrara and historian

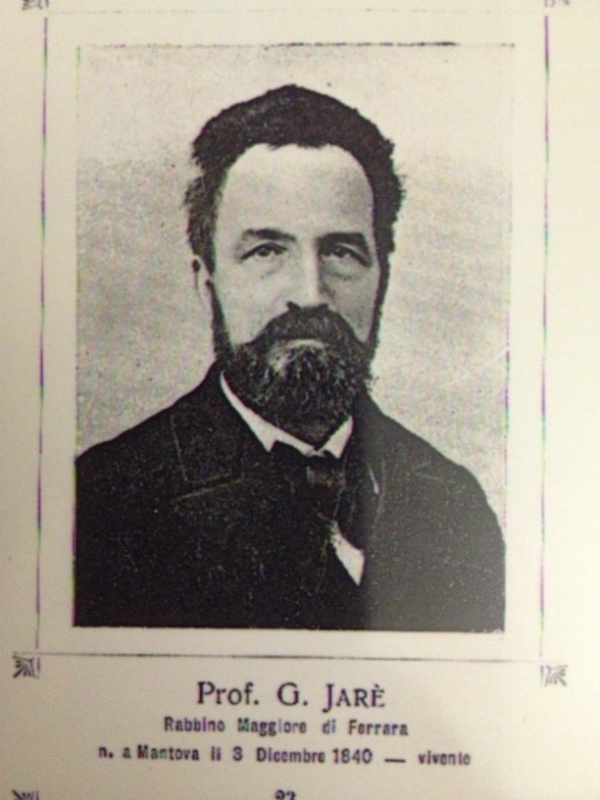
- Title: Rabbi

Personal life
- Born: December 3, 1840 Mantua, Italy
- Died: 1915 (aged 74–75) Ferrara, Italy
- Occupation: Professor

Religious life
- Religion: Judaism

Jewish leader
- Position: Chief Rabbi of Ferrara
- Yeshiva: Istituto Rabbinico of Padua
- Began: November 18, 1880
- Ended: 1915
- Semikhah: 1868

Rabbi Giuseppe Jaré (December 3, 1840 – 1915) was the Chief Rabbi of Ferrara, holding the office of the rabbinate as well as being a historian. He was one of the first biographers of rabbi Moshe Chaim Luzzato (RaMChaL).

== Biography ==
Jaré was born in Mantua on December 3, 1840. He studied and graduated from Istituto Rabbinico of Padua, being one of the last students of rabbi Samuel David Luzzatto (ShaDaL), being one of the students he mentioned by name in his commentary on the Torah. In 1868 he received his ordination, and at the same time a professor's diploma from the university.

Jaré was a rabbi in his home town of Mantua from 1868 to 1880, after which he moved to Ferrara. On November 3, 1880, he was elected chief rabbi of Ferrara and would move into the city on November 18, 1880. He would continue a close correspondence with the ShaDaL from there. In this role, he tried to improve the accessibility of sefarim to the Italian Jewish community. He did this while writing his own works and assisting other scholars in providing them with material. This would include a regular correspondence with the Società geografica italiana. He would also edit and assist in publishing the prison memoirs of the revolutionary Zaccaria Carpi and use his prominent position to gain access to state records to help write biographies on Abraham Colorni.

While still serving as the chief rabbi, Jaré died in 1915.

In accordance with his support for poetic Hebrew epitaph inscriptions, Jaré's tombstone was inscribed with poetry which gained the attention of scholars.

== Written Works ==
Jaré was a specialist in Jewish literature, he collaborated on the works of several prominent scholars. He also related his support for Hebrew epitaph inscriptions and recorded several inscriptions. His independent works included:

- In his work "Debate on the Eternity of the Torah" (Livorno, 1867)
- "Della Immutabilità della Legge Mosaica" (Leghorn, 1876)
- "Cenni su Abramo Colòrni" (Ferrara, 1891)

Along with these, Jare would write on a variety of subjects ranging from being one of the first to biograph rabbi Moshe Chaim Luzzato (RaMChaL), several religious texts and commentaries, and historical works discussing the history of the Italian Jewish community.
