= La ilustre fregona (film) =

1928 film

- Directed by: Armando Pou
- Screenplay by: Fernando Pou
- Produced by: Rafael Zomeño; Ángel Zomeño
- Cinematography: Armando Pou; Tomás Terol
- Production company: Venus Film Española
- Release date: 26 March 1928
- Country: Spain
- Language: Spanish

La ilustre fregona is a 1928 Spanish film directed by Armando Pou, starring Mari Muniain, Ángel de Zomeño, Modesto Rivas and Juan Romero. It is based on the story La ilustre fregona by Miguel de Cervantes.

The film was produced for Venus Film Española. It premiered at the Palacio de la Música in Madrid on 26 March 1928.
