= La cueva de Salamanca =

"La cueva de Salamanca" ("The Cave of Salamanca") is an entremés written by Miguel de Cervantes. It was originally published in 1615 in a collection called Ocho comedias y ocho entremeses nuevos, nunca representados.

== Plot summary ==
The head of the household, Pancracio, is about to leave for a four-day trip and his wife Leonarda appears to be deeply saddened by his departure. In reality, Leonarda is not the least saddened by her husband’s absence. In fact, she eagerly awaits the times he is away so that she may entertain guests. However, this time, soon after her husband leaves, a stranger appears at the door asking for a place to stay. Leonarda and her servant decide to put up the weary traveler, who identifies himself as a student from Salamanca who has fallen on hard times. When her two guests, Reponces and Nicolás, arrive, they make fun of the student's clothing and apparent lack of money. But, the women defend the presence of the student and they all proceed to have a good time. Then, when Pancracio unexpectedly returns home that evening due to transportation issues, the student's wit and stories save Leonarda, permitting her deception to remain unnoticed (at least for another night).

== Characters ==
1. Pancracio: The husband of Leonarda who is unaware of his wife's deception. The ease with which he accepts new ideas as truth is not stupidity but rather a result of his curiosity to know new things (Ezquerro 49). The entire work can be said to express the power of illusion, driven by a desire to know what is considered forbidden knowledge (Ezquerro 46).
2. Leonarda: The wife of Pancracio. She puts on the appearance of being a devout wife who is sad whenever her husband has to leave the house. However, she likes to take advantage of the times her husband is away to throw parties and invite other men over to the house.
3. Cristina: Leonarda's servant and partner in crime.
4. Carraolano: A student from Salamanca who is the unexpected visitor that arrives at Pancracio and Leonarda’s house soon after Pancracio departs. The student is a fast thinker and is very witty. It can be said that the power of the student lies with his language- he knows Latin, incantations, and has a solid mastery of using double language (Ezquerro 48). It is notable that he went from being an absolute stranger to having food in his belly, a place to stay, and being on good terms with all that came to be in the dinner party by the end of the story. The student's condition when we first meet him was due to his uncle's death while they were traveling in France on a trip to Rome. Now, all he wants to do his return to his land. It is possible that Cervantes uses this character to insert certain autobiographical elements. Also, it is notable that this is the character that inspired the title of the entremés, as the cave of Salamanca is the alleged location from which he received his unworldly knowledge.
5. Reponce: He is also referred to in the play by his employment title of sacristán, or sexton. Though a church official, he is also Leonarda's lover. His character is often interpreted as a symbol of anti-clericalism (Ezquerro 47).
6. Nicolás: Another man who Leonarda invites to the house when her husband is away. He is a barber and Cristina's lover.
7. Leoniso: Pancracio's travel companion and friend

== Principal themes ==
1. Deception
2. Connection between adultery and witchcraft
3. Metatheatre

== Salamanca and the works of Cervantes ==
In the work, the student refers to himself using the adjective, salamantino. This adjective is a direct reference to his origins in Salamanca. Leonarda however uses the adjective, salamanqueso. This is a play on words. A salamanqueso is a salamander which, according to legend, lives in fire. According to alchemists, the salamander is in fact the spirit of fire. To many in Latin America, this animal is associated with witchcraft (Ezquerro 50).

La cueva de Salamanca is not Cervantes' only work that touches on Spanish superstition surrounding Salamanca. In his short story called El licenciado vidriera, about a lawyer who was given a potion by a woman with the hopes that he would fall in love with her but subsequently is convinced that he is made of glass, the main character is an orphan with unknown origins who studies in Salamanca and later returns to the city to meet the woman who would alter his future.

== Intertextuality ==
Intertextuality, or the relationships between texts, that exists in La cueva de Salamanca includes relationships with other works of Cervantes including El licenciado vidriera and El viejo celoso. As discussed previously, El licenciado vidriera references the location of la cueva de Salamanca. Then, El viejo celoso shares a common theme with La cueva de Salamanca of deception. In both works, the wife is unhappy with her marriage and commits adultery right under the nose of her husband. In addition, La cueva de Salamanca also shares similarities to an entremés written by Pedro Calderón de la Barca called El dragoncillo. The two entreméses share key plot points: an adulterous wife caught by her husband while she is entertaining male house guests. However, El dragoncillo has a very different, and less happy, ending than La cueva de Salamanca (Contadini).

== Autobiographical elements ==
Based on information found in Jean Canavaggio, it is likely that Cervantes may have had to use his wit and people skills to get what he wanted or needed in life. Though from humble origins, Cervantes was employed by the Vatican for a short period of time before he joined the army. While serving his roles as the chamberlain of Consignor Acquaviva (who was about to become a Cardinal), he was responsible for domestic tasks much like a servant. Cervantes's interactions with Acquaviva's inner circle would have given him opportunities to refine his social skills and interact with the upper class.

== Function of the entremés ==
The entremés served to fill the time between acts of a much larger play and usually focused on light hearted things that would make the audience laugh. Cervantes was not one to listen to conventions when it did not serve his artistic purposes, as seen by the murder filled ending of El retablo de maravillas. Although La cueva de Salamanca is full of jokes, it also has some serious themes, including references to the devil. Essentially, the student's character is a reflection of the conventions of the entremés. The student's humorous comments make light of serious issues. As the essential character of the work, the student is responsible for moving the play along.

== Bibliography ==
1. Arrizabalaga, Mónica. “La cueva de Salamanca que parodió Cervantes: En uno de sus entremeses se inspiró en las legendarias clases del diablo en la cripta de San Cebrián.” ABC Cultura. Diario ABC, S.L, 19 March 2015. Web. 25 February 2016. http://www.abc.es/cultura/20150319/abci-cueva-salamanca-parodio-cervantes-201503171412.html
2. Canavaggio, Jean. “Encounter with History (1569-1580).” Cervantes. Trans. J.R. Jones. New York: W.W. Norton & Company, 1990. 48-96. Print.
3. Contadini, Luigi. “La cueva de Salamanca de Cervantes y El dragoncillo de Calderón: algunos aspectos del teatro barroco español.” Confluenze 2.1 (2010): 130-49. Web. 26 February 2016.
4. Clamurro, William H.. Studies on Cervantes and His Time, Volume 7 : Beneath the Fiction : The Contrary Worlds of Cervantes's "Novelas Ejemplares". New York, NY, USA: Peter Lang AG, 1998. ProQuest ebrary. Web. 29 April 2016.
5. Ezquerro, Milagros. “Análisis Semiológico de La cueva de Salamanca.” Centro Virtual Cervantes, 1988. Web. 25 February 2016. http://home.uchicago.edu/~jorgea/untitled%20folder/Analisis%20cueva.pdf
6. Fine, Ruth. "Las Ascuas Del Imperio. Crítica De Las Novelas Ejemplares De Cervantes Desde El Materialismo Filosófico." Cervantes 28.2 (2008): 212-217. Humanities International Complete. Web. 29 Apr. 2016.
7. Gutiérrez, Carlos, M. "Cervantes o La Relocalización Del Sujeto Teatral." Bulletin of the Comediantes 56.2 (2004): 289-310. ProQuest. Web. 29 Apr. 2016.
8. Hessel, Stephen. "The Dog's Growl: Narration In Las Novelas Ejemplares." Cervantes 28.2 (2008): 7-17. Humanities International Complete. Web. 29 Apr. 2016.
9. Lathrop, Tom. The Cervantes Encyclopedia. Cervantes 27.2 (2007): 239-241. Humanities International Complete. Web. 29 Apr. 2016.
10. Maestro, Jesús G. Sobre el diálogo y la “commedia dell’arte en los entremeses de Cervantes. La cueva de Salamanca. Fundación Biblioteca Virtual Miguel de Cervantes, 2003. Web. 25 February 2016. http://www.cervantesvirtual.com/obra/sobre-el-dilogo-y-la-commedia-dellarte-en-los-entremeses-de-cervantes-la-cueva-de-salamanca-0/
11. Reed, Cory A. Cervantes and the Novelization of Drama: Tradition and Innovation in the Entremeses. The Cervantes Society of America, 1991. Web. 25 February 2016. <%20https://www.h-net.org/~cervantes/csa/artics91/reed.htm> < https://www.h-net.org/~cervantes/csa/artics91/reed.htm>
12. Vaiopoulos, Katerina. De La Novela a La Comedia: Las Novelas Ejemplares De Cervantes En El Teatro Del Siglo De Oro. Vigo, Pontevedra (España: Editorial Academia del Hispanismo, 2010. Print.
