= Novelas ejemplares =

1613 short story collection by Miguel de Cervantes

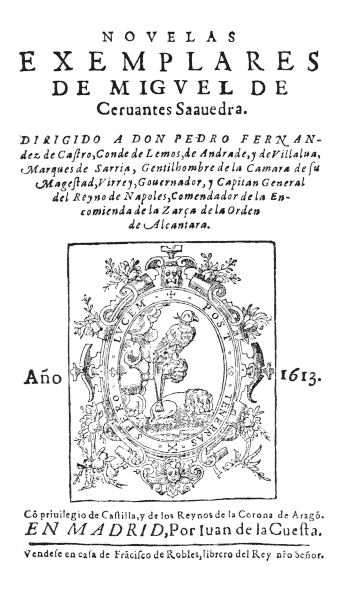
- 1613 edition, with the now archaic spelling "exemplares".
- Author: Miguel de Cervantes
- Original title: 'Novelas exemplares'
- Language: Spanish
- Publisher: Juan de la Cuesta
- Publication place: Spain

Novelas ejemplares ("Exemplary Novels") is a series of seven novellas, four novelettes, and one short story that follow the model established in Italy. The series was written by Miguel de Cervantes between 1590 and 1612 and printed in Madrid in 1613 by Juan de la Cuesta. Novelas ejemplares followed the publication of the first part of Don Quixote. The novellas were well received.

Cervantes boasted in his foreword to have been the first to write novelas in the Spanish language:

My genius and my inclination prompt me to this kind of writing; the more so as I consider (and with truth) that I am the first who has written novels in the Spanish language, though many have hitherto appeared among us, all of them translated from foreign authors. But these are my own, neither imitated nor stolen from anyone; my genius has engendered them, my pen has brought them forth, and they are growing up in the arms of the press.

The novellas are usually grouped into two series: those characterized by an idealized nature and those of a realistic nature. Those idealized in nature, which are the closest to the Italian models, are characterized by plots dealing with amorous entanglements, by improbable plots, by the presence of idealized characters and psychological development, and the low reflection of reality. They include: El amante liberal, Las dos doncellas, La española inglesa, La señora Cornelia and La fuerza de la sangre. These were the most popular of the novellas at the time. The realistic in nature cater to the descriptions of realistic characters and environments, with intentional criticism in many cases. The realistic in nature are the best-known stories today: Rinconete y Cortadillo, El licenciado Vidriera, La gitanilla, the short story El casamiento engañoso (leads directly into the fantasy novella El coloquio de los perros), and La ilustre fregona. However, the separation between the two groups is not sharp and elements of the idealistic may be found in some of the realistic novels.

Since there are multiple versions of two of these stories, it is believed that Cervantes introduced some variations in these novels for moral, social and aesthetic purposes (hence the name 'exemplary'). The more primitive versions were found in the manuscript, now lost, called by the name of its one-time possessor, Porras de la Cámara, a miscellaneous collection of various literary works which include a novel usually attributed to Cervantes, La tía fingida. On the other hand, some short stories are also embedded in Don Quixote, such as El curioso impertinente or Historia del cautivo, and where a character possesses a manuscript of Rinconete y Cortadillo, unpublished at the time (1605).

== Influence and adaptations ==
Cervantes' novellas inspired several English Jacobean dramas, whose authors might have read them either in French translation or in the Spanish original. Plays based on the novellas include Beaumont and Fletcher's Love's Pilgrimage (adapted from "Las dos doncellas"), Fletcher's The Chances ("La Señora Cornelia"), Fletcher's Rule a Wife and Have a Wife ("El casamiento engañoso"), and Middleton's The Spanish Gypsy ("La fuerza de la sangre" and "La gitanilla"), among others.

== The short stories ==
- La gitanilla

Story of a young man who falls in love with a gypsy. She asks him to be with her as a gypsy for two years. Later it is discovered that she is the lost daughter of the governor. He gets thrown into jail but is later released when it's revealed that he is of knightly descent. The two marry and live happily.

- El amante liberal

The story of Ricardo and Leonisa. When their ship sinks, Ricardo believes that Leonisa is dead. He discovers she is alive later, when she is being sold off as a slave. The Cadi wants her for himself, surprised by her beauty and charm, thinking of getting rid of his wife so he can keep her, but Ricardo recovers her to love her properly.

- Rinconete y Cortadillo

The story of two young thieves who make their way to Seville, where they are introduced to a local group of thieves that functions almost like a guild.

- La española inglesa

A seven-year-old girl named Isabela is kidnapped by an Englishman. She serves him as a servant, and his son falls in love with her because of her beauty. Since their love is mutual, they go to the Queen so she can approve of their union. She is impressed by Isabela's beauty and makes the boy prove himself worthy of her. He fights off Turkish ships and releases Spanish prisoners. He meets Isabela's parents but keeps quiet about knowing her. Her parents meet up with her.

Ricaredo's and Isabela's wedding is interrupted by the servant's son, who fell in love with her. The Queen sends Isabela back to Spain, calling the wedding off. The servant, blinded by anger, poisons Isabela. She receives treatment in time, but the poison's side effects diminish her beauty and she becomes ugly. She returns to Spain, ready to enter a convent, since Ricaredo never comes. Ricaredo is about to marry another woman, but during a Turkish war he is wounded, and everyone believes he is dead. He returns to Spain, meets up with Isabela, and marries her.

- El licenciado Vidriera

Tomás Rodaja, a young boy, is found by strangers, apparently abandoned. He impresses them with his wit and intelligence and they take him on as a sort of adoptive son. Tomás is sent to school, where he becomes famous for his learning; he grows up, travels all over Europe, and eventually settles in Salamanca, where he completes a degree in law.

In love with Tomás, a young woman procures an intended love potion, with which she laces a quince that Tomás eats. The potion does not work, instead putting Tomás in a grave state for months (the woman flees and is never heard from again).

When he re-emerges from convalescence Tomás is physically restored but delusional—chiefly, Tomás is convinced that his body is composed entirely of glass. His unshakable belief, combined with his clever, memorable aphorisms in conversation with everyone he meets, make Tomás famous throughout Spain, where he becomes known as 'Vidriera'—from the Spanish vidrio, which means 'glass'. Eventually, Tomás is invited to court, transported in a carriage packed with hay.

With time, Tomás recovers his sanity, only to discover to his horror throngs of people who never leave him alone, wanting to see the famous 'Vidriera'. Repulsed by fame and unable to continue as a lawyer, Tomás joins the army as an infantryman, eventually dying in an obscure battle.

- La fuerza de la sangre
- El celoso extremeño

Filipo de Carrizales, a former soldier, who after much financial success abroad in "las Indias" (the term the author uses for America—particularly Peru), settles in Sevilla, succumbing to the desire every man has to return to his homeland; as Cervantes writes, "tocado del natural deseo que todos tienen de volver a su patria". He falls in love with a young and beautiful girl called Leonora. Despite being from a poor family, she comes from a noble one, and he decides to love and protect her, seeing her worthy character through her poverty. He takes every precaution to protect her from the outside world and from other men, allowing no-one to pass through the second inner door apart from the female servants and the black eunuch, the only male allowed into her presence. By doing this and by bringing her presents, he protected her from the industry and the cursed humanity that could perturb her serenity: "por ninguna vía la industria ni la malicia humana podía perturbar su sosiego".

This plan is foiled by a younger man, Loaysa, who manages to enter and seduce Leonora by means of a very intricate plan. In the closing moments, Carrizales finds his wife asleep in bed with Loaysa, and instead of blaming them, he blames himself. Ashamed at the way he treated Leonora, he quietly retreats and dies. Leonora decides not to marry Loaysa and instead joins a convent. Loaysa in turn flees to "las indias" (the new world).

- La ilustre fregona
- Las dos doncellas
- La señora Cornelia
- El casamiento engañoso ("The Deceitful Marriage")

A prologue to the subsequent story. A soldier tells a friend the story of how he was deceived into marriage, even though he himself was less than truthful to his bride. The story ends with him describing how he overheard the dialogue that is related in the next story.

- El coloquio de los perros
