= Glass delusion =

Psychiatric disorder

Glass delusion is an external manifestation of a psychiatric disorder recorded in Europe mainly in the late Middle Ages and early modern period (15th to 17th centuries). People feared that they were made of glass "and therefore likely to shatter into pieces".

== Delusion ==
In the 16th and 17th centuries in Europe, glass became a valuable commodity. It was regarded as a magical alchemical object. Associated with fragility and luxury, glass influenced the way noblemen of early Europe perceived their esteemed positions in society. This fixation on a novel material contributed to the manifestation of the delusion. Edward Shorter, a historian of psychiatry from the University of Toronto, attributes the rise of the delusion in 17th-century Europe to the novelty of glass, stating that "throughout history, the inventive unconscious mind has pegged its delusions on to new materials and technological advances of the age." There is also a social explanation: copycat delusions spread by social contagion. The cases clustered among literate men — scholars, nobles, physicians — the people reading the medical case literature, and literary and historic accounts.

Concentration of the glass delusion among wealthy and educated social classes allowed modern scholars to associate it with a wider and better described disorder of melancholy.

== Contemporary accounts ==
Tommaso Garzoni documented a man who tried to throw himself into a glazier’s furnace and emerge as an inghistara, a long-necked jug without a handle.

Robert Burton's The Anatomy of Melancholy (1621) touches on the subject in the commentary as one of many related manifestations of the same anxiety:

Fear of devils, death, that they shall be so sick, of some such or such disease, ready to tremble at every object, they shall die themselves forthwith, or that some of their dear friends or near allies are certainly dead; imminent danger, loss, disgrace still torment others; that they are all glass, and therefore will suffer no man to come near them; that they are all cork, as light as feathers; others as heavy as lead; some are afraid their heads will fall off their shoulders, that they have frogs in their bellies, Etc.

Miguel de Cervantes based one of his short novels, The Glass Graduate (Spanish: El licenciado Vidriera, 1613), on the delusion of the title subject, an aspiring young lawyer named Tomás Rodaja. The protagonist of the story falls into a grave depression after being bedridden for six months subsequent to being poisoned with a purportedly aphrodisiac potion. He claims that, being of glass, his perceptions are clearer than those of men of flesh and demonstrates by offering witty comments. After two years of illness, Rodaja is cured by a monk; no details of the cure are provided except that the monk is allegedly a miracle-maker.

The Dutch poet Constantijn Huygens (whose contemporary Caspar Barlaeus experienced the glass delusion) wrote in Costly Folly (1622) of its subject:

He fears everything that moves in his vicinity... the chair will be the death for him; he trembles at the bed, fearful that one will break his bum, the other smash his head.

French philosopher René Descartes wrote Meditations on First Philosophy (1641), using the glass delusion as an example of an insane person whose perceived knowledge of the world differs from the majority. In An Essay Concerning Human Understanding (Book II, Chapter XI, 13) when proposing his celebrated model of madness, John Locke also refers to the glass delusion.

In modern times, the glass delusion has not completely disappeared, and there are still isolated cases today. "Surveys of modern psychiatric institutions have only revealed two specific (uncorroborated) cases of the glass delusion. Foulché-Delbosc reports finding one Glass Man in a Paris asylum, and a woman who thought she was a potsherd was recorded at an asylum in Merenberg." Andy Lameijn, a psychiatrist from the Netherlands, reported in 2015 that he had a male patient suffering from the delusion in Leiden.

German alchemist Johann Joachim Becher had a fascination with glass delusion. In Physica Subterranea (1669), he claimed to have discovered a way of turning dead human bodies into glass.

== Notable cases ==
=== Charles VI of France ===
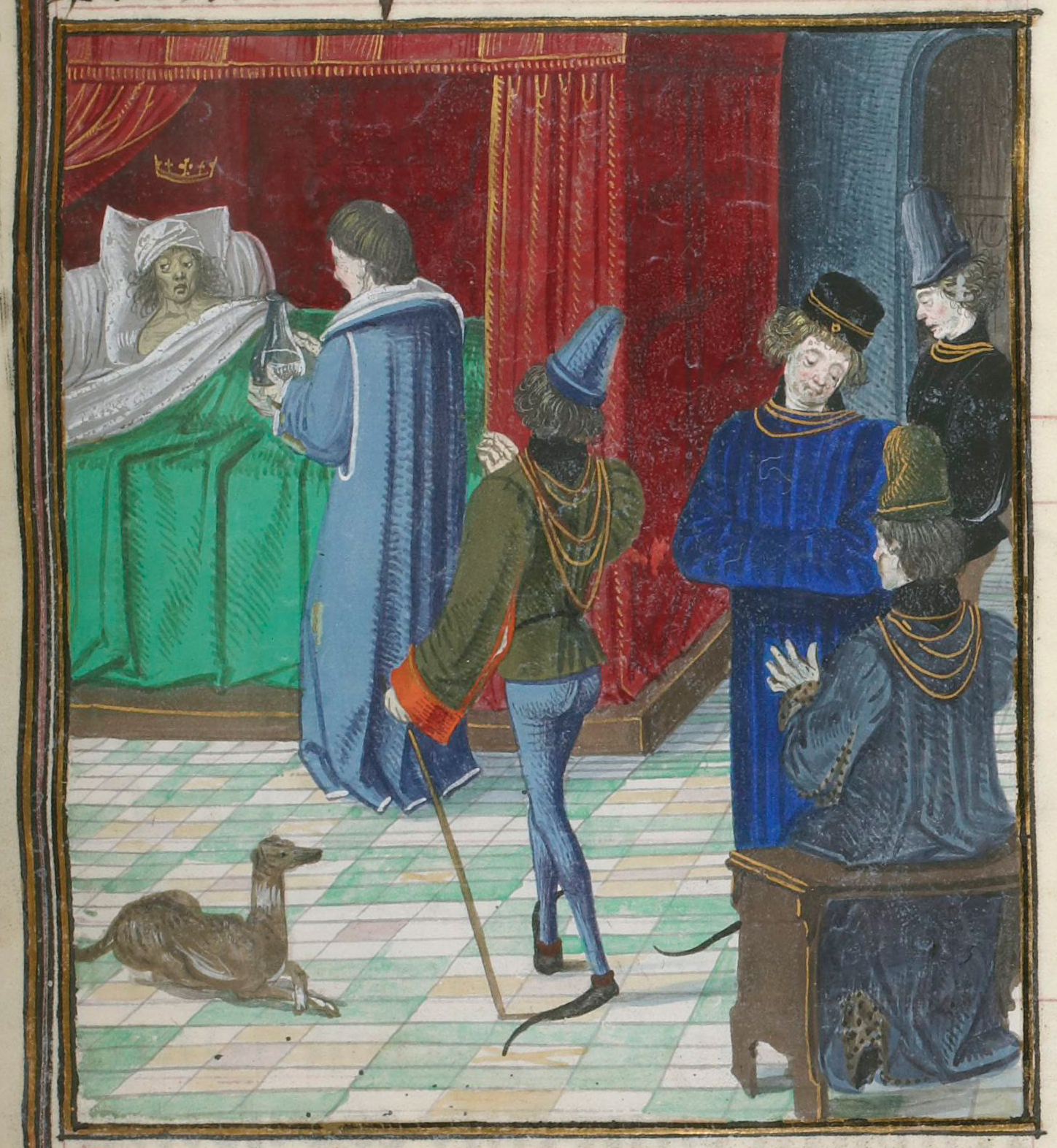
Charles VI ill in bed. Chroniques de Jean Froissart

King Charles VI of France was afflicted by the glass delusion in his twenties. He wore clothing that was reinforced with iron rods and did not allow his advisors to come near him due to his fear that his body would accidentally shatter. He may have been the first known case of glass delusion. Earlier, he had survived the traumatic event of the Bal des Ardents, when his costume, and those of his companions, caught fire. He had also furiously attacked his courtiers, out of fear of traitors, while riding to war; later, he forgot that he had done so.

=== Princess Alexandra of Bavaria ===
Princess Alexandra of Bavaria believed that she had swallowed a glass piano as a child. She was convinced that the object remained inside her body from that point on, fearful that it might shatter and puncture her organs.

=== Georgios Hatzianestis ===
Georgios Hatzianestis, a Greek military officer, was commander of the Army of Asia Minor during the Greco-Turkish War in 1922. He failed to adequately respond to the Great Offensive that turned the war in the Turks' favour because he believed that his legs were made of glass and could shatter if he moved. For his failure, he was tried as an anti-Venizelist in the Trial of the Six (the only military leader to be so prosecuted) and was executed for high treason.

== See also ==
- El licenciado Vidriera
