= Zachariah Carpi =

Zachariah Carpi (In Italian Zaccaria; in Hebrew יששכר חיים קארפי, Issachar Hayim Carpi) was an Italian-Jewish revolutionary, born at Revere in the second half of the 18th century. After the French Revolution he appears to have engaged in plots against the Austrian government of Lombardy. On 25 March 1799, he and his son, Mordecai Moses Carpi, were imprisoned at Mantua. When Napoleon reached that city in 1800, Carpi was sent to Venice, thence to Sebenico (now Šibenik, Croatia) in Dalmatia, and through Carinthia and Croatia to Peterwardein in Hungary, where he was at last released by Napoleon's orders on 3 April 1801. He wrote a narrative of his imprisonment under the title Toledot Yitzchaq, which was edited by G. Jaré, and published at Cracow in 1892. Besides this, he wrote an account of his early life, under the title Megillat Yitzchaq, and a book for children entitled Dibre Yitzchaq. The last two works are no longer extant.
