= La ilustre fregona =

- Author: Miguel de Cervantes
- Original title: La ilustre fregona
- Language: Spanish
- Genre: Novella
- Published in: Novelas ejemplares
- Media type: Print

La ilustre fregona (The Illustrious Kitchen Maid or The Illustrious Scullery-maid) is a novella by Miguel de Cervantes, published in the collection Novelas ejemplares. It tells the story of two wealthy young men who fall in love with a kitchen maid in Toledo. The story contains mistaken identities, ironic comments and genre traits of the picaresque novel and pastoral romance.

It was the basis for the 1928 Spanish film La ilustre fregona, directed by Armando Pou.
