= El licenciado Vidriera =

"The Lawyer of Glass"
- Short story by Miguel de Cervantes
- Original title: El licenciado Vidriera
- Country: Spain
- Language: Spanish

Publication

"El licenciado Vidriera" ("The Lawyer of Glass" or "The Glass Graduate") is a short story written by Miguel de Cervantes and included in his Novelas ejemplares, first published in 1613. In the story, a young scholar goes mad, believing himself to be made entirely of glass, and becomes famous for his satirical comments on the society around him. He eventually becomes cured and leaves his scholar's life to join the army, dying in battle.

The tale is commonly considered the most difficult story to interpret in its collection. Scholars have variously seen it as a comment on "scholars' melancholy", a collection of aphorisms, a warning on the dangers of social hypocrisies, a case study of strychnine poisoning, or a comment on the futility of satire itself. The term "licenciado vidriera" has entered the Spanish language as meaning one excessively timid or delicate.

== Plot summary ==
Tomás Rodaja, a young boy, is found by strangers, apparently abandoned. He impresses them with his wit and intelligence enough for them to raise him as a sort of adoptive son. Tomás is sent to school, where he becomes famous for his learning; he grows up, travels all over Europe, and eventually settles in Salamanca, where he completes a degree in law.

In love with Tomás, a young woman procures an intended love potion, with which she laces a quince that Tomás eats. The potion does not work, instead putting Tomás in a grave state for months (the woman flees and is never heard from again).

When he re-emerges from convalescence Tomás is physically restored but delusional – chiefly, Tomás is convinced that his whole body is composed entirely of glass. His unshakable belief, combined with Tomás' clever, memorable aphorisms in conversation with everyone he meets, make him famous throughout Spain, where he becomes known as "Vidriera" – from the Spanish vidrio, which means "glass". Eventually, Tomás is invited to court, transported in a carriage packed with hay.

With time, Tomás recovers his sanity, only to discover to his horror throngs of people who never leave him alone, wanting to see the famous "Vidriera". Repulsed by fame and unable to continue as a lawyer, Tomás joins the army as an infantryman, eventually dying in an obscure battle.

== Composition ==
Gwynne Edwards notes that the story is traditionally dated to between 1604 and 1606, and that the difficult events of Cervantes' life at this time have been seen as influencing the story's pessimistic tone. However, Edwards himself argues that the story was at minimum revised before its 1613 publication, and its composition date cannot be fixed with certainty.

Scholarly attempts to find a real-life model for the character of Tomás Rodaja have been made, but are generally seen as unconvincing.

== Interpretation ==
Many Cervantes scholars have noted that "El licenciado Vidriera" is the most difficult story to interpret of the Novelas ejemplares. According to Cervantes scholar Daniel Hemple,

Most modern critics have believed that they held all the pieces to a puzzle, been unsure of how they fitted. A few have despaired; others have claimed to have solved it, and yet others said it was poorly designed in the first place. Each explanation has proved unsatisfactory to other writers, and has given way to yet another.

Gwynne Edwards, writing in 1973, divided the critical views of the story up to that date into three camps: those who attempted (unsuccessfully) to find a real life model for the character of Tomás; those who saw Tomás as a convenient mouthpiece for Cervantes to satirize contemporary Spanish society; and those who read it as a more artistic whole, commenting on satirists as well as delivering satire itself.

One important irony of the story is that while Tomás is terrified of being broken physically and goes to great lengths to protect his body, it is in fact his spirit that is ultimately shattered by the hypocrisies and cruelties of society. Edwards argues that this echoes Cervantes' own disillusionment upon returning from the physical dangers of war to the dispiriting realities of civilian life. By changing to a military career at the story's end, Tomás follows the only path that still allows an honorable life.

In English translator Lesley Lipson's reading, Tomás becomes a sort of satirist, but is unable to contribute anything meaningful to society with his satire. Scholar Gill Speak, in contrast, situates the story within the context of other "Glass Men" in contemporary European literature, who were in turn a comment on "scholar's melancholy." In this reading, Tomás's madness is an inevitable outgrowth of his intellectual pursuits, and his cure requires him to again take up the active life of the soldier. Critic Walter Glannon also attributes Tomás's madness to his intellectual lifestyle, but sees its source in society's lack of acceptance of intellectual pursuits. In this interpretation, Tomás's neurotic attachment to intellectual achievement prevents him from experiencing normal social interaction.

Scholar Alan R. Messick notes that the story can be read as a well-observed clinical case study, echoing Cervantes' interest in medical topics and scientific explanations for mental illness. According to Messick, Tomás's symptoms and eventual recovery mirror those common in strychnine poisoning, presumably from an ingredient in the supposed love potion he consumes.
