= Biblioteca Teresiana =

Public library in Mantua, Italy

Coordinates: 42.32676°N 12.23628°E

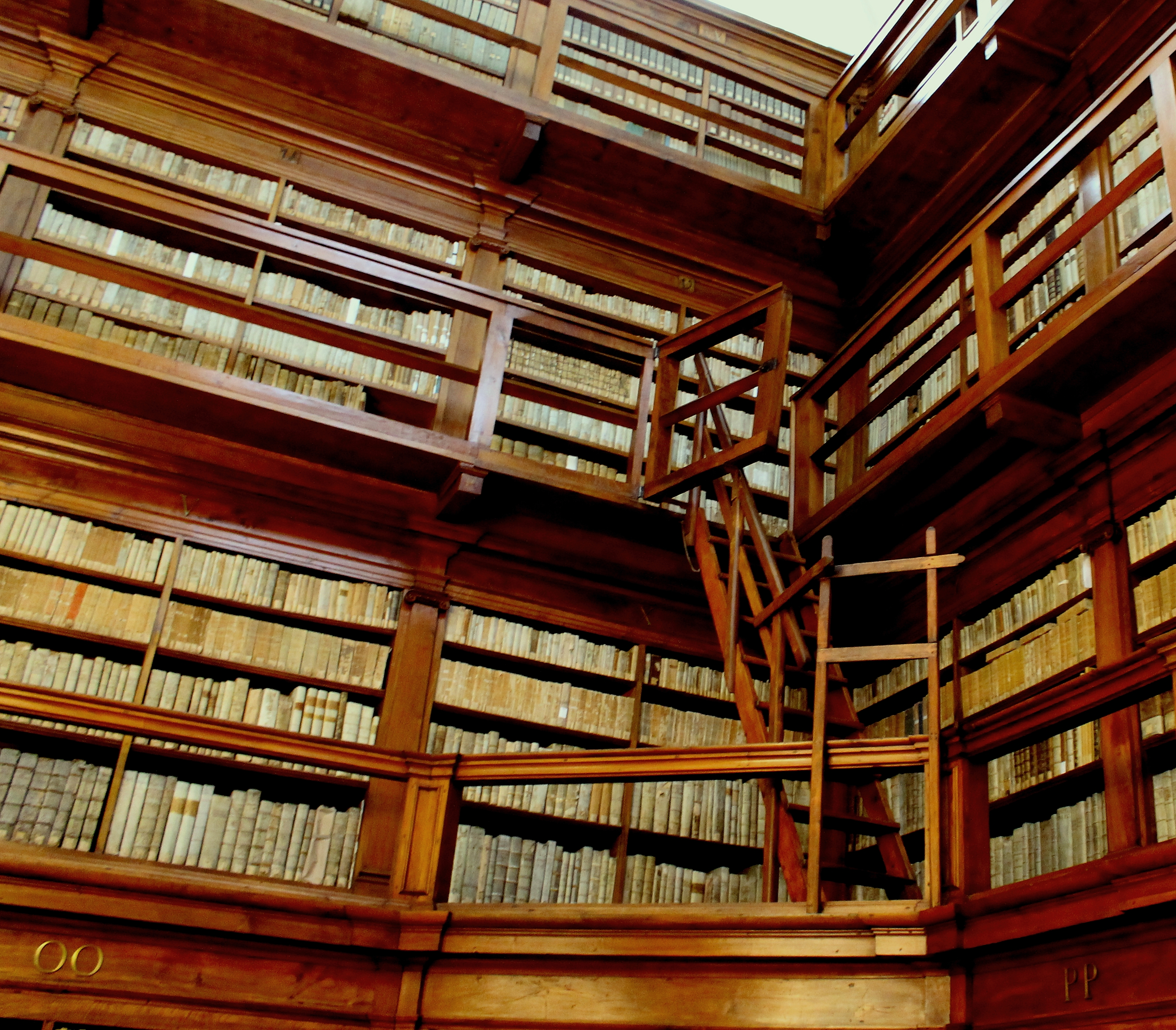
Biblioteca Teresiana in Mantua (photo 2014)

The Biblioteca Teresiana (est. 1780) of Mantua, Italy, is a public library founded by sovereign Maria Theresa.

== History ==
The Teresiana Library was founded by Maria Theresa as part of a larger series of education reforms throughout Mantua and Lombardo-Veneto. It opened to the public on March 30, 1780.

The library collection began with the building housing in Mantua the former Jesuit College, a complex which took up an entire block. After the suppression of this order in 1773, its private collection meant for the teachers and students was repurposed into a public library, the Imperial Regia Biblioteca. It was housed two library rooms, designed by architect Paolo Pozzo in 1780, which would be known as the Teresian rooms. When Mantua joined the Kingdom of Italy in 1866, The Teresiana Library became a government library. It became a municipal library in 1881. It contained valuable works from many private monastic libraries.

In the 1970s and 1980s, city officials became concerned by the growing number of patrons in combination with the building's structural issues and lack of and lack of space for storage and computer technology. The library began renovation in March 2008 and was reopened in 2011. Among the items requiring attention were the Teresiana's 18th-century walnut shelves, and the addition of new air conditioning, lighting, and wireless systems. All of the 44,000 books in the Teresian Rooms had to be removed while the shelves were restored, during which time the books were also under maintenance. Following the restoration, several scholars used the data from the restoration of the print collection in studies of the paper degradation.

It currently has a digital collection available with over 520,000 images. The collection includes some rare and unique manuscripts as well as paintings and globes by Vincenzo Coronelli and other artists.

== Bibliography ==
- Ennio Sandal (1990). "Endowed Municipal Public Libraries". Libraries & Culture. 25 (3: Libraries and Librarianship in Italy). USA: 358–371. JSTOR 25542275.
