= Maggino Gabrielli =

Venetian-Jewish inventor and entrepreneur

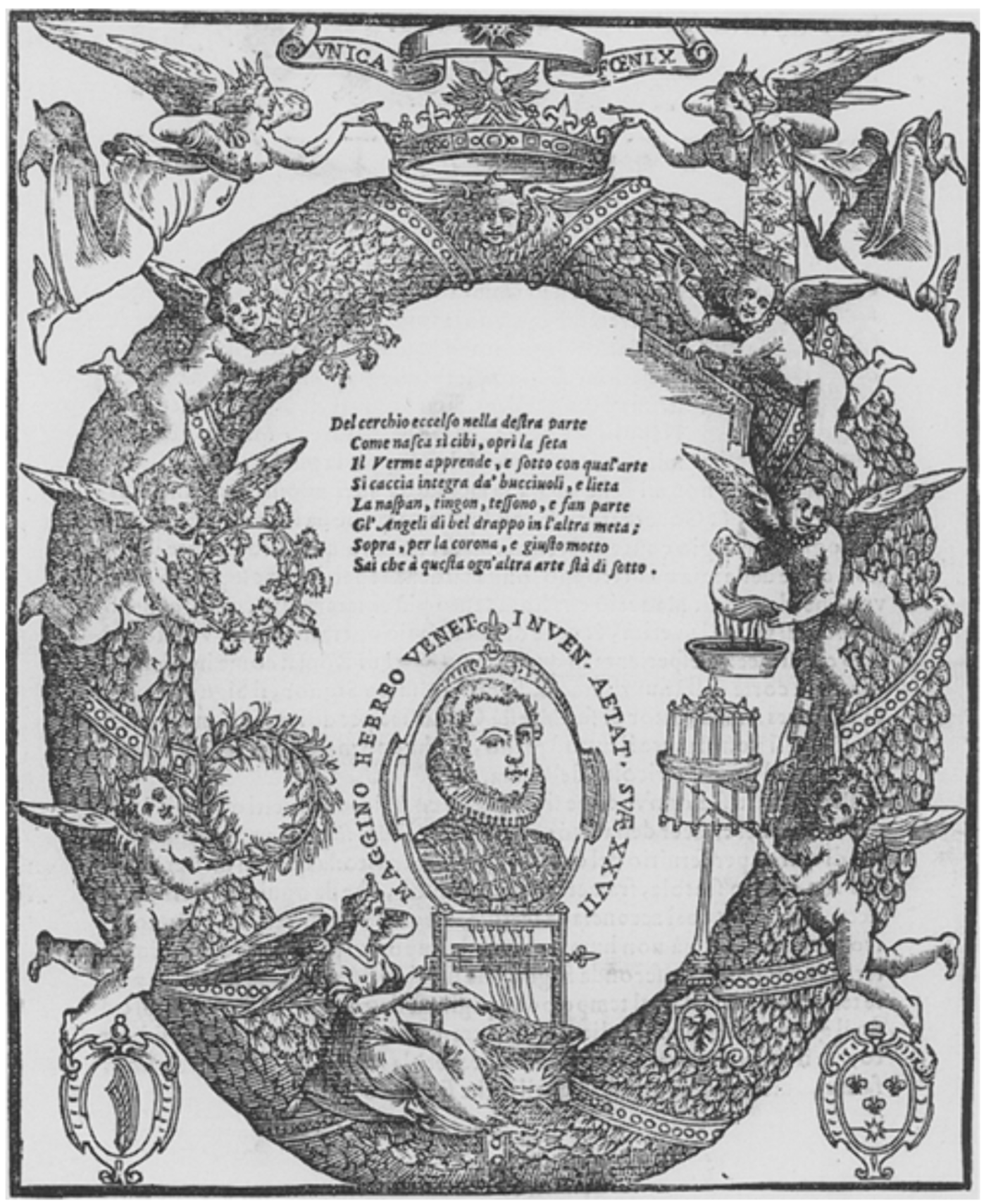
Anonymous, Magino di Gabrielli, frontispiece woodcut, from Magino di Gabrielli, Dialoghi, Rome, 1588. Biblioteca Apostolica Vaticana, Vatican City, Rome, Capponi II 74, p. ix.

Maggino Gabrielli, Meïr Di Gabriele Magino, or Mazo di Gabriel (fl. 1587 – c. 1593) was a Venetian-Jewish inventor, entrepreneur, alchemist, and silk manufacturer who lived during the 16th century.

Gabrielli started producing crystal glass and mirrors throughout the Papal States for church windows in Rome in 1588. He obtained a monopoly on silk production in 1587. After the death of Pope Sixtus V he went to the Medici court, but he faced protests and resigned, eventually moving to the duchy of Lorraine, where he established an Oriental Trade Company. His goal was to create a network of trade entrepôts throughout Germanic lands, but he returned to Italy and died shortly thereafter while accompanying the Tuscan grand duke on a military campaign against the Turks. His only publication is a treatise on sericulture, Dialoghi di M. Magino Gabrielli hebreo venetiano sopra l'utili sue inventioni circa la seta, published in Rome in 1588.

He worked with Abramo Colorni and Giovan Battista Guidoboni. He obtained several patents from Venice, Florence, the Pope and the King of Spain to capitalize on his silk-related inventions. His business consisted of a network of partnerships for the production of silk fabrics, woollen cloth, gold thread, and glass, with workshops in Livorno, Pisa and Florence. He also owned a paper mill and a farm for silkworm rearing in Tuscany. In 1593 he obtained a patent from the Florentine government for the production of linen oil.

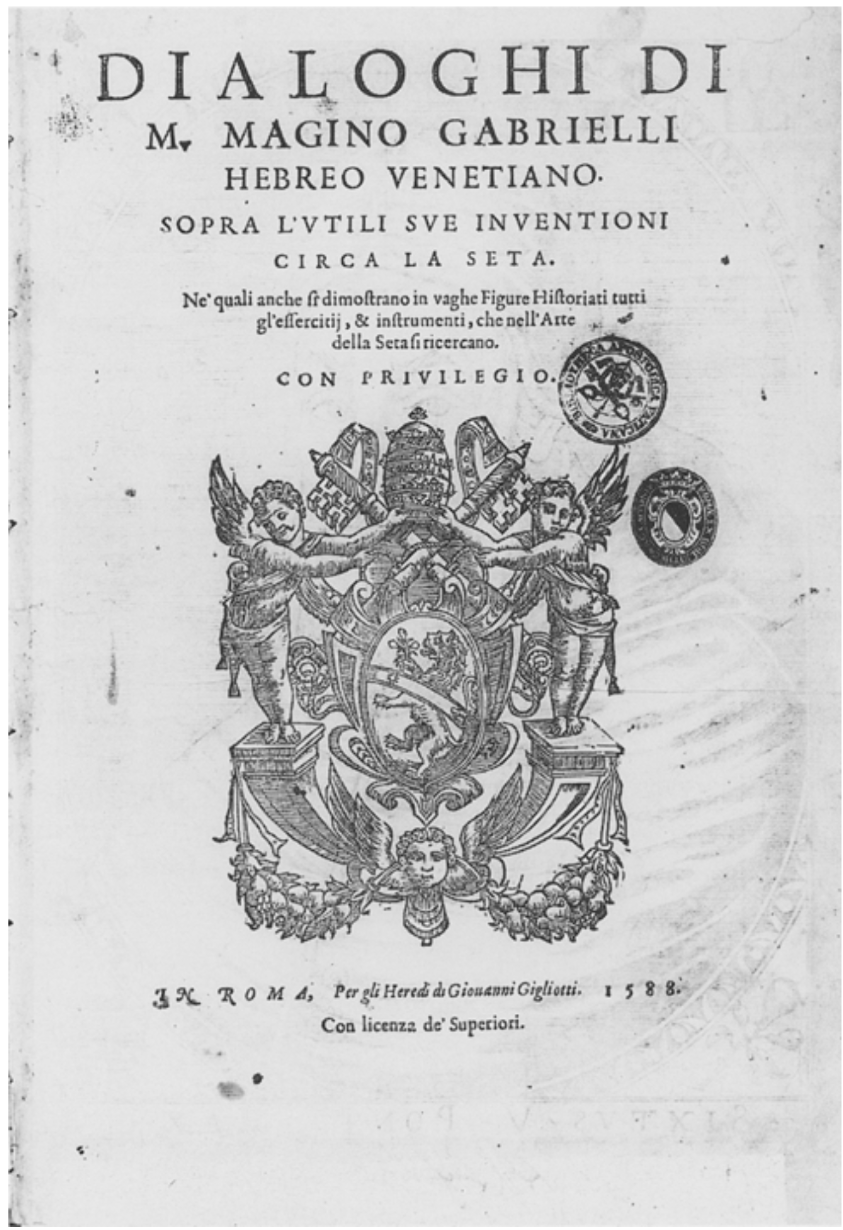

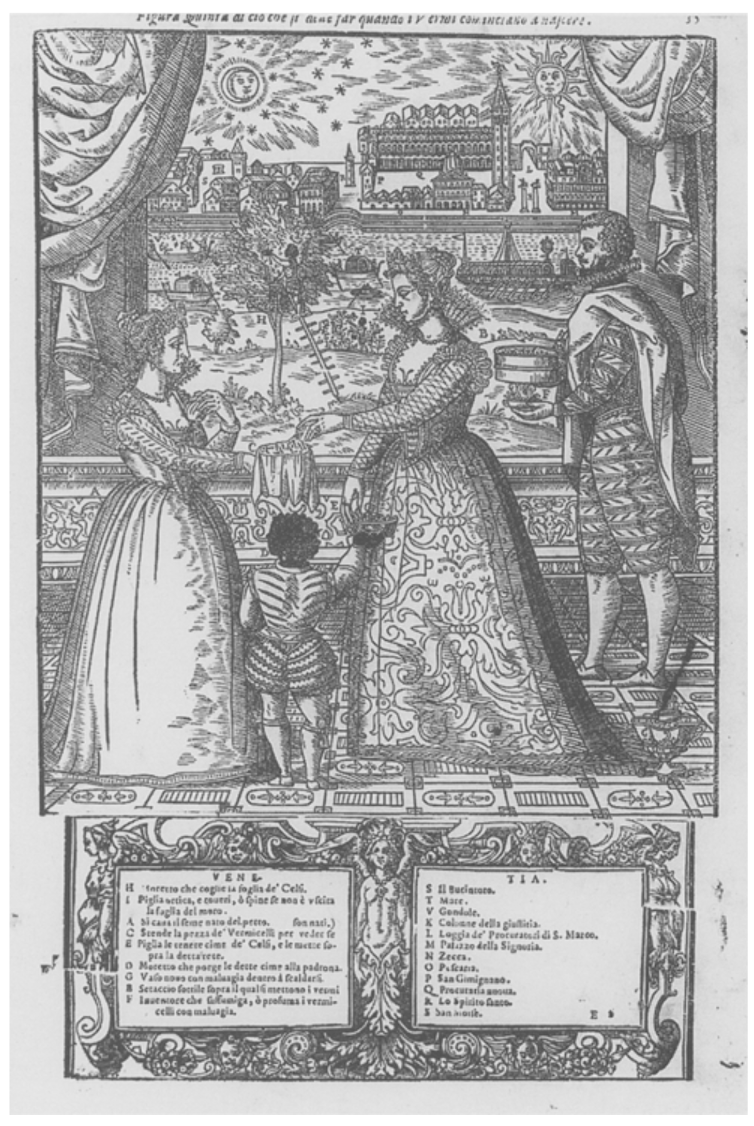

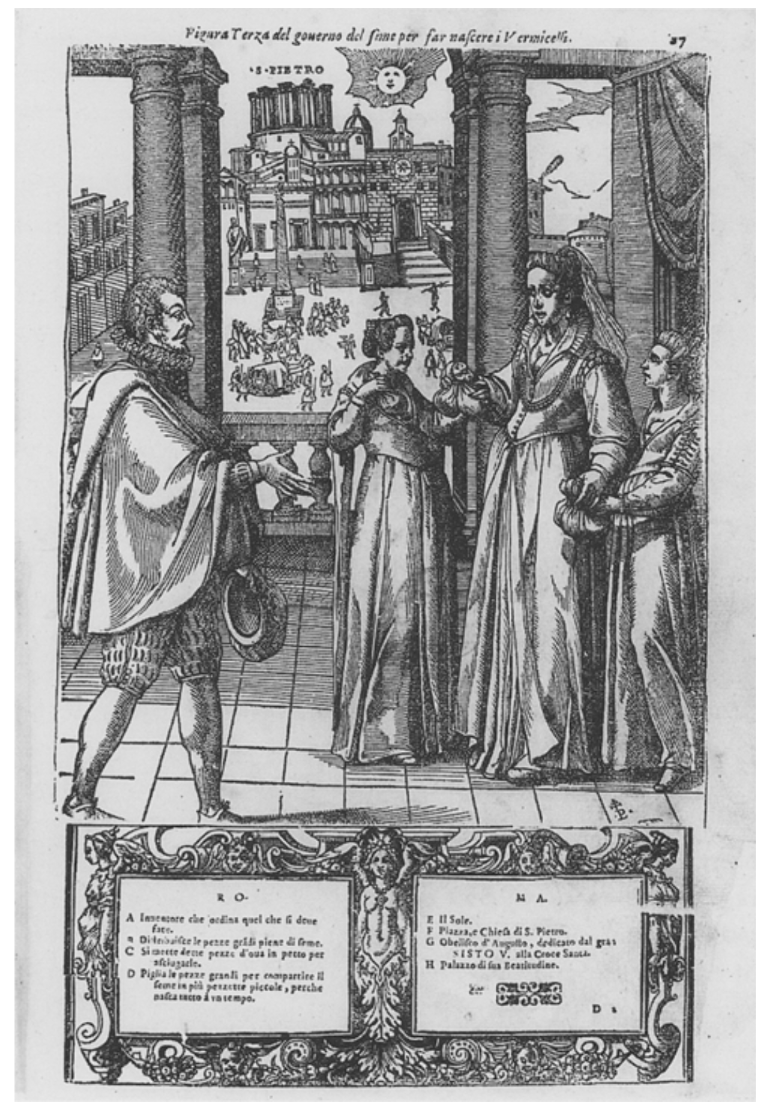

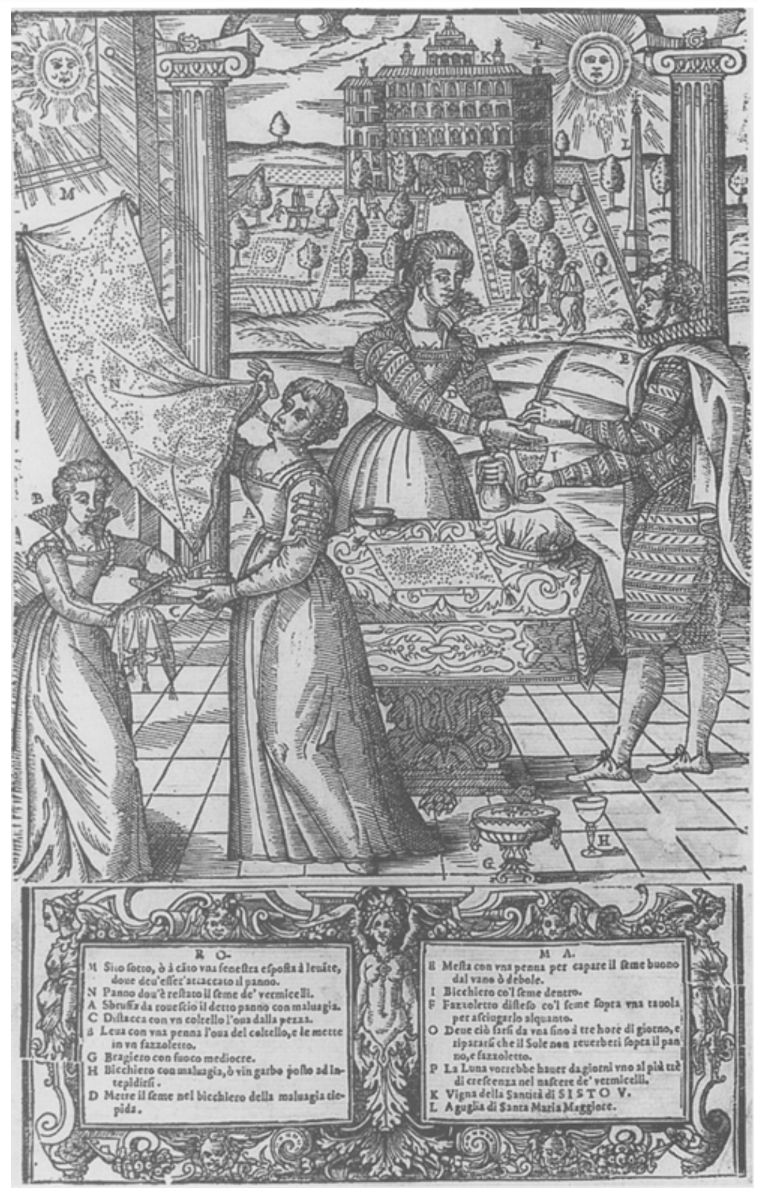
