= El celoso extremeño =

The short story "El Celoso extremeño" ("The Jealous Extremaduran") is one of twelve short stories published by Miguel de Cervantes in 1613 under the title Novelas Ejemplares.

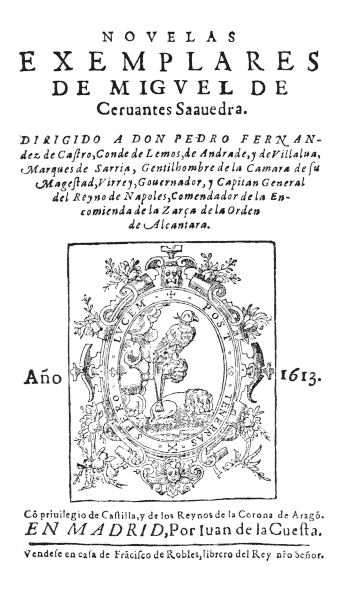
El celoso extremeño

== Plot ==
Filipo de Carrizales, a former soldier, who after much financial success abroad in "las Indias" (the term with which the author refers to America - particularly mentioning Peru), settles in Sevilla, succumbing to the desire every man has to return to his homeland; as Cervantes writes, "tocado del natural deseo que todos tienen de volver a su patria". He falls in love with a young and beautiful girl called Leonora. Despite being from a poor family, she comes from a noble one and he decides to love and protect her, seeing her worthy character through her poverty. He takes every precaution to protect her from the outside world and from other men, allowing no-one to pass through the second inner door, apart from the female servants or the black eunuch, this being the only male allowed into her presence. By doing this and by bringing her presents he was protecting her from the industry and the cursed humanity that could perturb her serenity, "por ninguna vía la industria ni la malicia humana podía perturbar su sosiego".

This plan is foiled by a younger man, Loaysa, who manages to enter and seduce Leonora by means of a very intricate plan. In the closing moments Carrizales finds his wife asleep in bed with Loaysa, and instead of blaming them he blames himself. Ashamed at the way he treated Leonora he quietly retreats and dies. Leonora decides not to marry Loaysa and instead joins a convent. Loaysa in turn flees to "las indias" (the new world).
