= Daniel Jütte =

Israeli historian

- דניאל יוטה
- Awards: Dan David Prize

Academic work
- Discipline: history
- Institutions: New York University

Daniel Jütte (Hebrew: דניאל יוטה) is a German historian (born in Israel) and Professor of History at New York University. He is a winner of the Dan David Prize. He works on the history of early modern and modern Europe, especially in the areas of cultural history and the history of urban and material culture.

== Books ==
- Jütte, Daniel (2023). Transparency: The Material History of an Idea. New Haven: Yale University Press. ISBN 978-0-300-23724-5.
- Jütte, Daniel (2015). The Strait Gate: Thresholds and Power in Western History. New Haven: Yale University Press. ISBN 978-0-300-21108-5.
- Jütte, Daniel (2015). The age of secrecy: Jews, Christians, and the economy of secrets, 1400-1800. New Haven: Yale university press. ISBN 978-0-300-19098-4.
