= Tommaso Garzoni =

Italian writer

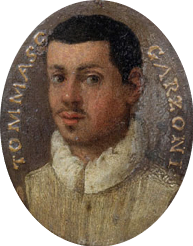
- Born: Ottaviano Garzoni; March 1549; Bagnacavallo, Romagna
- Died: 8 June 1589 (aged 40); Bagnacavallo, Romagna
- Writing career
- Period: Renaissance
- Genre: Speculum literature
- Notable work: The Hospital of Incurable Madness

Tommaso Garzoni (born Ottaviano, Bagnacavallo, March 1549 – 8 June 1589) was an Italian Renaissance writer.

== Life ==
Tommaso Garzoni was born in March 1549 in Bagnacavallo (a village in the Papal States near Ravenna) to a humble family, who however succeeded to pay for his education. He briefly studied law in Ferrara, then logic in Siena. At the age of seventeen, on 18 October 1566, he entered in the Canons Regular of the Lateran, the religious order who held the Santa Maria in Porto Basilica in Ravenna. On that occasion he took the religious name of Tommaso (or Tomaso).

Garzoni spent most of his life in the monastery of Santa Maria del Porto, though he had contacts with literary circles and was elected to the Accademia degli Informi in Ravenna just before his death. Returned to his birth town to preach on the Bible, he died on 8 June 1589, and he was buried in the local church of Saint Francesco.

With a prodigious inventive faculty, in the last six years of his short existence he wrote all the works - bizarrely encyclopedic - that would make him famous. His interests ranged from natural philosophy to manual trades. He is best known for La piazza universale di tutte le professioni del mondo (1585), which, with its descriptions of unusual professions, shows a fascination with taxonomy and encyclopedic listings evident also in other writings. Many of his writings were aimed at confuting the occult philosophy of Cornelius Agrippa von Nettesheim. He was also the first to write in Italian a complete biographical catalog of women in the Bible (Le vite delle donne illustri della Sacra Scrittura).

Garzoni's eclectic work had a vast European success (numerous translations and reprints), to the point of consecrating him among the most popular Italian authors of the late sixteenth century. Today, after a long oblivion, Garzoni is again discovered and analyzed by critics.

== Works ==
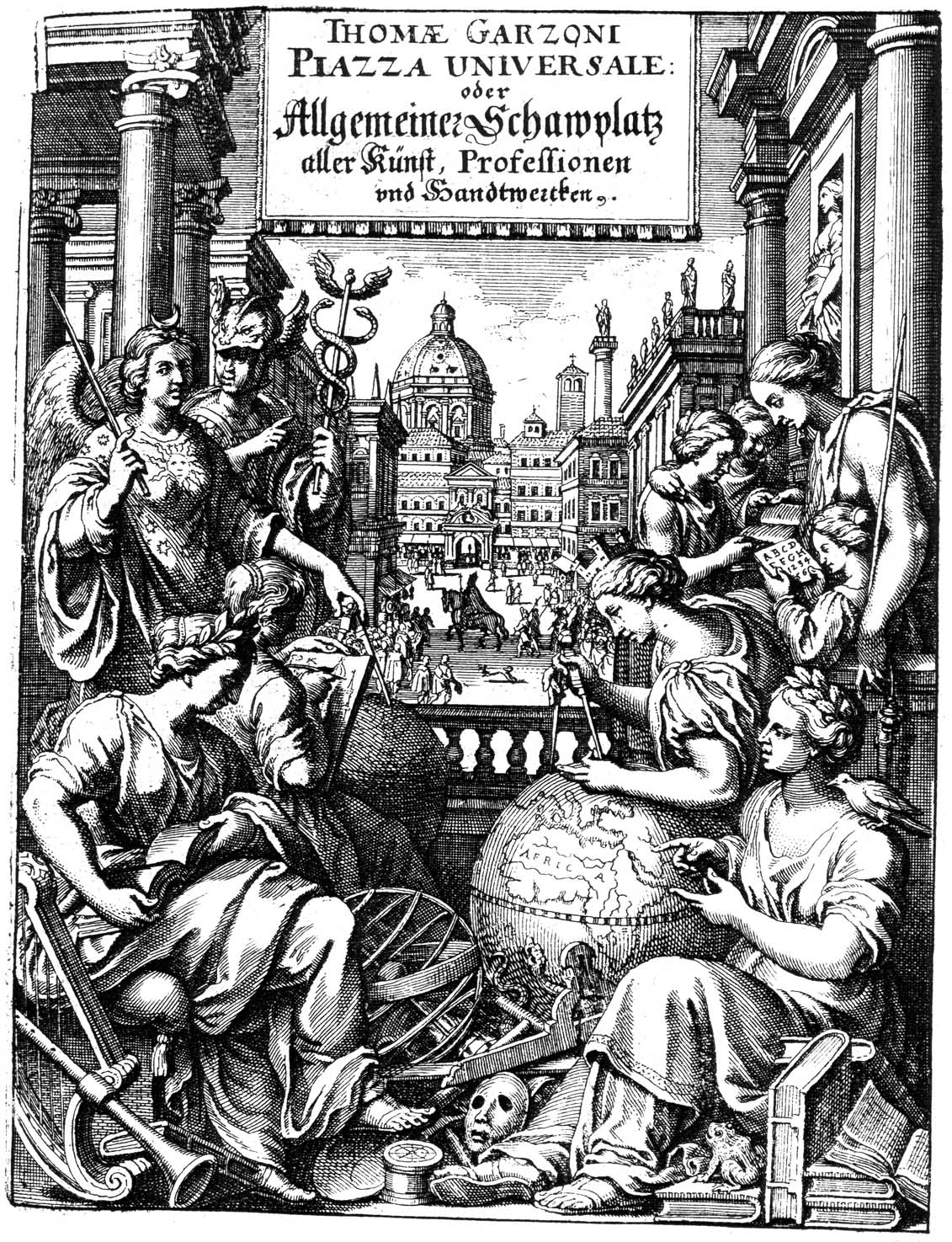
Title page of Garzoni's Piazza universale (German edition, 1659)

In Italian

- Il Theatro de' vari, e diversi cervelli mondani, Venezia, 1583
- La piazza universale di tutte le professioni del mondo, Venezia, 1585
- L'hospidale de pazzi incurabili, Venezia, 1586
- Le vite delle donne illustri della Scrittura sacra, Venezia, 1586
- La sinagoga de gl'ignoranti, Venezia, 1589
- Il mirabile cornucopia consolatorio, Bologna, 1601 (posthumous)
- L'huomo astratto, Venezia, 1604 (posthumous)
- Il serraglio de gli stupori del mondo, Venezia, 1613 (posthumous)

Translations in French

- Le Théâtre des divers cerveaux du monde, translated by Gabriel Chappuys, Paris, J. Houzé, 1586
- L'Hospital des fols incurables, où sont déduites de poinct en poinct toutes les folies et les maladies d'esprit, tant des hommes que des femmes, translated by François de Clarier, sieur de Longval, Paris, F. Julliot, L. Sevestre, 1620
- L'hospidale de’ pazzi incurabili, 2001

Translations in English

- The Hospital of Incurable Madness. L'Hospedale de' Pazzi Incurabili (1586), by Tomas Garzoni, 2009

Translations in German

- Spital unheylsamer Narren und Närrinnen Herrn Thomasi Garzoni, auss der italiänischen Sprach teutsch gemacht durch Georgium Fridericum Messerschmid, Strassburg, J. Carolo, 1618
- Piazza universale, das ist allgemeiner Schawplatz, Marckt und Zusammenkunfft aller Professionen, Künsten, Geschäfften, Händeln und Handtwerken... erstmaln durch Thomam Garzonum italianisch zusammengetragen, anjetzo [...] verdeutscht Frankfurt am Mayn, W. Hoffmanns Buchdruckerei, 1641

Translations in Latin

- Emporium universale, translated by Nic. Belli, Francfort, 1614 (Note: Translation referred to in Jacques-Charles Brunet, Manuel du libraire, Paris, 1842, t. II, p. 367-368.)

Translations in Spanish

- Plaza universal de todas sciencias y artes, parte traduzida de toscano [de Thomaso Garzoni] y parte compuesta por el doctor Christóval Suárez de Figueroa, Perpiñan, 1630
