= National Theatre =

National Theatre or National Theater may refer to:

== Africa ==
- Ethiopian National Theatre, Addis Ababa
- National Theatre of Ghana, Accra
- Kenya National Theatre, Nairobi
- National Arts Theatre, Lagos, Nigeria
- National Theatre of Somalia, Mogadishu
- National Theatre (Sudan), Omdurman
- National Theatre of Tunisia, Tunis
- National Theatre of Uganda, Kampala

== Asia ==
=== Japan ===
- National Theatre of Japan, Tokyo
- New National Theatre Tokyo
- National Noh Theatre, Tokyo
- National Bunraku Theatre, Osaka
- National Theater Okinawa, Urasoe, designed by Shin Takamatsu

=== Other Asian countries ===
- National Theatre of Yangon, Burma
- Preah Suramarit National Theatre, Phnom Penh, Cambodia
- Habima Theatre, Tel Aviv, Israel
- Palestinian National Theatre, Jerusalem
- National Theater and Concert Hall, Taipei, Taiwan
- National Theatre, Singapore
- National Theater of Korea, Seoul, South Korea
- National Theatre (Thailand)

== Oceania ==
- National Theatre, a defunct theatre company in Perth (1956–1984) which reconstituted as the Western Australian Theatre Company
- National Theatre, Launceston, Tasmania, Australia
- National Theatre, Melbourne, Victoria, Australia
- National Theatre Company (Papua New Guinea)
- National Theatre, Sydney, New South Wales, Australia
- National Theatre of Parramatta, a professional theatre company based in Parramatta, New South Wales

== Europe ==
=== Albania ===
- National Theatre of Albania, Tirana
- National Theatre of Opera and Ballet of Albania, Tirana

=== Bosnia and Herzegovina ===
- National Theatre Mostar
- Bosnian National Theatre Zenica
- Sarajevo National Theatre

=== Czech Republic ===
- National Theatre Brno
- National Theatre (Prague)
  - National Theatre Ballet (Prague)

=== Germany ===
- Deutsches Nationaltheater and Staatskapelle Weimar
- National Theatre Mannheim
- National Theatre Munich

=== France ===
- Comédie-Française (Paris)
- National Theatre of Strasbourg
- Odéon-Théâtre de l'Europe
- National Theatre of Chaillot (Paris)
- Théâtre national de la Colline (Paris)
- Théâtre national de l'Opéra-Comique (Paris)

=== Greece ===
- National Theatre of Greece, Athens
- National Theatre of Northern Greece, Thessaloniki

=== Hungary ===
- National Theatre (Budapest)
- National Theatre of Győr
- National Theatre of Miskolc
- National Theatre of Pécs
- National Theatre of Szeged

=== Lithuania ===
- National Kaunas Drama Theatre

=== Netherlands ===
- Koninklijke Schouwburg, a building in The Hague
- Het Nationale Theater, a theater company in The Hague

=== Portugal ===
- D. Maria II National Theatre, Lisbon
- São João National Theatre, Porto

=== Romania ===
- National Theatre Bucharest
- Cluj-Napoca National Theatre
- Iași National Theatre

=== Serbia ===
- National Theatre in Belgrade
- National Theatre in Niš
- Serbian National Theatre, Novi Sad
- National Theatre in Subotica
- National Theatre "Toša Jovanović", Zrenjanin

=== Spain ===
- National Theater Prize
- Centro Dramático Nacional, Madrid
- National Theatre of Catalonia, Barcelona

=== United Kingdom ===
- Royal National Theatre (also known simply as the National Theatre), London
- National Theatre of Brent, a British comedy theatre duo
- National Theatre of Cornwall, a proposal
- National Theatre of England, a theatre in London in existence from 1914 to 1915; see Peacock Theatre
- National Theatre of Scotland, a touring company
- National Theatre Wales, a former touring company with English-language productions
- Theatr Cymru (previously Theatr Genedlaethol Cymru), a touring company with Welsh-language productions
- Welsh National Theatre formed by Michael Sheen in 2025

=== Other European countries ===
- Burgtheater or Austrian National Theatre, Vienna, Austria
- Ivan Vazov National Theatre, Sofia, Bulgaria
- Croatian National Theatre (disambiguation), several theatres in Croatia
- Finnish National Theatre, Helsinki, Finland
- National Theatre of Iceland, Reykjavík, Iceland
- Abbey Theatre, also known as the National Theatre of Ireland, Dublin, Ireland
- Latvian National Theatre, Riga, Latvia
- Montenegrin National Theatre, Podgorica, Montenegro
- National Theatre (Oslo), Norway
- National Theatre, Warsaw, Poland
- Slovak National Theatre, Bratislava, Slovakia
- Slovene National Theatre (disambiguation), several theatres in Slovenia

== The Americas ==
=== Mexico ===
- National Theatre of Mexico, Mexico City
- National Theatre Company of Mexico, Mexico City

=== United States ===
- American National Theater and Academy, a congressionally chartered non-profit theatre producer
- National Theatre Conservatory, Denver, Colorado
- National Theatre, Boston (1836), Massachusetts
- National Theatre, Boston (1911), Massachusetts
- National Theatre (Detroit, Michigan)
- National Theatre, a short-lived playhouse (1836–1841) originally built in 1833 as Lorenzo Da Ponte's Italian Opera House, New York City
- National Theatre (New York), former name of the Nederlander Theatre in New York City, New York
- National Theater of the United States of America, a company in New York City, New York
- National Theater (Manhattan), former Yiddish theatre in New York City, New York
- National Theater (Richmond, Virginia)
- National Theatre (Washington, D.C.)
- National Theatres, a predecessor of National General Corporation

=== Other countries in the Americas ===
- Teatro Nacional Cervantes or Cervantes National Theatre, Buenos Aires, Argentina
- Cláudio Santoro National Theater, Brasília, Brazil
- National Theatre School of Canada, Montreal, Canada
- Teatro de Cristóbal Colón, Bogotá, Colombia
- National Theatre of Costa Rica, San Jose, Costa Rica
- National Theatre of Cuba, Havana, Cuba
- Teatro Nacional (Santo Domingo), Dominican Republic
- Teatro Nacional de El Salvador, San Salvador, El Salvador
- Rubén Darío National Theatre, Managua, Nicaragua
- National Theatre of Panama, Panama City, Panama
- Gran Teatro Nacional, Lima, Peru
- Sodre National Auditorium, Montevideo, Uruguay
- National Theatre of Venezuela, Caracas, Venezuela

== See also ==
- List of national theatres, theaters supported at least in part by national funds
- Teatro Nacional (disambiguation), National Theatre in Spanish and Portuguese
- National Theatre of the Deaf, a US touring company
- National Theatre of Brent, a British comedy double act
- Nationalteatern, a Swedish rock group
