= List of national theatres =

Numerous countries operate one or more national theatres supported in part by national or federal funds. Founded in 1680, the Comédie-Française in Paris is widely considered to be the world's first national theatre.

- Albania: National Theatre of Albania
- Argentina: Teatro Nacional Cervantes
- Australia:
  - National Theatre in St Kilda, Victoria
  - National Theatre in Launceston, Tasmania
- Austria: Burgtheater in Vienna
- Bosnia and Herzegovina:
  - Sarajevo National Theatre
  - Bosnian National Theatre in Zenica
  - National Theatre Mostar
  - Croatian National Theatre in Mostar
- Brazil:
  - Teatro Nacional Cláudio Santoro in Brasília
  - Theatro Municipal do Rio de Janeiro
- Bulgaria: Ivan Vazov National Theatre
- Canada: National Arts Centre of Canada in Ottawa
- Catalonia: Teatre Nacional de Catalunya in Barcelona
- China: National Centre for the Performing Arts in Beijing
- Costa Rica: Teatro Nacional de Costa Rica
- Croatia: Croatian National Theatres, including
  - Croatian National Theatre in Zagreb
  - Croatian National Theatre in Split
  - Croatian National Theatre in Osijek
  - Croatian National Theatre in Rijeka
  - Croatian National Theatre in Varaždin
  - Croatian National Theatre in Šibenik
  - Croatian National Theatre in Zadar
- Czech Republic:
  - National Theatre in Prague
  - National Theatre in Brno
  - National Moravian-Silesian Theatre in Ostrava
- Denmark: Royal Danish Theater
  - The Old Stage, Kongens Nytorv
  - Copenhagen Opera House
  - Royal Danish Playhouse
  - Stærekassen
- El Salvador: Teatro Nacional de El Salvador, San Salvador
- Ethiopia: Ethiopian National Theatre, Addis Ababa
- Finland: Finnish National Theatre
- France:
  - Comédie-Française
  - Odéon-Théâtre de l'Europe
  - Théâtre national de la Colline
  - National Theatre of Strasbourg (Théâtre national de Strasbourg)
  - Théâtre national de Chaillot
  - Théâtre national de l'Opéra Comique
- Germany: The National Theatres in Munich, in Mannheim and in Weimar
- Ghana: National Theatre in Accra
- Greece: National Theatre in Athens and the National Theatre of Northern Greece in Thessaloniki
- Hungary: The National Theatres in Budapest, Győr, Miskolc, Pécs and Szeged
- Iceland: Þjóðleikhúsið (National Theatre), Reykjavík
- India: National Theatre (Kolkata), Kolkata
- Ireland: The Abbey Theatre, Dublin
- Israel: Habima Theatre, Tel Aviv
- Italy: National Dramatic Theatre, Rome
- Japan:
  - National Theatre, Tokyo
  - New National Theatre, Tokyo
  - National Noh Theatre, Tokyo
  - National Bunraku Theatre, Osaka
  - National Theater Okinawa, Urasoe
- Kenya: Kenya National Theatre
- Kosovo: National Theatre of Kosovo, Pristina
- Latvia: Latvian National Theatre, Riga
- Malaysia: National Theater in Kuala Lumpur
- Mali: Palais de la Culture Amadou Hampaté Ba
- Malta: Manoel Theatre, Valletta
- Mexico: National Theatre of Mexico, Mexico City
- Moldova:
  - Bălți National Theatre
  - Chişinău National Theatre, Chişinău
- Montenegro: Montenegrin National Theatre, Podgorica
- Netherlands: Het Nationale Theater, The Hague
- Myanmar: National Theatre of Yangon, National Theatre of Mandalay
- Norway: Nationaltheatret (National Theatre) in Oslo
- Nigeria: National Arts Theatre in Lagos
- Philippines: Tanghalang Pambansa (National Theater) in the Cultural Center of the Philippines Complex, Manila
- Poland: Teatr Narodowy in Warsaw
- Portugal:
  - Teatro Nacional D. Maria II in Lisbon
  - Teatro Nacional de São Carlos in Lisbon
  - Teatro Nacional São João in Porto
- Republic of Ireland: The National English language Theatre of Ireland in Dublin is more commonly called the Abbey Theatre. The National Irish language Theatre is the Taibhdhearc in Galway.
- Romania:
  - National Theatre Bucharest
  - Cluj-Napoca National Theatre
  - Iaşi National Theatre
- Serbia:
  - National Theatre in Belgrade
  - Serbian National Theatre in Novi Sad
- Slovakia:
  - Slovak National Theatre
  - National Theatre Košice
- Slovenia:
  - Ljubljana Slovene National Theatre Drama
  - Maribor Slovene National Theatre
  - Nova Gorica Slovene National Theatre
- Sri Lanka: Navarangahala in Colombo
- Somalia: National Theatre of Somalia in Mogadishu
- South Korea: National Theater of Korea in Seoul
- Spain:
  - Centro Dramático Nacional in Madrid
  - Compañía Nacional de Teatro Clásico in Madrid
  - Teatre Nacional de Catalunya in Barcelona, Catalonia
  - Teatro de la Zarzuela in Madrid
- Sweden: Royal Dramatic Theatre, Stockholm
- Taiwan:
  - National Kaohsiung Center for the Arts, Kaohsiung
  - National Theater and Concert Hall, Taipei
  - National Taichung Theater, Taichung
- Thailand: National Theatre of Thailand in Bangkok
- Turkey: Turkish State Theatres
- Uganda: National Theatre of Uganda
- United Arab Emirates: National Theater in Abu Dhabi
- United Kingdom:
  - England: Royal National Theatre, London
  - Scotland: National Theatre of Scotland
  - Wales: National Theatre Wales
    Theatr Cymru (Welsh Language)
- Uruguay: Sodre National Auditorium
- National Theatre of Venezuela

== See also ==
- National Theatre, a list of similarly named venues and companies
