= Teatro Nacional =

Teatro Nacional (Spanish and Portuguese: 'National Theatre') may refer to:

- Teatro Nacional Cervantes, Argentina
- Cláudio Santoro National Theater, Brasília, Brazil
- National Theatre of Costa Rica, San José, Costa Rica
- National Theatre of Cuba, Cuba
- Eduardo Brito National Theater, Santo Domingo, Dominican Republic
- Teatro Nacional de El Salvador, San Salvador, El Salvador
- Centro Cultural Miguel Ángel Asturias, Guatemala City, Guatemala
- Gran Teatro Nacional (Mexico), Mexico City, Mexico
- Rubén Darío National Theatre, Managua, Nicaragua
- National Theatre of Panama, Panama City, Panama
- Gran Teatro Nacional del Perú, Lima, Peru
- D. Maria II National Theatre, Lisbon, Portugal
- Teatro Nacional de São Carlos, Lisbon, Portugal
- São João National Theatre, Porto, Portugal
- Theatre of María Guerrero, Madrid, Spain
- Teatre Nacional de Catalunya, Barcelona, Spain
- National Theatre of Venezuela, Venezuela
