= Barry Ife =

Sir Barry Ife CBE
- Born: Barry William Ife; 19 June 1947 (age 79)
- Education: King’s College London (BA); Birkbeck, University of London (PhD)
- Occupations: Cultural historian; academic leader
- Known for: Principal of the Guildhall School of Music and Drama (2004–2017); Cervantes Professor of Spanish, King’s College London; research on Spanish culture and Domenico Scarlatti
- Awards: CBE (2000); Knight Bachelor (2017); Knight Commander of the Order of Isabella the Catholic (2021)

Sir Barry William Ife CBE (born 19 June 1947) is a British cultural historian and academic leader. He was Cervantes Professor of Spanish at King’s College London from 1988 to 2004 and Principal of the Guildhall School of Music and Drama from 2004 to 2017, where he is now a Research Professor. His research concerns the literature, history and music of Spain and Spanish America from the fifteenth to the eighteenth centuries, including the work of Cervantes and the keyboard sonatas of Domenico Scarlatti. He was appointed CBE in 2000 for services to Hispanic studies, was knighted in 2017 for services to performing arts education and was made a Knight Commander of the Spanish Order of Isabella the Catholic in 2021.

At King’s he was also Head of the School of Humanities, Vice-Principal and Acting Principal, and King’s own account of its digital humanities credits him with supporting that field’s growth. At the Guildhall School he led the application for taught degree-awarding powers and strengthened the school’s partnership with the Barbican Centre.

== Early life and education ==
Ife was educated at the Sweyne School in Rayleigh, Essex, and gained the Associate diploma of the London College of Music in 1965. He studied Spanish with French at King’s College London, graduating BA with first-class honours in 1968. He received a PhD from Birkbeck, University of London, in 1984.

== Academic career ==
=== Early academic career ===
Ife was assistant lecturer in Spanish at the University of Nottingham from 1969, and a lecturer at Birkbeck, University of London, from 1972 to 1988. At Birkbeck he served on the committee chaired by Sir Barney Hayhoe that considered how the college could survive a financial crisis. He was secretary to the committee’s drafting sub-committee in 1986–87 and drafted the college’s academic plan in 1987. From 1985 to 1987 he was General Secretary of the National Council for Modern Languages. He held a Leverhulme research fellowship in 1983–85 to study the impact of printing on the development of solo instrumental music before 1650.

=== King’s College London ===
In 1988 he returned to King’s College London as Cervantes Professor of Spanish. He was head of the School of Humanities from 1989 to 1996, Vice-Principal from 1997 to 2003, and Acting Principal in 2003–04. He initiated and oversaw capital projects at King’s including the conversion of the former Public Record Office into the Maughan Library. He holds the title of Cervantes Professor Emeritus.

As head of the School of Humanities, Ife led the creation of a single school from three separate faculties; student numbers in the school rose from about 1,200 to 2,500 and staff from 120 to 180 during his headship. As Vice-Principal he deputised for the Principal and led strategic planning, including the College’s strategic plans for 1998–2008 and 2001–2010. He led a £60 million bond issue that secured the first credit rating awarded to a UK university, an AA− from Standard & Poor’s, and led the restructuring of the College’s academic governance after its mergers with the Institute of Psychiatry (1997) and the United Medical and Dental Schools of Guy’s and St Thomas’ Hospitals (1998). Among the academic initiatives he began were film studies, medicine and the arts and the School of Social Science and Public Policy.

King’s own account of the development of digital humanities at the College, including the Centre for Computing in the Humanities, credits the shared vision of the centre’s senior members and the College’s senior management, singling out Ife during his time as Head of the School of Humanities, Vice-Principal and Acting Principal. He also developed teaching and research partnerships between King’s and arts organisations, including the Royal Academy of Music, the Royal Academy of Dramatic Art, Shakespeare’s Globe, the British Film Institute, the National Film Theatre, the Royal National Theatre, the Institute of Contemporary Arts and the Courtauld Institute of Art. In 2001 King’s and Shakespeare’s Globe launched a joint MA in Shakespeare Studies, the first master’s degree in the subject to be taught jointly by a university and a theatre. As a governor of the Royal Academy of Music (1996–2004) and manager of the validation relationship between King’s and RADA, he gained wide experience of the performing arts sector, and in 2001 he facilitated the transfer of RADA and the London Academy of Music and Dramatic Art from the further to the higher education sector in partnership with King’s.

== Guildhall School of Music and Drama ==
Ife became Principal of the Guildhall School of Music and Drama in September 2004 and held the post until January 2017. During this period the school gained taught degree-awarding powers, incorporated the Centre for Young Musicians, set up music education hubs in Norfolk and Somerset, and received Queen’s Anniversary Prizes in 2005 and 2007. The school’s Milton Court development, which includes performance venues, rehearsal and teaching spaces, opened in September 2013; as Principal, Ife reported to the school’s Board of Governors on its fundraising and completion.

The Privy Council granted the school taught degree-awarding powers in April 2014, following an application led by Ife. In August 2006 the school had been designated a higher education institution, from which time it received teaching funding from the Higher Education Funding Council for England. Ife also revived and strengthened the school’s partnerships with performing arts organisations including the Barbican Centre and the London Symphony Orchestra. In October 2009 the school and the Barbican brought their creative learning work together in a joint Creative Learning Division, and the relationship between the two institutions is the subject of Peter Renshaw’s 2017 study Collaboration: Myth or Reality? Through the Eyes of the Barbican and Guildhall School.

After retiring as Principal he remained at the school as an honorary senior research fellow, and since 2020 as Research Professor.

== Other roles ==
Ife has sat on the board of Universities UK, representing specialist institutions, and chaired its Specialist Institutions Forum. He was president of the Incorporated Society of Musicians in 2014–15 and has been chairman of the Culture Capital Exchange. He chaired the board of Saffron Hall Trust from 2019, and is president of the British Harpsichord Society.

== Research ==
Ife’s first major book, Reading and Fiction in Golden-Age Spain (Cambridge University Press, 1985), examined Spanish Golden Age objections to prose fiction, which echoed Plato’s, and the picaresque novel’s responses to them. It was reviewed in Renaissance Quarterly. He was general editor of the Aris & Phillips edition of Cervantes’s Exemplary Novels and edited and translated Christopher Columbus’s journal of the first voyage. He also edited the Corpus of Contemporary Spanish, a 5,250,000-word electronic database of contemporary Spanish on CD-ROM produced at King’s College London. From 1999 to 2002 the Arts and Humanities Research Board funded his project “Towards a History of the Novel in Early-Modern Spain”, and he has been a frequent contributor to the Times Literary Supplement on Spanish literature, drama and film. In 2006 he was a guest on BBC Radio 4’s In Our Time in an episode on Don Quixote.

Ife is also a harpsichordist and has published on early Spanish keyboard music, including the three-volume Early Spanish Keyboard Music (Oxford University Press, 1986), edited with Roy Truby. In 2022 the Leverhulme Trust awarded him a Research Project Grant of £409,411 for “Texting Scarlatti: composition, reception, performance”. The project, which began in January 2023, used computational methods to study over 3,000 surviving eighteenth-century manuscript and printed copies of Scarlatti’s keyboard sonatas, with the assistance of an international team of researchers and volunteer “citizen scientists”. The project website publishes the full collations of some 3,300 surviving copies held in over 200 collections in about 50 libraries worldwide, and sets out the project’s methods. Its methods were also described in an article in the Journal of New Music Research in 2024.

== Honours ==
- CBE (2000), for services to Hispanic studies
- Honorary Fellow of the Royal Academy of Music (2001)
- Fellow of Birkbeck, University of London (2006)
- Knight Bachelor (2017 New Year Honours), for services to performing arts education
- Knight Commander of the Order of Isabella the Catholic (Spain), awarded by King Felipe VI (2021)
- He is also a Fellow of King’s College London, of the Royal College of Music (2013), of the Guildhall School (2016), and a Principal Fellow of the Higher Education Academy (2018).

== Personal life ==
After losing his hearing during the COVID-19 pandemic, Ife developed a serious interest in art history and began working on representations of Spain by English artist-travellers of the 1830s. In 2023 he co-curated, with the art historian Claudia Hopkins, the exhibition Impressions of Spain in the 1830s at the Maughan Library, King’s College London (14 September to 10 December 2023), with exhibits drawn largely from his own library of books on Spain. His Spanish library has been bequeathed to the Foyle Special Collections Library at King’s.

== Selected publications ==
- Reading and Fiction in Golden-Age Spain. Cambridge University Press, 1985. ISBN 0-521-30375-3.
- (with Roy Truby) Early Spanish Keyboard Music, 3 vols. Oxford University Press, 1986.
- (ed. and trans.) Christopher Columbus: Journal of the First Voyage. Warminster: Aris & Phillips, 1990.
- (general ed.) Miguel de Cervantes: Exemplary Novels, 4 vols. Warminster: Aris & Phillips, 1992; new edition with Jonathan Thacker, 2013.
- ‘The literary impact of the New World: Columbus to Carrizales’, Journal of the Institute of Romance Studies, 3 (1995), 65–85.
- ‘The Historical and Social Context’ in Anthony Cascardi, ed., The Cambridge Companion to Cervantes (Cambridge: Cambridge University Press, 2002), pp. 11–31.
- (with Trudi L. Darby) ‘Remorse, Retribution and Redemption in La fuerza de la sangre: Spanish and English Perspectives’, in A Companion to Cervantes’s Novelas ejemplares, ed. Stephen Boyd (Woodbridge: Tamesis, 2005), pp. 172–190.
- ‘Cervantes and Shakespeare: asymmetrical conversations’ in Cervantes y/and Shakespeare. Nuevas interpretaciones y aproximaciones comparativas, ed. José Manuel González Fernández de Sevilla (Alicante: University of Alicante, 2006), pp. 21–49.
- ‘Culture Wars or Cultural Diplomacy? The Politics of Scarlatti’s Essercizi’ in ‘Cedere il passo al sogno’: l’esperienza musicale di Emilia Fadini. Studi e contributi offerti in occasione del 90^{o} compleanno, ed. by Marco Moiraghi (Lucca: LIM, 2020), pp. 47–58.
- ‘Carmen’s Intertexts: Cervantes, Viardot, Mérimée, Bizet’ in Song in the Novel, ed. by Jennifer Rushworth, Hannah Scott and Barry Ife. Proceedings of the British Academy 265 (Oxford: Oxford University Press for The British Academy, 2024), pp. 94–114.
- (with J. van der Klis and others) “Texting Scarlatti: unlocking a standard edition with a digital toolkit”. Journal of New Music Research, 53 (3–4), 259–276 (2024). doi:10.1080/09298215.2024.2408266.
