= Croatian National Theatre =

Croatian National Theatre (Croatian: Hrvatsko narodno kazalište) is the official name of several state-funded theatre houses in Croatia. Each one is commonly referred to by the Croatian-language initialism HNK. The four theatre houses in biggest cities (Zagreb, Split, Rijeka and Osijek) are considered premier theatre and opera houses in the country. In addition, there are three other smaller theatres carrying that name in Croatia (in Šibenik, Varaždin and Zadar) and one in Bosnia and Herzegovina (in Mostar).

Hence it may refer to:

- Croatian National Theatre in Rijeka ("HNK Zajc" or "HNK Rijeka"), located in Rijeka; not to be confused with HNK Rijeka (the football club)
- Croatian National Theatre in Mostar ("HNK Mostar"), a theatre located in Mostar, home to the largest population of Croats in Bosnia and Herzegovina
- Croatian National Theatre in Osijek ("HNK Osijek"), a theatre building in Osijek, capital of the Croatian region of Slavonia
- Croatian National Theatre in Šibenik ("HNK Šibenik"), located in Šibenik; not to be confused with HNK Šibenik (the football club)
- Croatian National Theatre in Split ("HNK Split"), a theatre located in Split, Croatia. Originally opened in 1893, the theatre is owned and operated by the City of Split and is one of the oldest surviving theatres in Dalmatia
- Croatian National Theatre in Varaždin ("HNK Varaždin"), located in Varaždin
- Croatian National Theatre in Zadar ("HNK Zadar"), located in Zadar
- Croatian National Theatre in Zagreb ("HNK Zagreb"), a theatre located in Zagreb, owned and operated by the Ministry of Culture

It may also refer to other theatre houses which carried that name in the past:

- National Theatre in Subotica, located in Subotica in Serbia. Known as the "Croatian National Theatre in Subotica" 1945–1954
- Sarajevo National Theatre, located in Sarajevo, Bosnia and Herzegovina; known as the "Croatian State Theatre in Sarajevo" 1941–1945
