= Slovene National Theatre =

There are four theatres called Slovensko narodno gledališče (SNG):

- Ljubljana Slovene National Theatre Drama
- Ljubljana Slovene National Theatre Opera and Ballet
- Maribor Slovene National Theatre
