= National Theatre (Sudan) =

The Sudanese National Theatre is a theatre company established in 1959. It is situated in Omdurman, Sudan.
