= Journal of New Music Research =

- Language: English
- Edited by: Johanna Devaney; David Meredith

Publication details
- Former name(s): Interface
- History: 1972-present
- Publisher: Routledge
- Frequency: Quarterly
- Impact factor: 1.113 (2021)

Standard abbreviations
- ISO 4: J. New Music Res.

Indexing
- CODEN: JNEMEE
- ISSN: 0929-8215 (print); 1744-5027 (web)
- LCCN: 94649792
- OCLC no.: 681042287

Links
- Journal homepage; Online access; Online archive

Journal of New Music Research is a peer-reviewed academic journal covering research on musicology (including music theory), philosophy, psychology, acoustics, computer science, engineering, and other disciplines. Articles deal with theory, analysis, composition, performance, uses of music, instruments, and other music technologies. The journal was established in 1972 under the title Interface and is published by Routledge. The editors-in-chief are Johanna Devaney (Brooklyn College and the Graduate Center, CUNY) and David Meredith (Aalborg University).

== Abstracting and indexing ==
The journal is abstracted and indexed in:

- Arts & Humanities Citation Index
- Current Contents/Arts & Humanities
- Current Contents/Social & Behavioral Sciences
- Répertoire International de Littérature Musicale
- Scopus
- Science Citation Index Expanded

According to the Journal Citation Reports, the journal has a 2011 impact factor of 0.481.
