= National Theatre, Launceston =

Theatre in Launceston, Tasmania

National Theatre
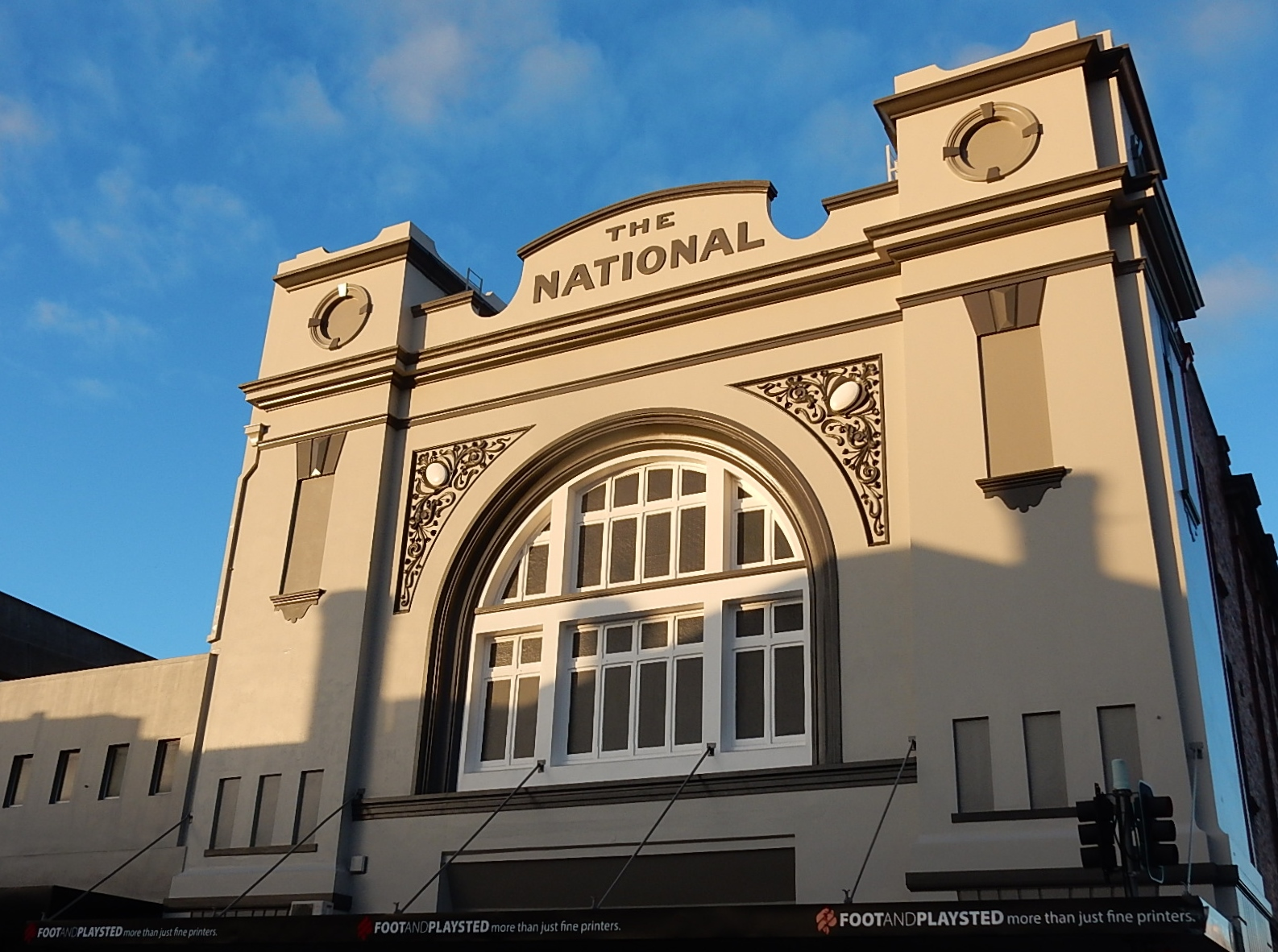
- The National Theatre in 2016
- Interactive map of National Theatre
- Address: 99 Charles Street; Launceston, Tasmania; Australia
- Coordinates: 41°26′13.1″S 147°8′11.67″E
- Owner: Foot & Playsted
- Capacity: 1,100

Construction
- Opened: 25 September 1915; 110 years ago
- Closed: 1970; 56 years ago
- Years active: 1915–1948, 1951-1970
- Architect: Thomas Searell

Website
- Official site

Tasmanian Heritage Register
- Place ID: 3,971
- Status: Permanently Registered

The National Theatre is a historic former theatre in Launceston, Tasmania, Australia.

== History ==
Located on the corner of Charles Street and Paterson Street, the National Theatre was formally opened on 25 September 1915 by Mayor Alderman Percy Hart, whose wife Margaret raised the curtain for a production of The Silence of Dean Maitland staged by the George Marlow Dramatic Company. The National was used for theatre productions, films, ballet, opera, and sporting events such as boxing and wrestling. Early theatrical performances and amusements included Harry Lauder, Roy Rene and Annette Kellerman. Classical music and operatic productions included Eileen Joyce, Ignaz Friedman, Essie Ackland, Rudolf Pekárek, John Brownlee, Peter Dawson and brothers Jascha Spivakovsky and Tossy Spivakovsky.

In 1934, the National was remodelled to address safety and accessibility issues, which saw the stage dropped to ground level, the stalls lowered and the Charles Street entrance stairs removed. The auditorium was updated with Australian-made Raycophone sound technology, and the National reopened as a talkie with The Head of the Family and Fashions of 1934.

Broadway theatre and Hollywood actor Mona Barrie appeared in theatrical performances at the National in the 1940s whilst contracted to J. C. Williamson's. Throughout the 1940s several ballet companies and personalities visited the theatre including the Borovansky Ballet, Bodenwieser Ballet and acclaimed Russian ballerina Tamara Tchinarova.

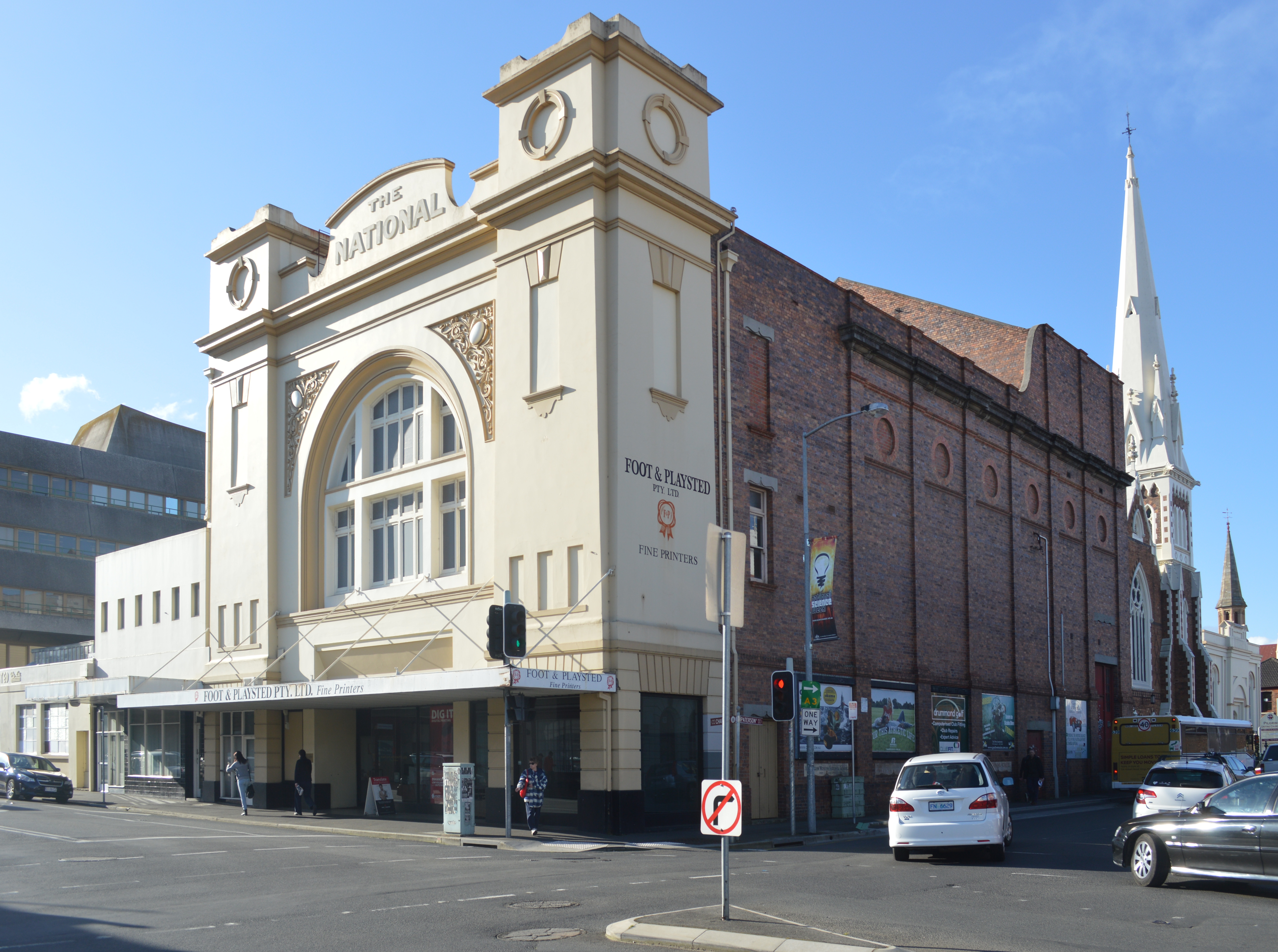
The National Theatre in 2015

=== Purchase by the Launceston City Council ===
Following the Second World War, the theatre fell into financial hardship and after several years of closure was purchased by the Launceston City Council (LCC) for £A17,000. Although the LCC proposed the theatre be renamed the Margaret McIntyre Memorial Theatre after Margaret McIntyre, the first female elected to the Parliament of Tasmania, this never eventuated. The theatre continued to be used to host international theatrical performances, live music, amusements, as well as amateur theatre productions. In 1951, the stage was damaged in a fire caused by experimentation with flash powder, causing over £A6,000 worth of damage. Following the refurbishment of Hobart's Theatre Royal in 1954, Minister for Health Reg Turnbull requested the LCC approach Premier Robert Cosgrove for a grant to restore the National Theatre. In 1958, South African actor Morry Barling suddenly died onstage. The theatre remained active throughout the 1960s, largely hosting performances by the Tasmanian Ballet Company.

=== Closure ===
Due to ongoing costs, the LCC decided to sell the theatre in 1969, although events continued into the next year. The Australian Elizabethan Theatre Trust premiered Ermanno Wolf-Ferrari's comedic opera School for Fathers, Welsh dramatist Emlyn Williams performed his one-man show on the life of Charles Dickens and world-renowned pianist Winifred Atwell gave the final performance at the theatre on 14 November 1970. The building was sold to the printing company Foot & Playsted.

== Contemporary use ==
The National Theatre has been greatly preserved by Foot & Playsted, who use the auditorium for storage.

The theatre hosted an event featuring Quandamooka artist Megan Cope and visual artist Thomas Demand as part of the arts festival MONA FOMA, curated by the Museum of Old and New Art, in 2022. The National was later included in programming by Open House Launceston later that year.

== See also ==
- List of entertainers who died during a performance
- List of national theatres
- List of theatres in Hobart
