= Anthony J. Cascardi =

Academic and author

- Occupations: Academic and author

Academic background
- Education: B.A., Princeton University; M.A., Harvard University; PhD, Harvard University

Anthony J. Cascardi is an academic and author. He is professor emeritus at the University of California, Berkeley, where he joined the faculty in 1980.

Cascardi's work centres on the intersections between literature and philosophy, aesthetic theory, and the European novel, with an emphasis on the early modern period and the works of Miguel de Cervantes. His books include The Subject of Modernity (1992), Consequences of Enlightenment (1999), Cervantes, Literature, and the Discourse of Politics (2011) and Francisco de Goya and the Art of Critique (2023), and he edited The Cambridge Companion to Cervantes. In 2013 the Renaissance Society of America awarded Cervantes, Literature, and the Discourse of Politics its Gordan Prize.

== Education and career ==
Cascardi graduated with Bachelor of Arts from Princeton University and a Master of Arts and Doctor of Philosophy in Romance languages and literatures from Harvard University.

Cascardi joined University of California, Berkeley as faculty in 1980. He was appointed chair of the departments of comparative literature and of rhetoric and held the first Richard and Rhoda Goldman Distinguished Professorship in the Humanities. Later, he became the Sidney and Margaret Ancker Distinguished Professorship. He became director of the Doreen B. Townsend Center for the Humanities in 2006. In 2011 he was named dean of the Division of Arts and Humanities in the College of Letters and Science. He stepped down in 2021, after ten years in the role. He holds the title of professor emeritus.

Cascardi is the general editor of the Cambridge University Press series Literature, Culture, Theory, as well as for the Cambridge Studies in Literature and Philosophy.

== Works ==
In Ideologies of History in the Spanish Golden Age, Cascardi examined the historical struggles between tradition and modernity in early modern Spanish literature. Stephen Rupp from the University of Toronto remarked that the book is "more consistent and unified than a standard set of collected essays". However, he noted that it does not cover the "history in nonfictional writing from the Golden Age". Jonathan Thacker of University College London wrote that the essays treat didactic literature, lyric poetry, the novel, romance, the short story and secular drama, and credited the book with stimulating insights. However, he considered that Cascardi's analysis played down the diversity of Golden Age dramatists' uses of history and imposed a reluctant sense of progression on a varied collection of essays.

In his 1999 publication, Consequences of Enlightenment, Cascardi examined the relationship between modern thought and Enlightenment principles through responses to Kant, particularly the Critique of Judgment. Holger Briel of the University of Surrey described the chapters as detailed and well argued and Chapter 2 as a "well-informed interpretation of Kant's writings" on the beautiful and the sublime, but wrote that Cascardi ultimately "fails to provide strictures which would pull his argument together". Bernadette Meyler characterized the book as having a "comprehensive scope" but that it was also difficult for her to distinguish whether the book attributes certain positions to Kant or to his interpreters. This book appeared in Chinese translation in 2006.

Cascardi's earlier, 1992 book, The Subject of Modernity, traced the history of modernity from Descartes and Hobbes onwards, examining the origins of the modern rational subject through the writings of Hobbes, Montaigne, and Cervantes, and the myth of Don Juan. Jeremy Tambling of the University of Hong Kong considered the periodization of change powerfully made and the passages on Cervantes and Don Quixote strong, but wrote that a sense of the "other" in the discourse of the subject was comparatively absent from the book. The book was translated into French and published as Subjectivité et Modernité by the Presses Universitaires de France in 1995.

Cascardi edited The Cambridge Companion to Cervantes, in which he and the contributing authors covered Cervantes' historical and social context, his place in Renaissance literature, and his lesser-known works. According to Thomas R. Hart, the book provided a "great deal of information about Cervantes" and introduced readers to a wide range of critical responses to his work, though he noted that it contains no discussion of translations of Don Quixote or of Cervantes's other works, and that some statements, including those on Cervantes's perspectivism, required qualification. Robert L. Fiore wrote that the volume studies a broad range of Cervantes's work and situates it historically within the wider context of early modern literature.

Together with Leah Middlebrook, Cascardi edited the collective volume Poiesis and Modernity in the Old and New Worlds, a collection of thirteen essays examining the Platonic concept of poiesis as used by writers and thinkers of early modern Spain and Latin America. Cascardi's own chapter treats poesía and poiesis in Cervantes. Michael W. Joy of Northern Michigan University observed that all of the essays are of "very high quality" and that the editors have managed to "avoid the pitfalls inherent in such a broad theme".

In his Cervantes, Literature, and the Discourse of Politics, he addressed the role of literature in the state, examining the political discourse running through Don Quixote and situating Cervantes between the idealism of classical political philosophy and the pragmatism of Machiavellian thought. According to Michael J. McGrath of Georgia Southern University, the book argues in a "brilliant and convincing" manner that Cervantes merits consideration alongside Hobbes, Locke, Montesquieu and Rousseau as an influential early modern political philosopher. Barbara Simerka of CUNY Queens College described it as providing an "illuminating commentary" on the influence of political philosophy on Cervantes's works, yet stated that "the thesis would be strengthened by more extensive discussions" of Castillo's book, di Salvo's work, and Osterc's study. The Renaissance Society of America awarded this work the Gordan Prize in 2013. In 2018, the work was translated into Spanish and published as Cervantes, la literatura y el discurso de la política.

== Selected books ==
- Cascardi, Anthony J. (1984). The Limits of Illusion : A Critical Study of Calderón. Cambridge University Press. ISBN 9780521262811.
- Cascardi, Anthony J. (1986). The Bounds of Reason: Cervantes, Dostoevsky, Flaubert. Columbia University Press, New York. ISBN 9780231062121.
- Cascardi, Anthony J. (1992). The Subject of Modernity. Cambridge University Press. ISBN 9780521423786.
- Cascardi, Anthony J. (1999). Consequences of Enlightenment. Cambridge University Press. ISBN 9780521484909.
- Cascardi, Anthony J. (2010). Ideologies of History in the Spanish Golden Age. Pennsylvania State University Press. ISBN 9780271043548.
- Cascardi, Anthony J. (2011). Cervantes, Literature, and the Discourse of Politics. University of Toronto Press. ISBN 9781442696778.
- Cascardi, Anthony J.; Middlebrook, Leah (2012). Poiesis and Modernity in the Old and New Worlds. Vanderbilt University Press. ISBN 9780826518347.
- Bernstein, J. M.; Brodsky, Claudia; Cascardi, Anthony J.; Duve, Thierry de; Erjavec, Ales; Erjavec, Aleš; Kaufman, Robert; Rush, Fred (2013). Art and Aesthetics After Adorno. Fordham University Press. ISBN 9780823290932.
- Cascardi, Anthony J. (2014). The Cambridge Introduction to Literature and Philosophy. Cambridge University Press. ISBN 9781107729049.
- Cascardi, Anthony J. (2023). Francisco de Goya and the Art of Critique. Zone Books. ISBN 9781942130697.
