= Croatian National Theatre, Mostar =

Croatian National Theatre in Mostar
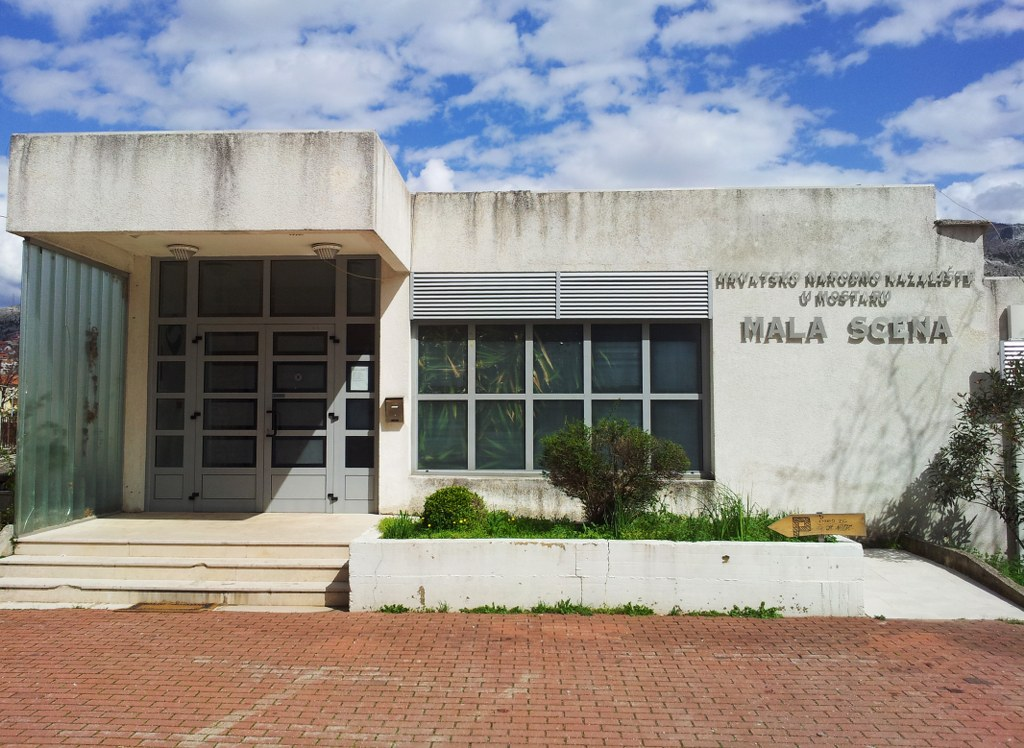
- Croatian National Theatre Mostar in Mostar
- Interactive map of Croatian National Theatre in Mostar
- Address: Kneza Domagoja bb Mostar; Bosnia and Herzegovina
- Coordinates: 43°20′39″N 17°48′25″E

Construction
- Opened: 22 September 1994

Website
- www.hnkmostar.ba

The Croatian National Theatre in Mostar (Croatian: Hrvatsko narodno kazalište u Mostaru) is a theatre located in Mostar, home to the largest population of Croats in Bosnia and Herzegovina.

HNK Mostar was established on September 22, 1994 and the foundations of its building were laid on January 30, 1996. In July 2011 the building was still undergoing construction and was incomplete. Croatian and local dramas are performed on the small stage in the basement (which is completed) and it is also the venue of the Croatian Puppet Theatre. Some of its goals include the promotion of Croatian culture in Bosnia and Herzegovina and abroad, as well as hosting international theatre troupes. All of its plays and performances are held on the small stage located in the building's basement. Half of its funding comes from the budget of Herzegovina-Neretva Canton (50%), while the other half comes from sponsors and donors. It currently has 25 employees and its theatre director (as of September 3, 2014) is Ivan Vukoja.

== See also ==
- Sarajevo National Theatre
- Croatian National Theatre in Zagreb
- National Theatre Mostar
