= National Theatre of Cuba =

Coordinates: 23°7′31.88″N 82°23′17.49″W

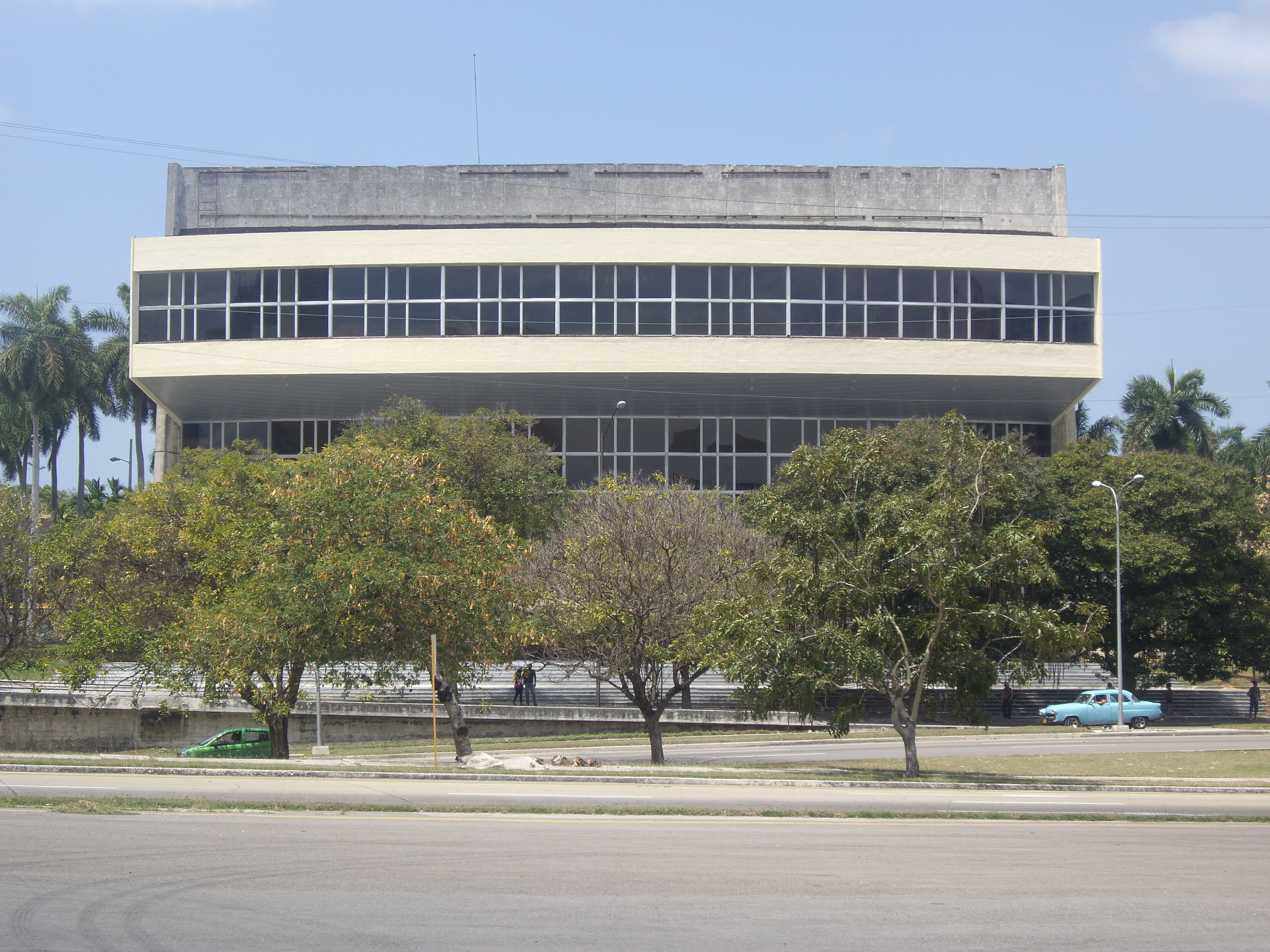

General information
- Type: Theatre
- Architectural style: International
- Groundbreaking: 1951
- Completed: 1979

Design and construction
- Architect: Julio Conesa
- Structural engineer: Purdy & Henderson

The National Theatre of Cuba (Spanish: Teatro Nacional de Cuba) is a theatre building in Havana, Cuba, on Plaza de la Revolución.

== History ==
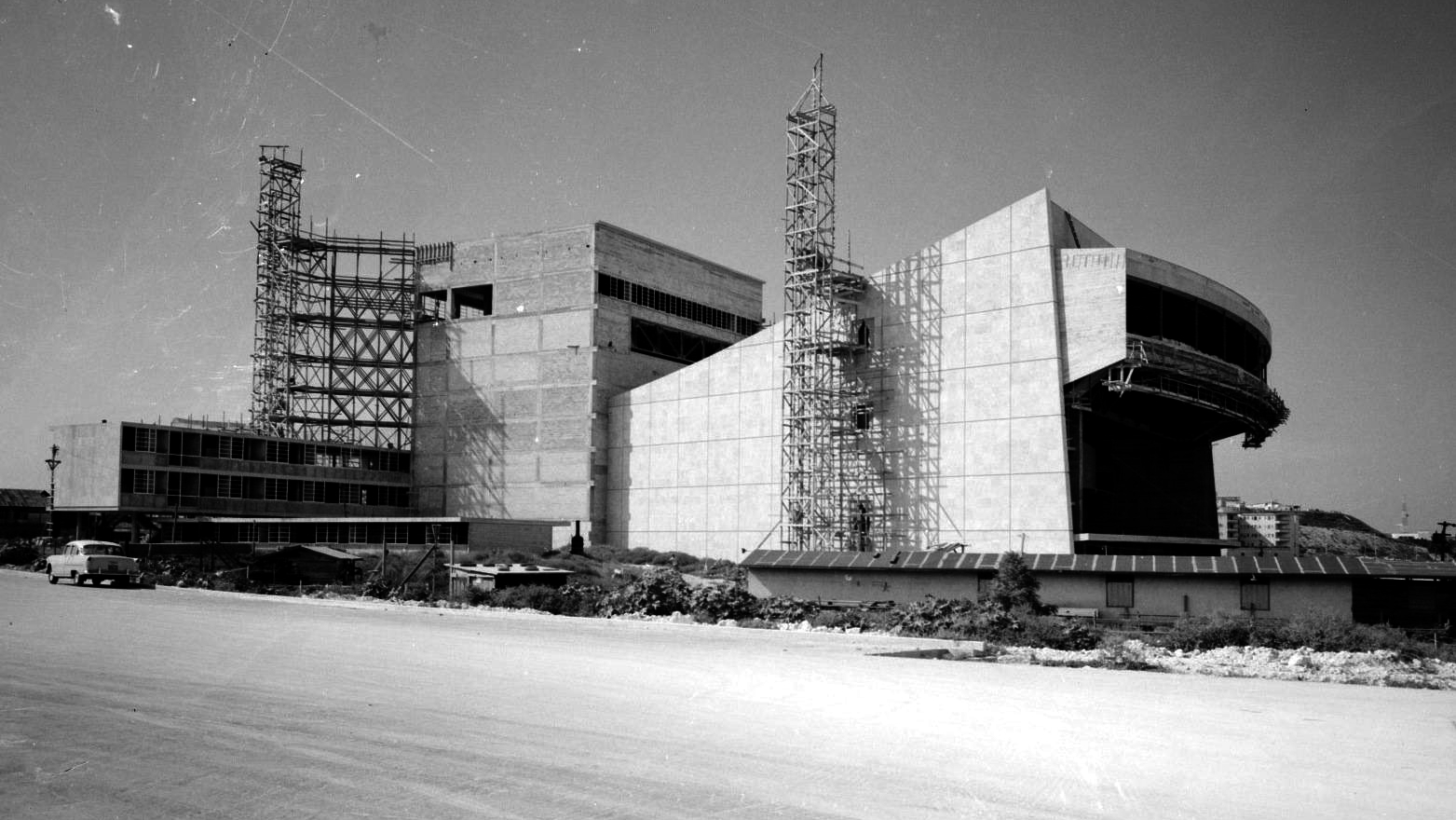
National Theatre of Cuba, July 19, 1957

Construction of the National Theater of Cuba was approved in 1951 under the administration of Carlos Prío Socarrás, work began the following year when President Fulgencio Batista laid the foundation stone.

The first stone for the construction of the National Theater was laid on July 29, 1952, two months later a contract was signed with the company Purdy & Henderson as civil contractor and with the firm Arroyo y Menéndez as technical and optional director of the work. The National Theater was inspired by Radio City Music Hall in New York and was conceived with three rooms: a large one for opera and ballet performances, a small one for dramatic theater, and an "experimental" room, as well as large rooms for dressing rooms, workshops, a library, and academies. It was projected as the largest theater in Cuba and was expected to be completed by July 1954, but the construction was so slow and discontinuous that in 1959, a large part of the work was yet to be done.

The National Theatre has two auditoriums, the Sala Covarrubias and the Sala Avellaneda. The two auditoriums have a combined capacity of 3,500 people, making it one of the largest theatres in the country. Events here include productions from the national ballet, theatre productions, musicals, and orchestra as well as a number of lectures and workshops.

In 1960, the Sala Covarrubias was inaugurated and a series of cultural activities were held during that year, but since March 1961 they stopped presenting shows due to their still precarious conditions, being destined to serve as a rehearsal room and, later, for storage of sets and furniture. It is not until the second half of the 1970s that the completion of the building is assumed, being its complete and definitive inauguration on September 3, 1979.

== Gallery ==
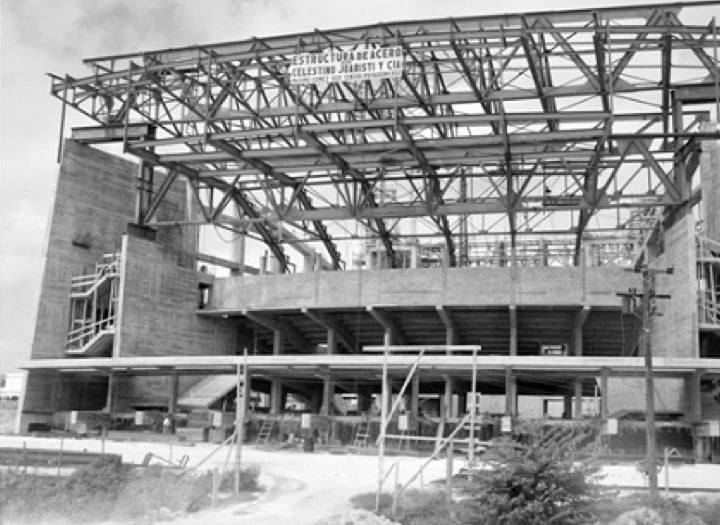
National Theatre of Cuba, Havana, Cuba.01

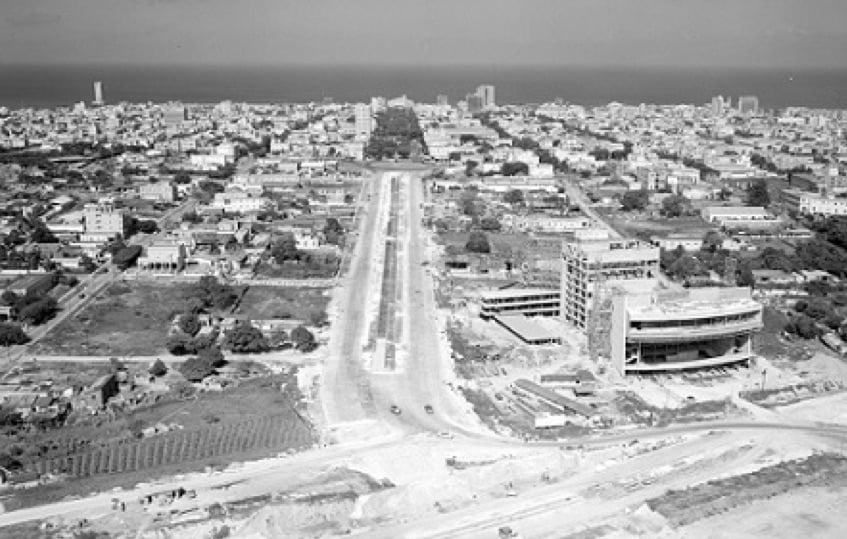
National Theatre of Cuba, Havana, Cuba.02

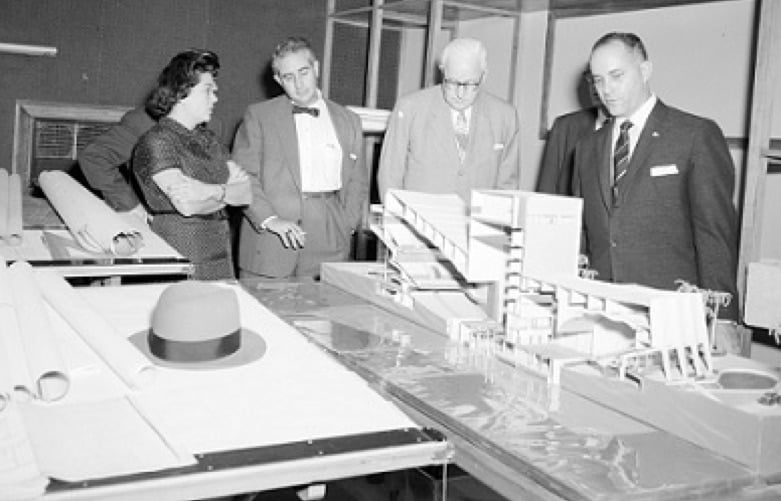
National Theatre of Cuba, Havana, Cuba.03

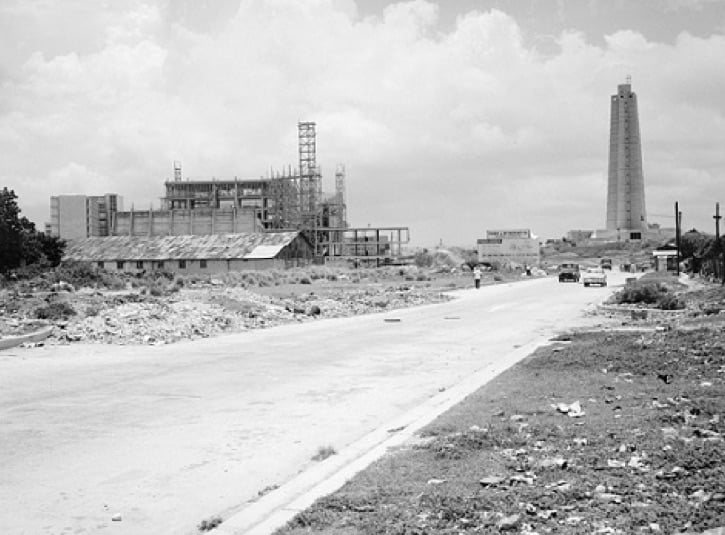
National Theatre of Cuba, Havana, Cuba.04

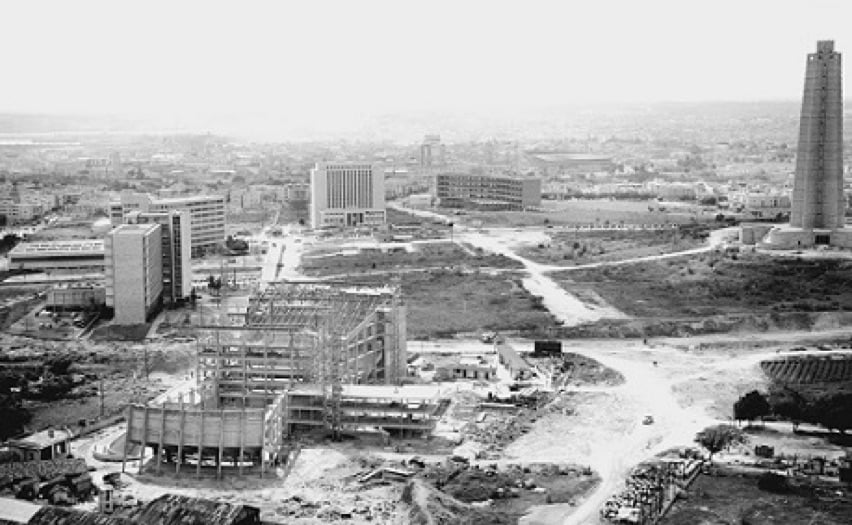
National Theatre of Cuba, Havana, Cuba.05

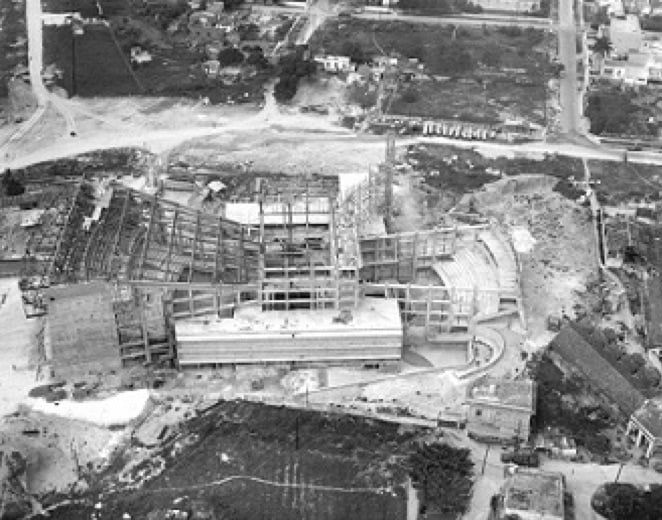
National Theatre of Cuba, Havana, Cuba.06

== See also ==
- Radio City Music Hall
- Purdy and Henderson
- Havana Plan Piloto
