= National Theatre of Győr =

Győri Nemzeti Színház
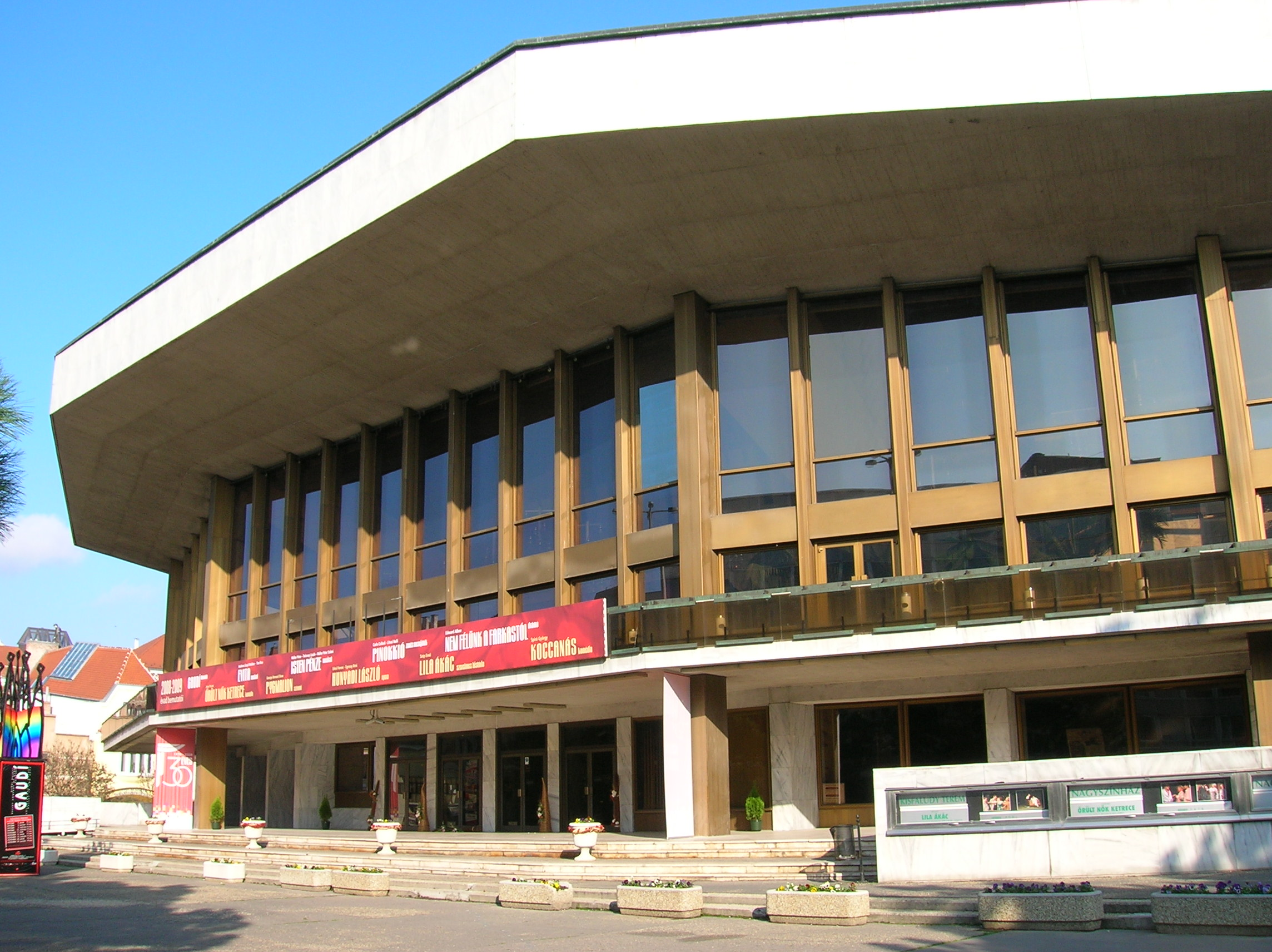
- Interactive map of Győri Nemzeti Színház
- Former names: Kisfaludy Károly Theatre
- Address: Czuczor Gergely street 7.
- Location: Győr, Győr-Moson-Sopron county, Hungary
- Coordinates: 47°41′12″N 17°38′10″E
- Capacity: 678
- Type: Theatre

Construction
- Built: 1973-1978
- Opened: 1978
- Renovated: 2009

Website
- Győri Nemzeti Színház

The National Theatre of Győr is a theatre in Győr, Hungary. Opened on 2 November 1978, it is the main theatre of the Győr-Moson-Sopron region. Until January 1, 1992, it bore the name Kisfaludy Károly Theatre. In 2008 the number of visitors was 128,283, thus the theatre ranks as the 6th most visited in the country.

== Theatre in Győr ==
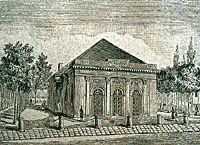
The first stone theatre of Győr

In Győr, just like the rest of western Hungary, the population was mostly German-speaking in the turn of the 18-19th century. Therefore, the language of the earliest such enterprises was German, resulting in the importing of a theatrical tradition from Vienna. The first plays in the city were religious, conducted regularly in the Jesuit school from the middle of the 18th century, most often in Latin. German plays were played from the late 18th century. After the dissolution of the Jesuit school, the school's refectory was transformed to a theater. From 1768, Felix Berner organized plays in a permanent wooden structure in the summer periods. Győr's first stone theater was built in 1798 by József Reinpacher in Győrsziget, although the entrance hall was still made from wood. This building, expanded in 1830 to a capacity of 600 seats, provided home for German and Hungarian theatre in the city for over 130 years, and was demolished in 1927. The city regained its playhouse in 1937 by transforming a former diary factory into a community centre, including a theatre and a concert hall. The building was named Kisfaludy Károly Theatre in 1949.

== The current building ==
In 1964, the MSZMP's Political Committee of Győr-Sopron county decided to build a theatre with around 600-700 seats. After deciding upon the location, the preparations began in 1967. Construction began in 1973 and was finished in 1978. As the new home of the Kisfaludy Károly Theatre, the building features distinct Greek marble slabs, and two 55 x 10 meter large ceramic work of Victor Vasarely, and had its premier on the 2 November. From 1 January 1992 the institution took the name National Theatre of Győr. Major inner reconstructions took place in 2009, renovating the auditorium, passages, and machinery.

== Sources ==
- Dezső, Bunovácz. Győr-Moson-Sopron megye kézikönyve. Budapest : CEBA, 2004. ISBN 978-963-9089-94-5
- Theatre of Győr in the Hungarian Theatrical Lexicon (György, Székely. Magyar Színházmuvészeti Lexikon. Budapest: Akadémiai Kiadó, 1994. ISBN 978-963-05-6635-3), freely available on mek.oszk.hu
