= Montenegrin National Theatre =

Coordinates: 42.441733°N 19.260658°E

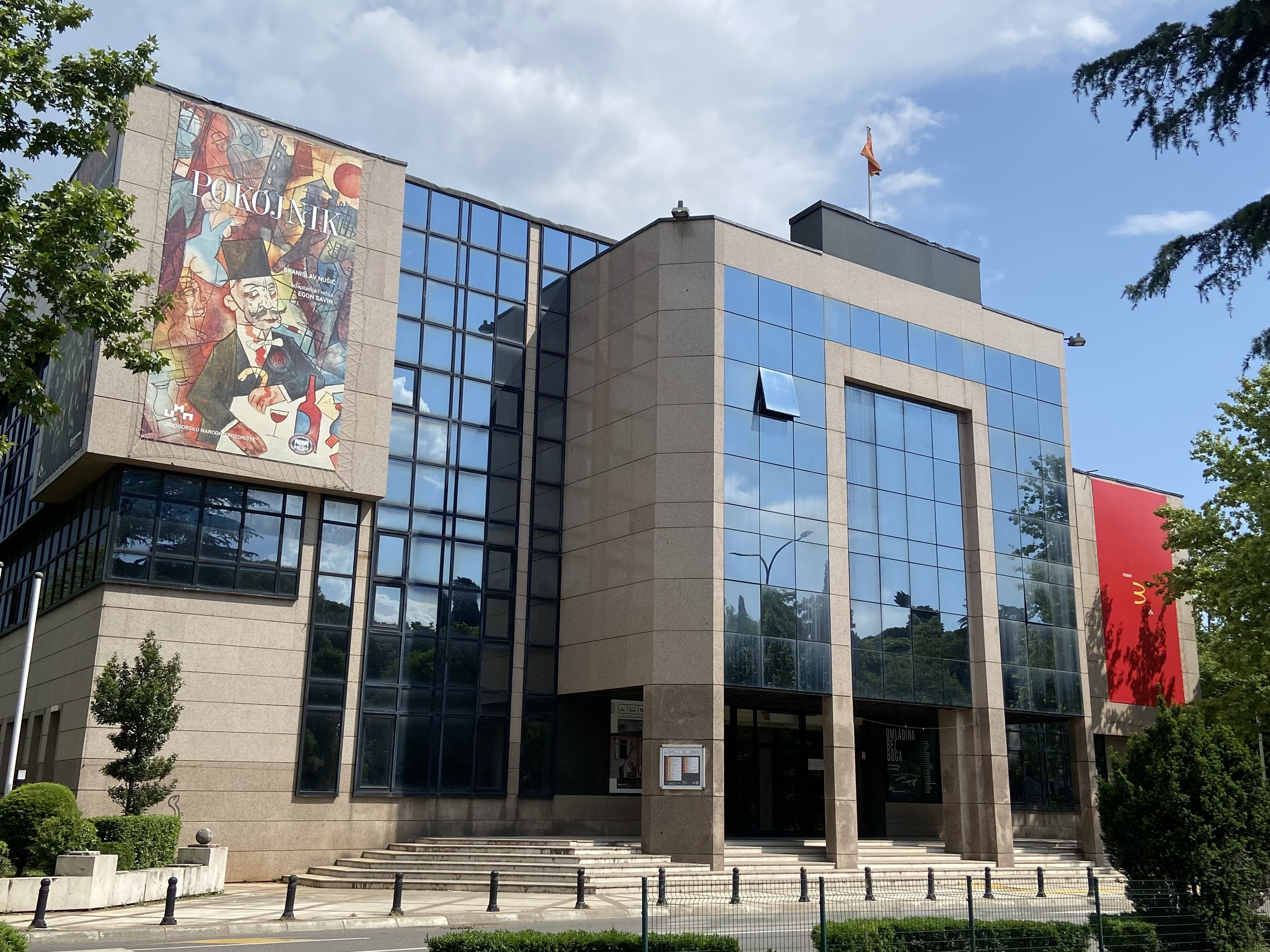
- Montenegrin National Theatre
- Interactive map of Montenegrin National Theatre
- Address: Stanka Dragojevića 18; Podgorica, Podgorica Capital City; Montenegro
- Type: national theatre

Website
- cnp.me

The Montenegrin National Theatre (Montenegrin: Crnogorsko narodno pozorište / Црногорско народно позориште) is located in Montenegrin capital of Podgorica. It was founded in 1953, in the beginning as a city theatre, under the name Titograd National Theatre.

The initial idea was to constitute a strong theatre that would meet all requirements and assumptions of a national theatre, and it was only in 1969 that it was given the name of the National theatre, although it had been working until then with all the attributes of the national theatre. The Montenegrin National Theatre assembled at the very beginning all prominent actors from the Montenegrin theater area. Thus constituted theater, the only professional one obliged to cherish national drama opus, was posed with extremely serious assignments to put on stage quality shows, to be involved in tours and to cover the whole of Montenegro.

In 1989, the building of the Montenegrin National Theatre burnt down to its foundations. It was entirely rebuilt in May 1997. The first theater night lit up with Njegoš's The Mountain Wreath, directed by Branislav Mićunović.
