= National Theatre Mostar =

Theatre company in Mostar, Bosnia and Herzegovina

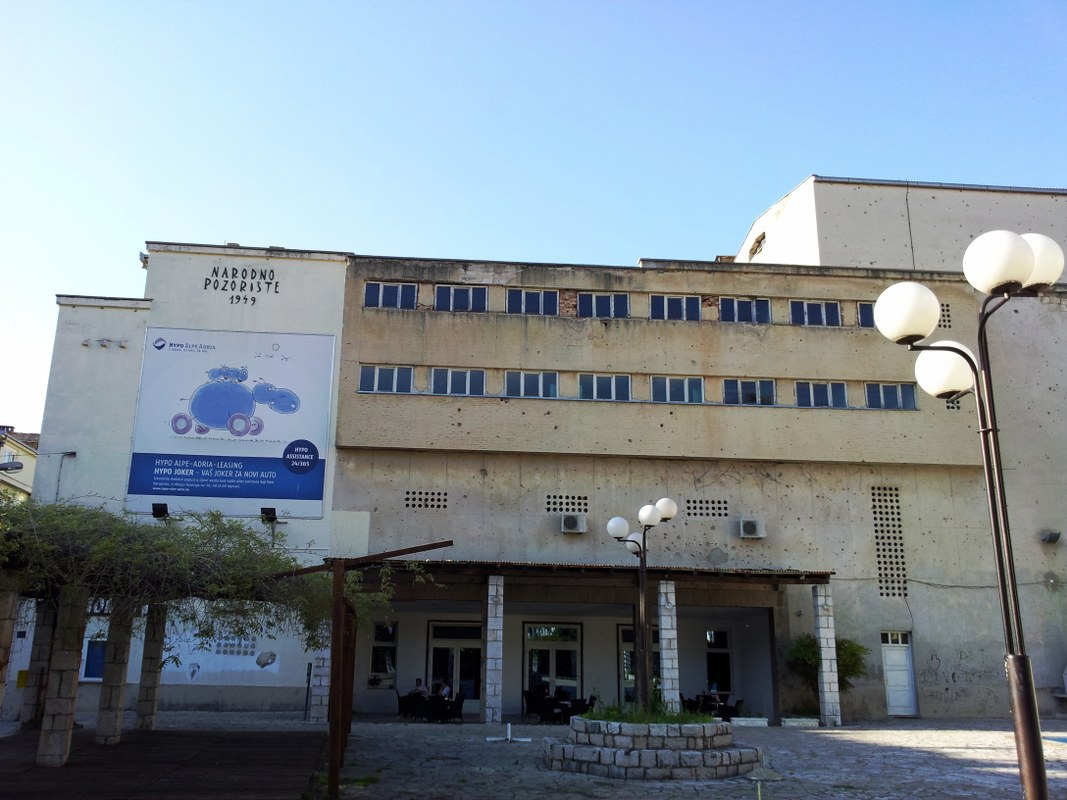
- National Theatre Mostar Facade
- Interactive map of National Theatre Mostar
- Address: Mostar; Bosnia and Herzegovina
- Coordinates: 43°20′24.5″N 17°48′55″E

Construction
- Opened: 17 November 1951

Website
- www.npm.ba

The National Theatre Mostar (Bosnian: Narodno pozorište Mostar) is the largest public theatre in Mostar, Bosnia and Herzegovina, where performances are held, as well as other arts events. It was officially founded on 28 November 1949 and the opening play was Matej Bora's Night at the Globoko (Odrpanci), directed by Safet Pašalić.

It opened on 17 November 1951 as the first newly built theater building in Bosnia and Herzegovina after World War II, with a premiere of Hasanaginica directed by Sveto Milutinović.

== Bosnian War ==
Up until the start of the war in Bosnia and Herzegovina in 1992, the National Theatre Mostar produced 291 shows. The last show, prior to the start of the war was Meša Selimović's Death and the Dervish directed by Ahmet Obradović.

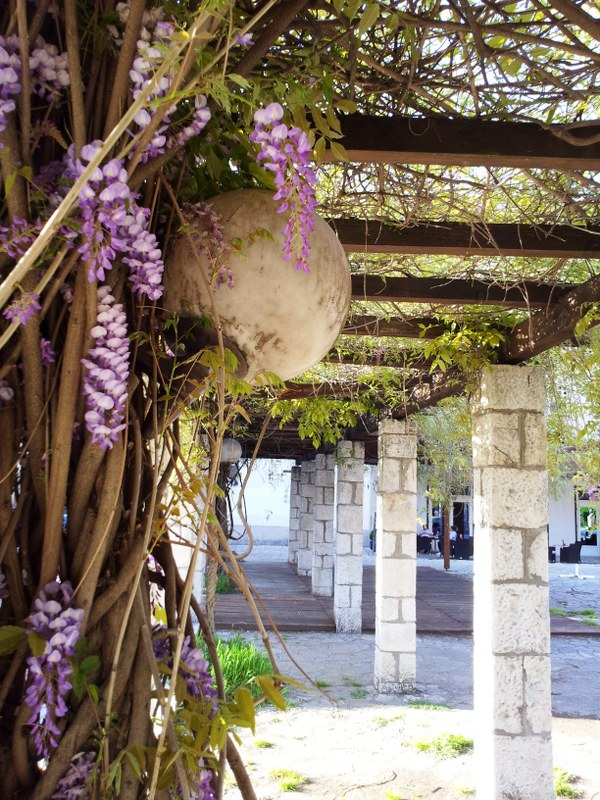
National Theatre Mostar Facade front courtyard

The theatre had performances on a small stage during the war while the big stage was "reserved" for refugees. The building was eventually destroyed as a result of the war. The set area was completely burnt and the costume shop was severely damaged as well.

== Annual festival ==
The National Theatre Mostar hosts an annual comedy festival called Mostarska Liska. The first festival was held in 1991 at the initiative of Ahmet Obradović, a former theatre director. The festival was then reestablished in 2004 at the initiative Šerif Aljić, former actor and theatre director. Mostarska Liska takes place between April and May each year. “Liska” is, in fact, a typical slapstick comedy character of the local tradition. At the end of the show, a jury awards two prizes: the “Great Liska” (locally called “Velika liska”) for the best theatrical performance, and the “Little Liska” (locally called “Mala Liska”) for the best actor.

The current theatre is still undergoing intensive and continuous efforts to rebuild its technical and human resources to strengthen the current theater.
