= São João National Theatre =

Theatre in Porto, Portugal

São João Theatre
- Teatro São João
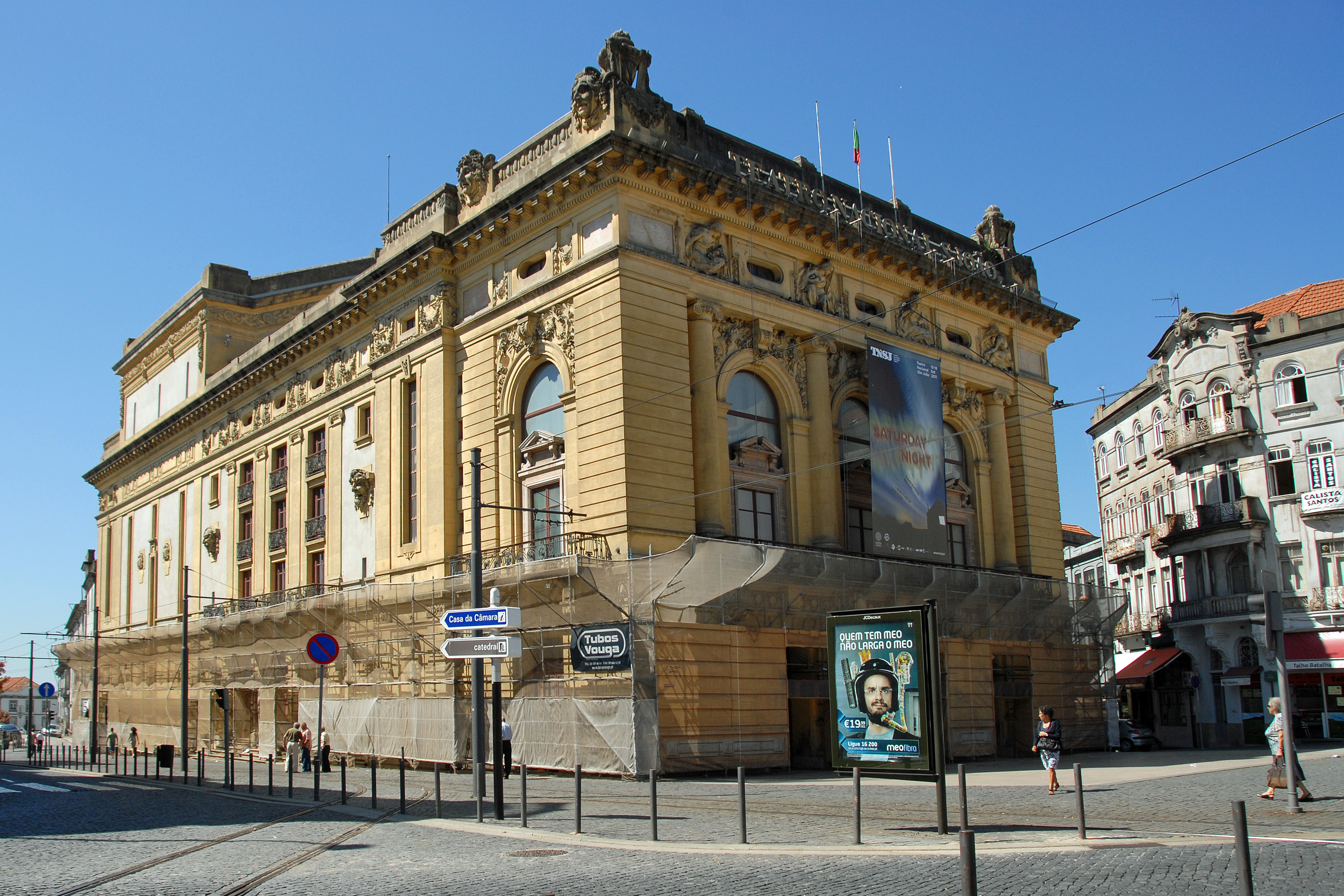
- The common oblique view of the national theatre at the corner of Praça da Batalha and Rua de Augusto Rosa

General information
- Type: Theater
- Architectural style: Neoclassical
- Location: Cedofeita, Santo Ildefonso, Sé, Miragaia, São Nicolau e Vitória, Porto, Portugal
- Coordinates: 41°8′41″N 8°36′26.5″W
- Owner: Câmara Municipal do Porto

Technical details
- Material: Wood

Design and construction
- Architect: José Marques da Silva

The São João Theatre (Portuguese: Teatro São João), commonly referred to as the São João National Theatre is a Portuguese theatre and concert venue in the civil parish of Cedofeita, Santo Ildefonso, Sé, Miragaia, São Nicolau e Vitória, in the municipality of Porto, in northern Portugal.

== History ==
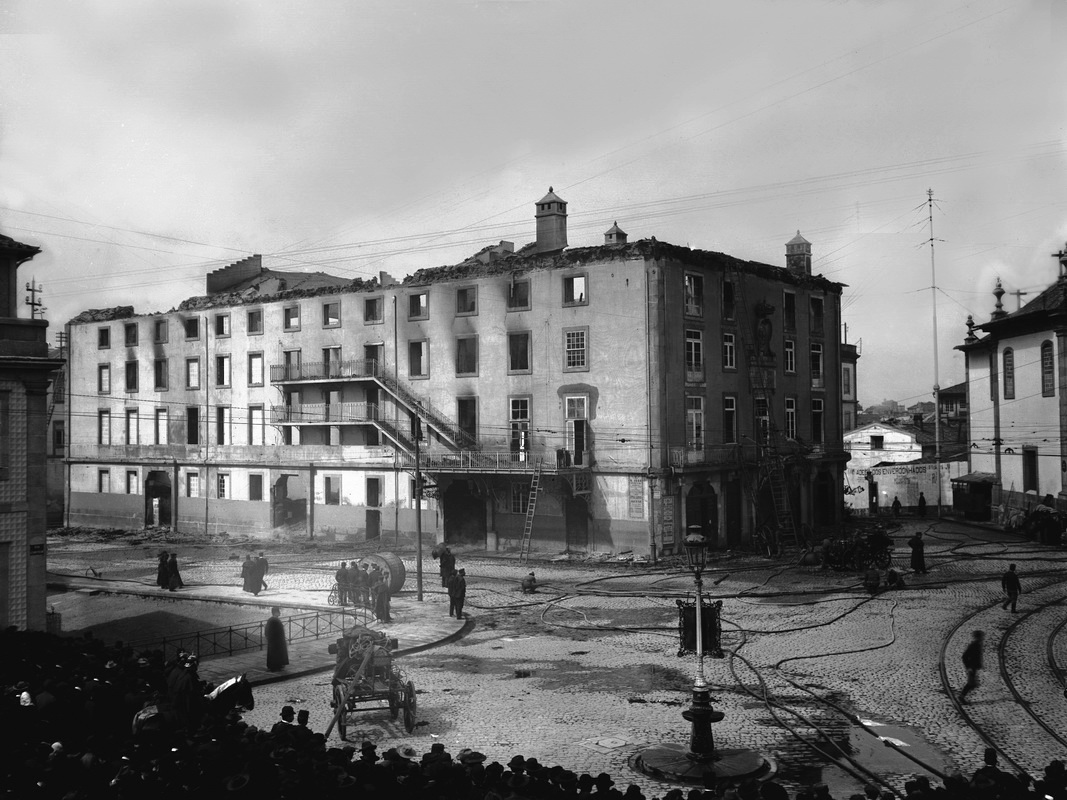
The remnants of the simple facades of the theatre as they appeared following the fire that gutted the entire building

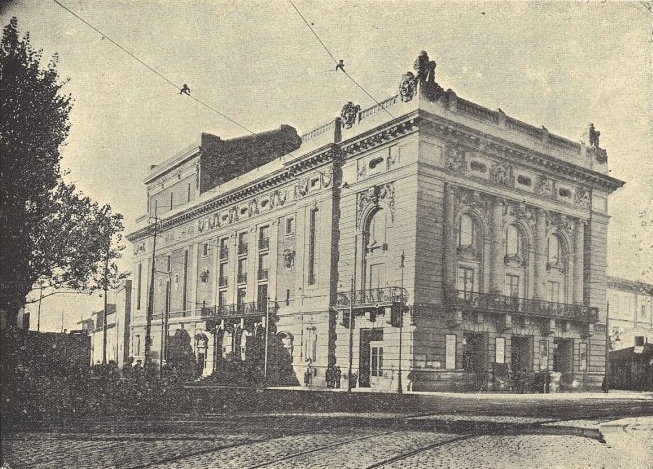
The Teatro São João as it appeared in 1934

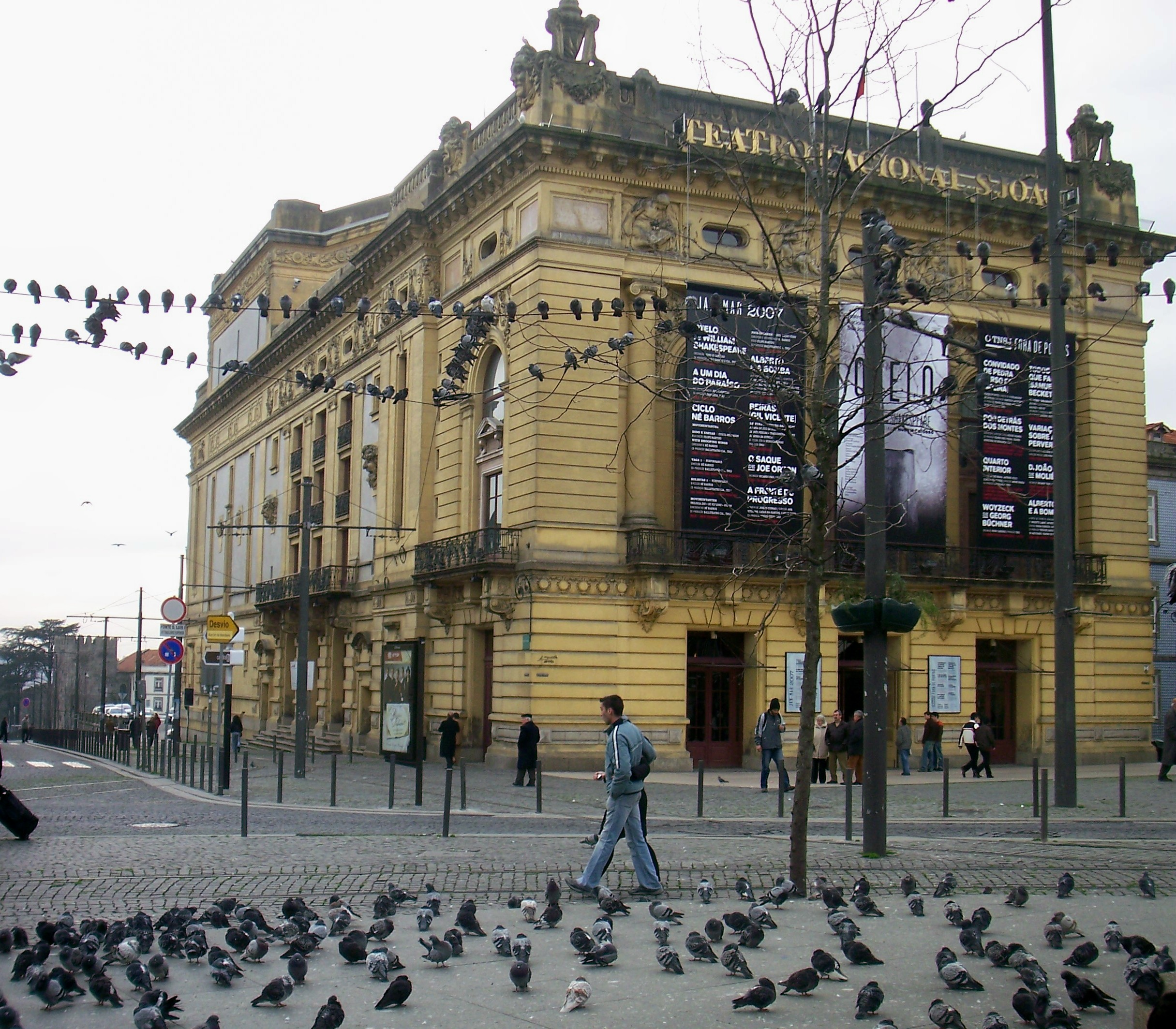
The typical view of the theatre in the 20th century

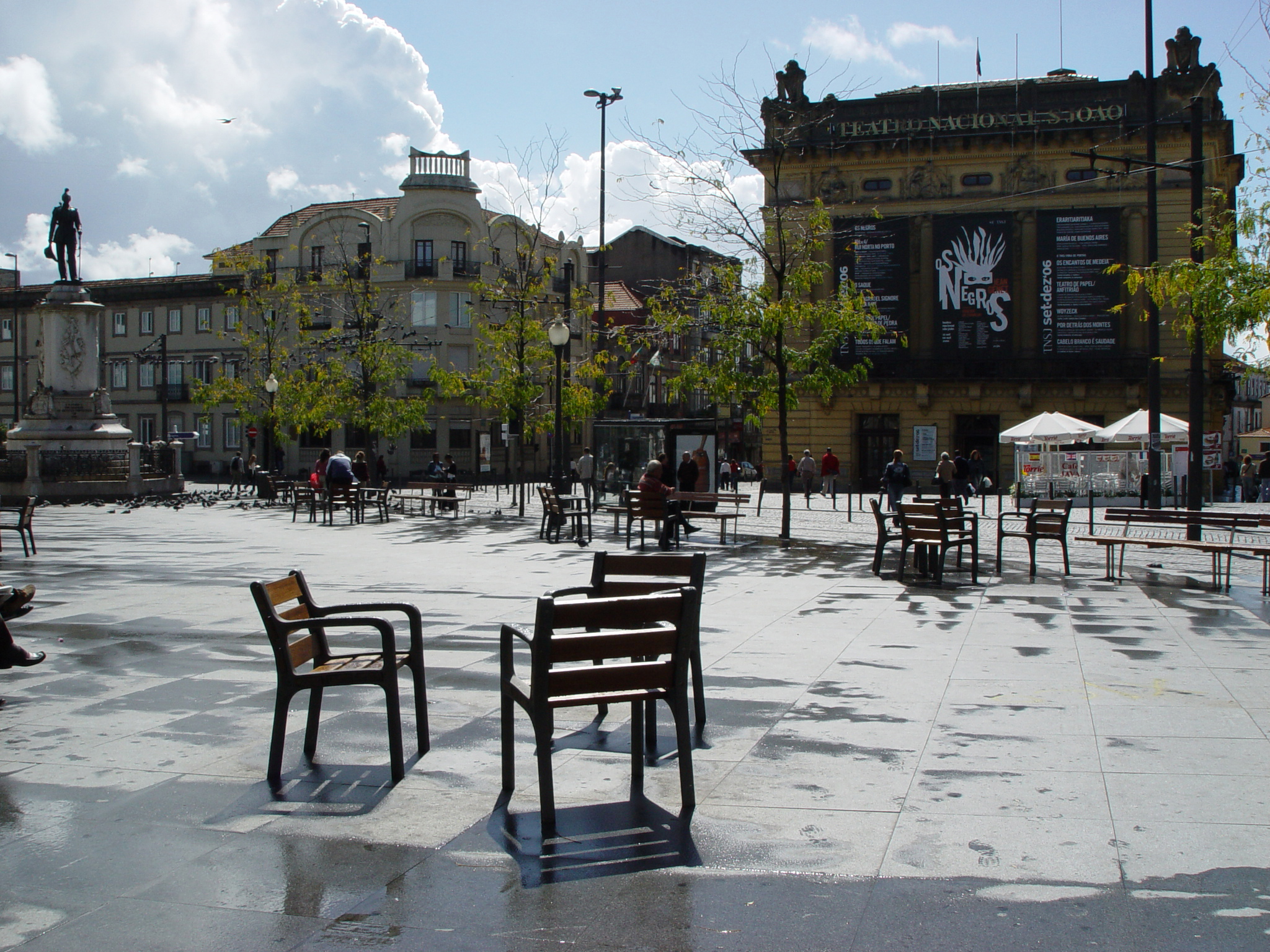
An idyllic view of the theatre and square

The primitive theatre was constructed at the end of the 18th century (1796) by Italian Vicente Mazzoneschi, and inaugurated on 13 May 1798, as the Teatro do Príncipe (Prince's Theatre). It was named in honour of the prince-regent John VI, who later became King. The construction firm of Francisco de Almada Mendonça was charged with the project, and produced a four-story building with its principal facade decorated with the royal coat-of-arms under an inscription.

A fire destroyed the theatre interior on 11 April 1908, and a new structure was built on its former site. Before its destruction, the theatre had a markedly horseshoe-shaped plan. Its rounded ceiling was painted by Joaquim Rafael and had in 1856 received a new painting by Paulo Pizzi. The building included four rows of booths, with the booth for the royal family located centrally on the second floor. The large atrium, and the corridors large supported by access from large staircases. Along the second floor was a magnificent concert hall. Generally, the theatre had excellent acoustics. The stage wall was painted by Sequeira, but was later replaced in 1825 by paintings contracted to the Spaniard João Rodrigues, and later, Palucci. Until 1838, the theatre was lit by tallow candles, and later by similar candles lit by oil.

On 11 April 1908, the Civil Governor nominated a commission to promote the construction of a new theatre.

A competition opened on October 8, presided by engineer Basílio Alberto de Sousa Pinto, Xavier Esteves, Casimiro Jerónimo de Faria, architect José Marques da Silva and the director of public works, Isidro de Campos, whom immediately denounced the conditions of the tender. A new competition was announced a week later, based on slight alterations to the original provisions. Preliminary project proposals were accepted on 22 February 1910. It was Marques da Silva who obtained the first prize and João de Moura Coutinho de Almeida d'Eça, the runner-up. Before the competition was held, the winning project was designated to Moura Coutinho, then director of the Direcção das Obras Públicas (Directorate of Public Works) in Braga. The winning project was approved on 6 May, during a municipal session, with the work awarded to the company Soconstroi.

Work began in 1911 under the direction of Porto architect José Marques da Silva. The inner, horseshoe-shaped concert hall included a ceiling painted by the artists José de Brito and Acácio Lino, while the entrance hall was decorated with sculptural work by Henrique Araújo Moreira, Diogo de Macedo and José Fernandes de Sousa Caldas. On the main facade, of sober design, are four reliefs representing four feelings: Kindness, Pain, Hatred and Love, created by Diogo de Macedo and Sousa Caldas. The building was complete in 1918. Its inauguration was held on 7 March 1920, with the presentation of Giuseppe Verdi's Aida.

A projection area was constructed in 1932, and the theatre began to operate a cinema, then designated São João Cine.

On 26 February 1982, the building was designated a Imóvel de Interesse Público (Property of Public Interest), under Decree 28/82 (Diário da República, Série 1, 47).

In 1992, the theatre was acquired by the State from the family of Pinto da Costa. At that time, the work on the installation of security features and public services were undertaken on site. These were expanded the following year with upgrades to dressing rooms, the stage, washrooms and remodelling of the electrical systems, which included the installation of an electrical generator.

Two years later (23 November) a proposal was issued by the DRPorto, to reclassify the Theatre as a Portuguese National Monument. Following a period of remodelling, the theatre began to function regularly, under the designation the Teatro Nacional de São João (São João National Theatre). In addition to general cleaning, the work included the consolidation and restoration of the exterior facades, recuperation of the decorative sculptures, treatment of surfaces in pigmented mortar and the installation of new woods and iron.

During the course of this transition, attempts to reclassify the institution continued; on 22 April 1996, a dispatch by the Vice-President of IPPAR, devolved to the DRPorto its proposal for reformulation. On 12 September 2005, a new proposal was issued by that entity. This new proposal was favourably accepted by the deliberative council of IGESPAR (the successor to IPPAR), which also proposed that no special protection area should be needed, owing to the sites inclusion with the broader Historical Zone of Porto (an area already designated). The process was ratified by the Secretário de Estado da Cultura (Secretary of State for Culture) on 14 October 2010.

== Architecture ==
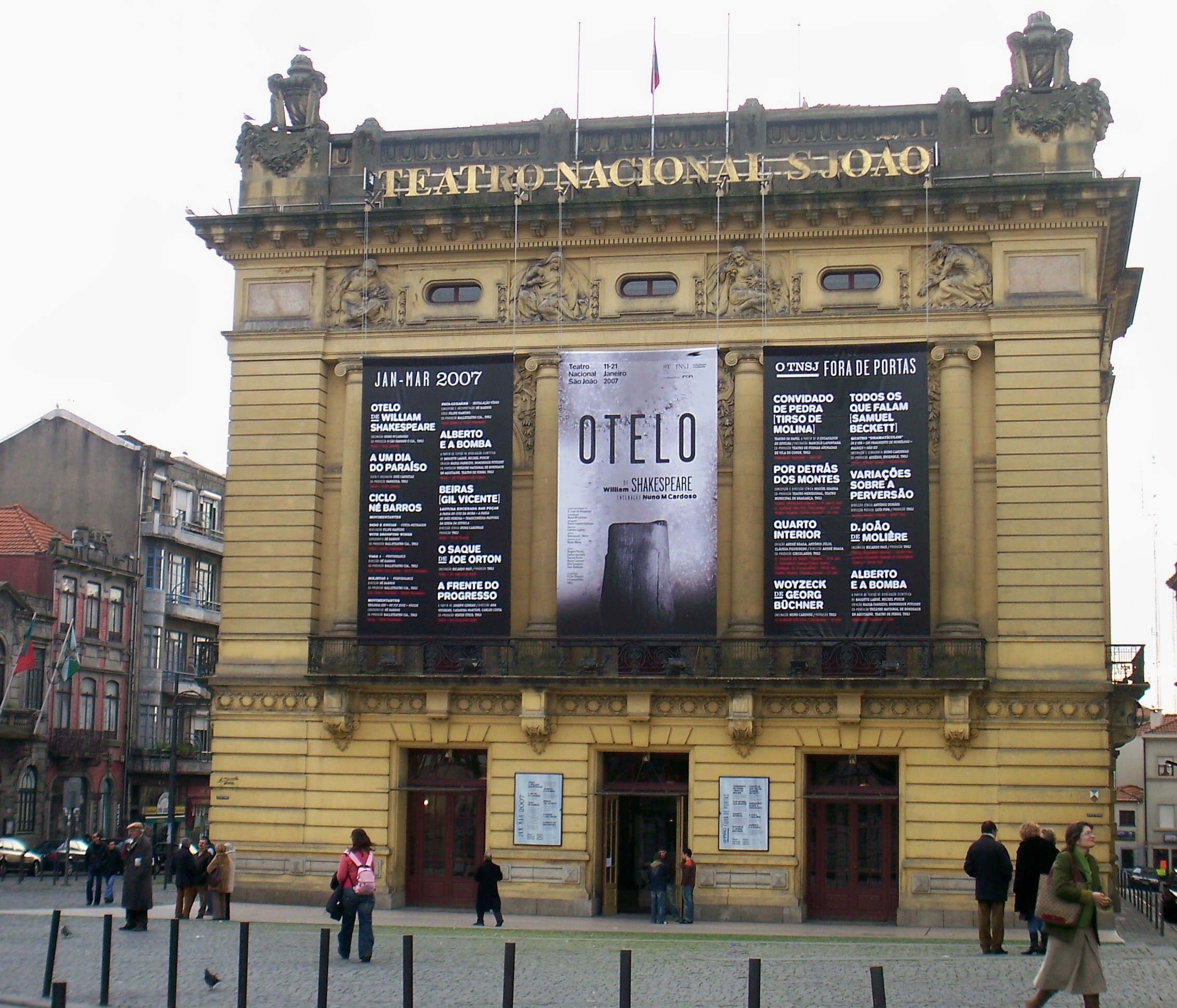
The main entranceway along the narrower facades, with three porticos, doorways and Neoclassical pilasters

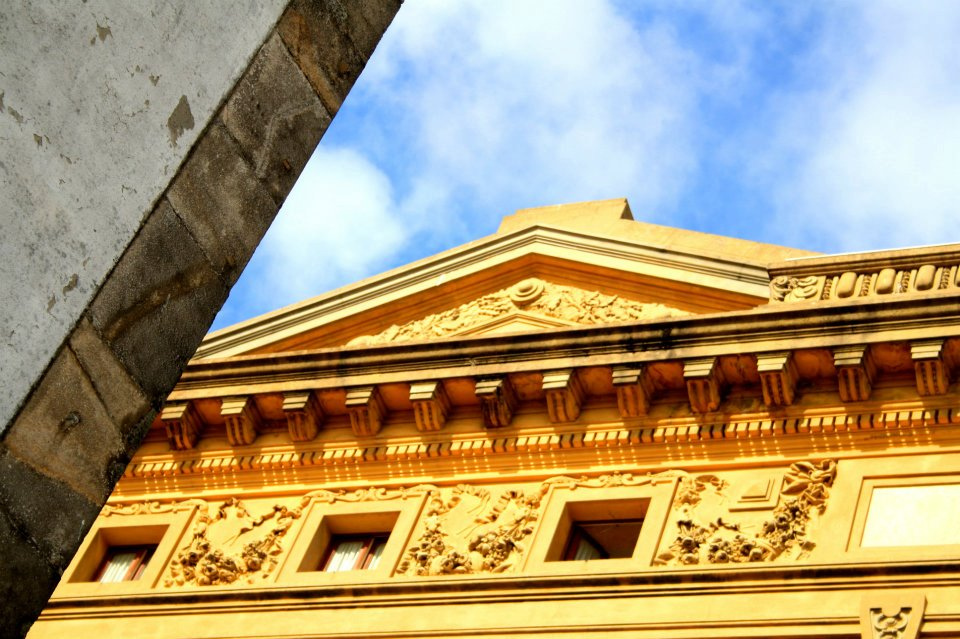
The pediment of the lateral facades

The theatre is centrally located in Porto, occupying a complete block, in front of the Praça da Batalha, between the Rua de Augusto Rosa (on its left) and the Travessa do Cativ (on its right), with the Rua do Cativo to the rear.

The rectangular plan is covered in tile roofing, with its principal facade found on one of the two smaller sides, framed laterally by rustic cornerstones and accentuated by capricious urns and garlands. The "noble floor" with three arches on steeped pilasters is inscribed under columns with broad shafts and Ionian capitals, while the doors of the lodges are topped by interrupted pediments.

Three loggias exist on extended balconies, over sills in the thickness of the walls and interconnected by a balcony running on 4 strong consoles in the same alignment as the ordering columns. The arches have a shutter in support and transition to the entablature, which opens a frieze corresponding to a mezzanine of three openings and bas-reliefs alluding to the human passions ("Pain", "Hate", "Kindness" and "Love"), subtitled on the architrave. Above, the denticulated cord ends at the frieze and the beginning of a strong cornice based on rebound corbels, which are dense, in a repetitive rhythm that runs throughout the building. Crowning the facade is the gable, rising over a high platform, with rhythmic fenestration and formal, ornamented balustrades. The lateral facades are symmetrical. On the ground floor, there are 3 arched doorways (topped by a running balcony and supported by 4 consoles), flanked by 2 small doors, with an interrupted curvilinear pediment. Here, 3 doors (that are repeated in the two successive upper floors) with balconies and sills, are interspersed between four, embedded Ionic pilasters. The set is flanked by strong masks, on intermediate floor, on which a window opens at the top, with small gap at the bottom. Corresponding to the stage area, there are high, open slits; in this area, the body of the theatre rises above the entablature, accompanying the broken forms or gables, underlined by the frame and ornamental strip.

=== Interior ===
On the ground floor, the vestibule occupies the whole width of the building, with access through the 3 doors of the main facade and lateral entranceways. From this space you can access the corridors leading to the audience seating or, to the side, the stairs to the upper floors. The avant-foyer and foyer are located on the first floor and occupy the entire width of the building, with two rooms for a restaurant and smoking room. With its double height, corresponding to the main hall and facade, the interior is profusely decorated along the windows and balustrades, with a wide oculus on the transition doors to the "avant-foyer". The two floors correspond to the first-order royal boxes, and, on the second floor, the second-order boxes. The "avant-foyer" and "foyer" allow circulation with its balconies. On the last floors are the galleries and the amphitheater, forming a single group of places, but with different accesses (one at the level of the lower floors and another at the level of the highest). On the first floor of the amphitheater is a storage room and a paint shop. From the ground floor, the stairs lead to the galleries and amphitheatres, by two direct, exterior entrances, along the lateral facades. The layout of the horseshoe-shaped hall holds 1328 seats, including the 6 large boxes, with one at the height of the first floor, intended as an alternative to a royal box. Between the audience and the stage is the orchestra pit, with independent entrances from the side facades. The stage and dressing rooms have side and rear entrances, that can be divided by a metallic cloth.
