= Teatro Nacional de El Salvador =

Coordinates: 13°41′55″N 89°11′25″W

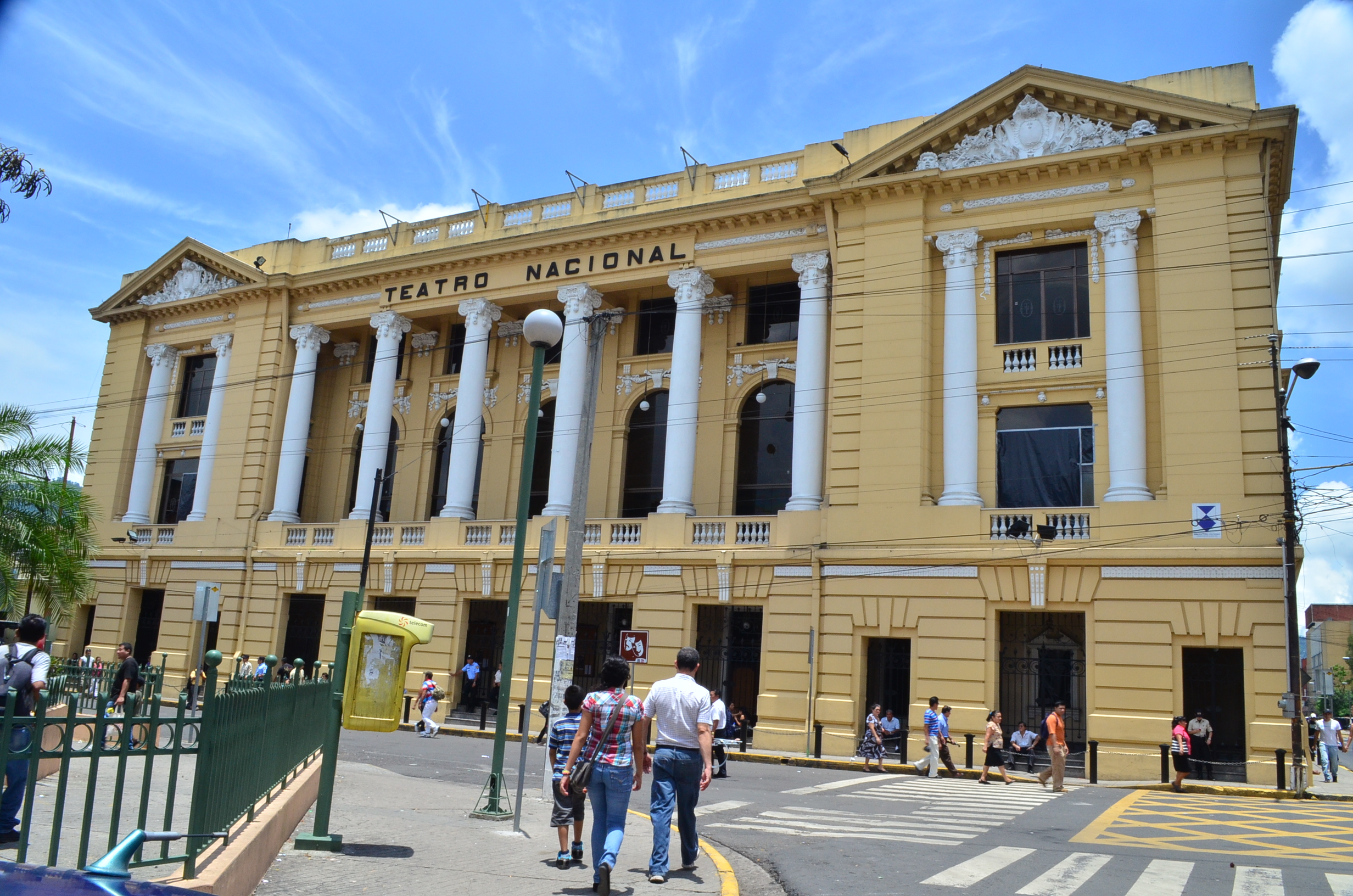
Teatro Nacional

Teatro Nacional de El Salvador, or National Theatre of El Salvador began construction on November 3, 1911, by the French architect Daniel Beylard; and inaugurated March 1, 1917. It is of French Renaissance style with modern touches. It was decorated by the Italian architect Lucio Cappellaro, and its Great Hall is one of the most beautiful and elegant in Central America.

== History ==
El Salvador's National Theater was opened in 1903.

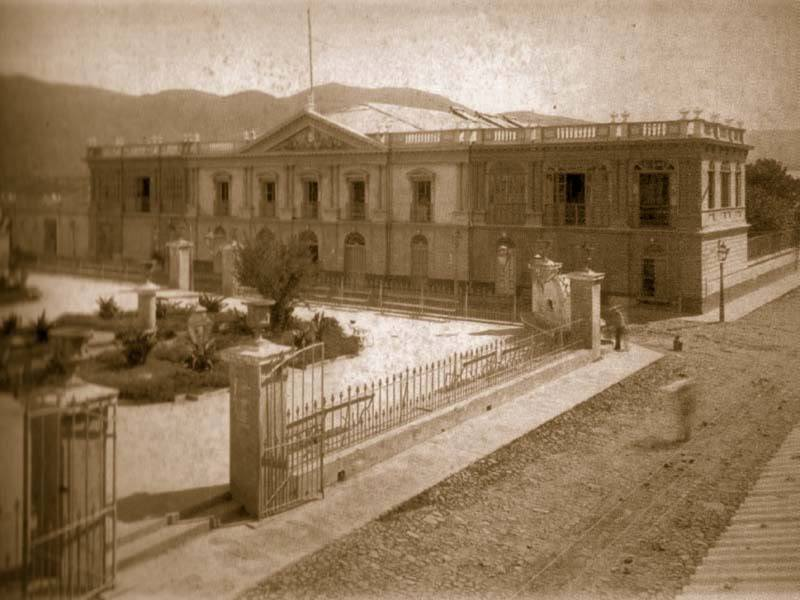
The National Theater shortly after its opening.

A competition was held to choose a design for the theatre. The prizes for the first two places were 8,000 and 4,000 Francs each. The entries were reviewed by a commission composed of the engineers José E. Alcaine, Luis Fleury, and Aurelio Fuentes. The 12 plans submitted were from the following countries: 5 from France, 2 from the United States, 1 from the Principality of Monaco, 1 from Italy, and 3 from El Salvador. The winning project was "Melpemone" by the French Architect Daniel Beylard. The construction contract was awarded to the Salvadoran firm Ferracutti y Cía. José María Peralta Lagos was the head engineer during construction.

After 59 years of constant activity, in 1976, a process of remodeling was begun under the direction of the Salvadoran architect, Ricardo Jiménez Castillo. Funds were provided by the Salvadoran government. Castillo hired a select group of contributors: Roberto Salomón, to establish the requirements of the contemporary stage; Simón Magaña, for the decoration; Carlos Cañas, for the elaboration of murals; and Margarita Álvarez de Martínez, for the masterful copper artwork that would adorn the doors to the theatre boxes. Afterwards artisans of Ilobasco joined the team and students of the then Bachillerato en Artes led by the master artisan Carlos Cañas.

Multiple architectural styles were enriched in the fusion of the construction of the National Theatre including: Versailles Style, Rococo, Romanticism, and Art Nouveau, with regional touches. Some of the furniture was elaborated in the shop of the theatre, the rest of the furniture, rugs, carpets, armchairs, and lecterns, were imported from the United States. The drop curtains of the stage and the lights of the boxes and halls, were brought from Austria.

In 1977, the master artisan Carlos Cañas painted the cupola of the great hall with the fresco entitled "El mestizaje cultural", "The Cultural Convergence", that occupies an area of 230 m^{2} (2,500 sq ft) approximately. Thanks to this work, the ambiance reminds you of the great hall of Palais Garnier, decorated with Chagall artwork. The reinauguration of the National Theatre took place November 5, 1978 with the presentation of the National Award of Culture, which was given to the great Antonio Salazar, and Dr. Julio Fausto Hernández. The following year, on February 16, 1979, it was declared a National Monument by the Legislative Assembly. Since then, it has maintained in constant activity with theatre, music, dance, recitals, conferences, and acts of great importance in the political and cultural life of El Salvador. In 1992, the government of Japan presented a modern sound and light system to the theatre.
