= Cláudio Santoro National Theater =

- Teatro Nacional Cláudio Santoro
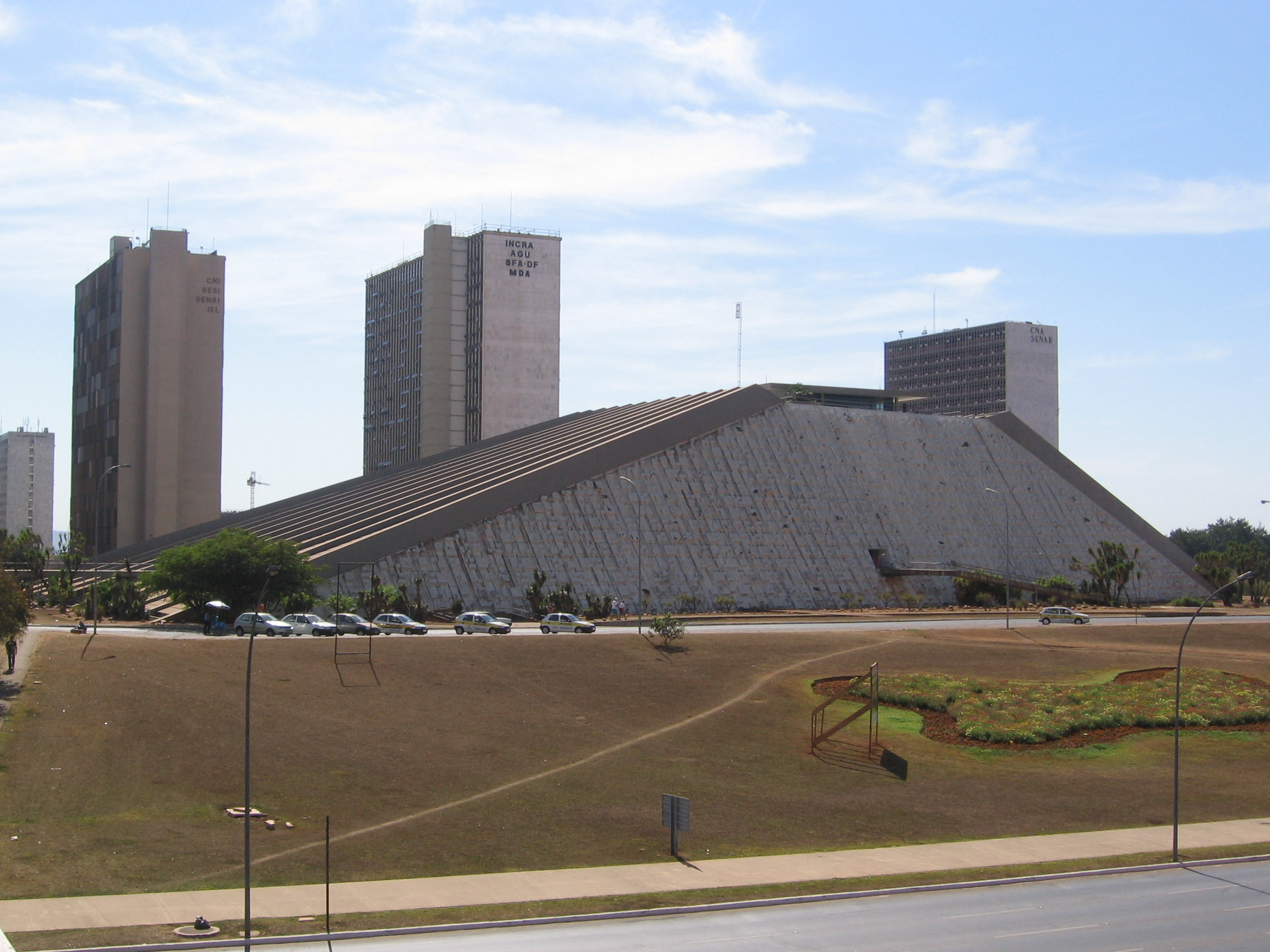
- Cláudio Santoro National Theater
- Interactive map of the Cláudio Santoro National Theater area

General information
- Type: Theater
- Architectural style: Modern
- Location: Brasília, Brazil
- Coordinates: 15.7922°S 47.8802°W
- Construction started: July 30, 1960
- Completed: 1966
- Renovated: 1976–1981
- Owner: The Federal District of Brazil

Design and construction
- Architect: Oscar Niemeyer

The Cláudio Santoro National Theater (Portuguese: Teatro Nacional Cláudio Santoro) is a multi-theater building in Brasília, Brazil. It was designed by Oscar Niemeyer in the Modern architectural style. Construction began on July 30, 1960, and the building was completed in 1966. Built in the shape of a truncated pyramid, it is the largest building in Brasilia designed by Niemeyer specifically for the arts. The building was closed for renovation in 1976, and was reopened on April 21, 1981.

The National Theater is operated by Secretary of Culture of the Federal District and is home to three venues; the 60-seat Alberto Nepomuceno theater, the 407-seat Martins Pena theater, and the 1,407 seat Villa-Lobos theater. The complex also includes an exhibition gallery that is accessible to the public.

The Theater began a process of renovation in 2014 and remained close to the public until 2024.

== History ==
Construction of the theater was started on July 30, 1960. The building was structurally complete by January 30, 1961, but construction was then interrupted until early 1966. The Martins-Pena theater was opened on April 21, 1966, and was used for ten years until it was closed on September 4, 1976 during completion of the complex.

Construction was completed by March 1979, and the Villa-Lobos theatre was opened with a concert conducted by Cláudio Santoro. The Martins-Pena theater was reopened on March 7, and the Alberto Nepomuceno theatre was opened on March 8. On December 1, 1979, the entire complex was closed again to complete renovations, and construction began on an annex which would include offices, rehearsal rooms, and galleries.

The complex was reopened on April 21, 1981, and an annex was opened on June 24, 1981. The theatre was renamed Claudio Santoro National Theater on September 1, 1989, in honor of the Brazilian composer and violinist.

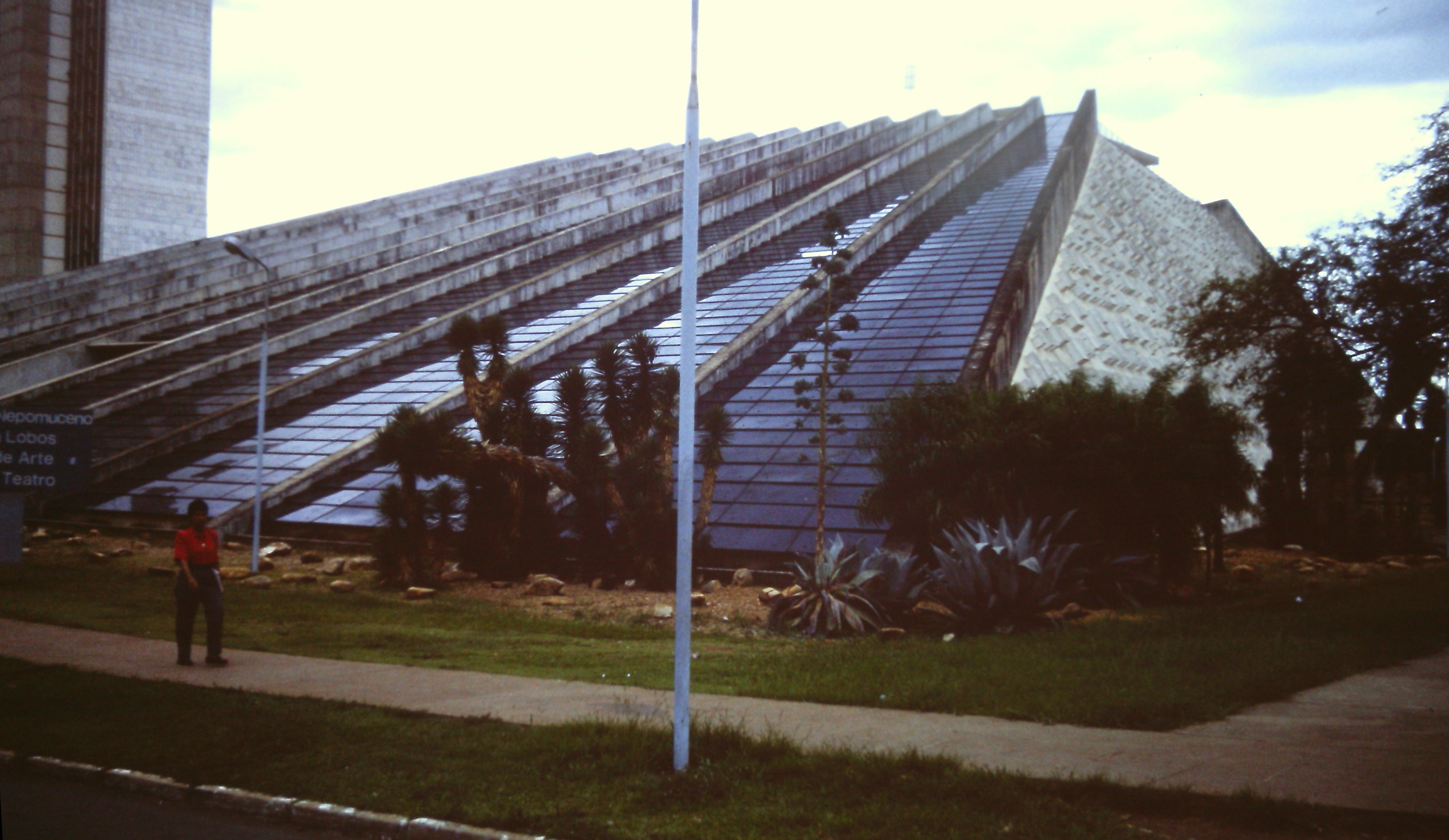
Elevation of Theatre (1994)

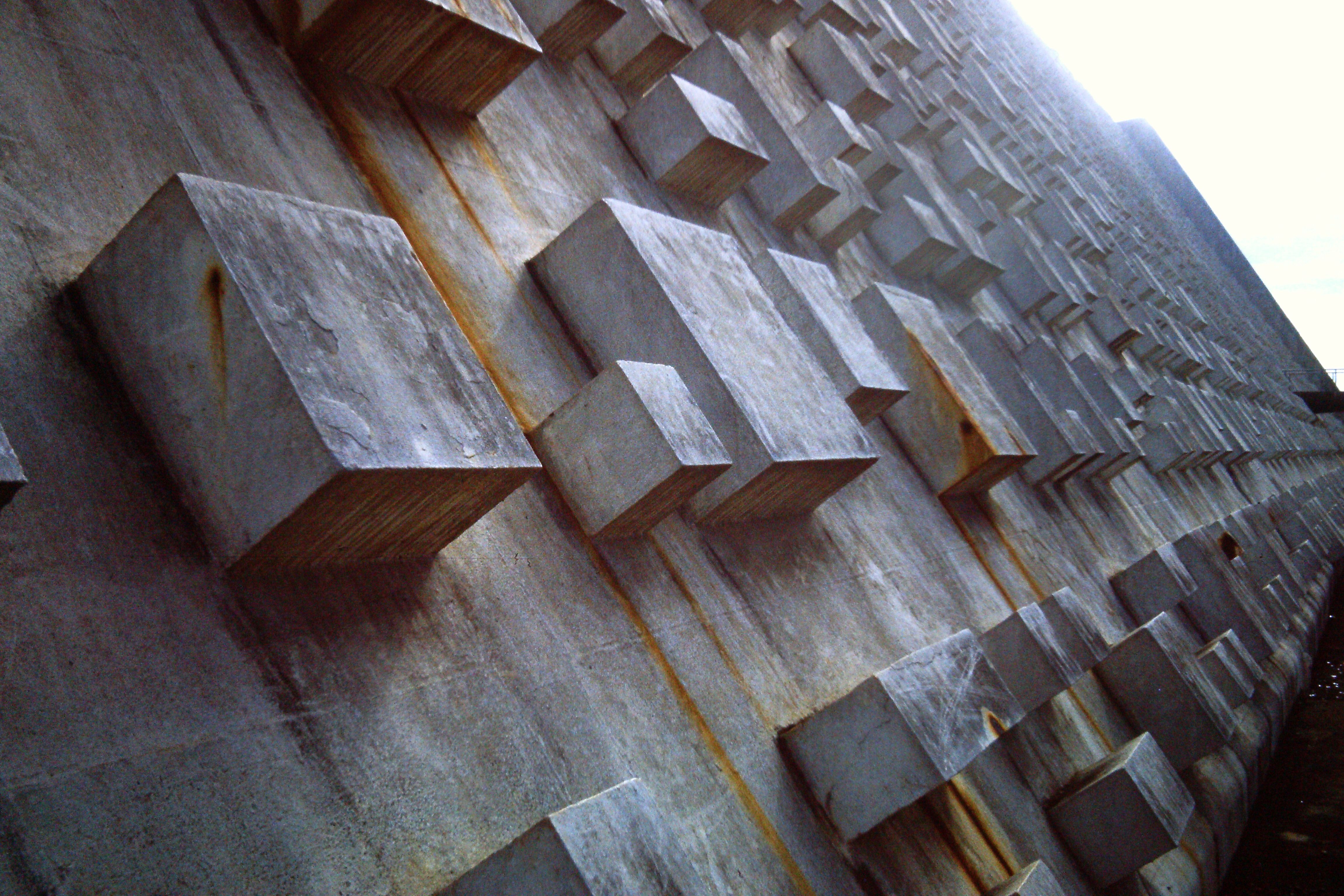
Side facade with concrete cube details and corrosion (1994)

== Renovation, closure to the public and reopening ==
In January 2014, the National Theater began a long renovation process after many irregularities detected by the Public Ministry. It spent a decade close to the public due to budgetary constraints. Although not every room has been entirely reformed, the Theater reopened in December 2024.
