= Gypsy Girl =

Gypsy Girl or The Gypsy Girl may refer to:

== Art ==
- The Gypsy Girl (Hals), also known as Gypsy Girl, a painting by Frans Hals
- Gypsy Girl (mosaic), a mosaic uncovered in the ancient city of Zeugma
- Gypsy Girl, alternate English-language title of Nicolas Cordier's statue La Zingarella (Cordier) (c. 1607–1612)
- Gypsy Girl, alternate English-language title of Antonio da Correggio's painting La Zingarella (Correggio) (1516-1517)

== Drama, television, and film ==
- Gypsy Girl, the US title of the 1966 film Sky West and Crooked
- Gypsy Girl (TV series), British TV series
- The Gypsy Girl (film), 1953 film
- The Gypsy Girl (play), 1905 play by Hal Reid
- The Gypsy Girl, alternate English-language title of Donizetti's opera La zingara
- The Gypsy Girl, alternate English-language title of La gitanilla (1924 film)
- The Gypsy Girl at the Alcove, 1923 film

== Literature ==
- Gypsy Girl, alternate title of The Diddakoi
- The Gypsy Girl, alternate English-language title of Miguel de Cervantes's 1613 novel La gitanilla
- The Gypsy Girl, an 1836 novel by Hannah Maria Jones
- The Gypsy Girl, a novel by Val Wood

== Music ==
- "Gypsy Girl", a song by Lior from the 2004 album Autumn Flow
- "Gypsy Girl", a song by Everyday Sunday, from the album Anthems for the Imperfect (2004)
- "Gypsy Girl", a song by Wet Wet Wet, from the album Picture This (1995)
- "Gypsy Girl", original title of the ABBA song "Money, Money, Money"
- "Gypsy Girl", a 1983 song by Cruella de Ville

== See also ==
- La Gitanilla (disambiguation)
