= La Zingarella =

La Zingarella may refer to:

- La Zingarella (Cordier), early 17th century statue of Diana by Nicolas Cordier
- La Zingarella (Correggio), 1516–17 painting by Antonio da Correggio
