= Alexandru Carnabel =

Romanian doctor

- Born: June 7, 1868; Gemeni, Mehedinți, Oltenia, United Principalities of Moldavia and Wallachia
- Died: August 10, 1927 (aged 59); Focșani, Kingdom of Romania
- Occupation: surgeon
- Organization(s): corresponding member of the Surgical Society in Paris; president of the Society for Tuberculosis Prophylaxis and Assistance for poor people with Tuberculosis from Galati and Covurlui county; member and president of the Medical Society in Galați
- Awards: Jubilee Medal Carol I (1906)

Alexandru Carnabel (born June 7, 1868, Gemeni, Mehedinți – d. August 10, 1927, Focșani, Putna County) was a Romanian doctor, a prominent personality of Romanian surgery, who, "having often modest means at his disposal, had a special activity. He stood out especially through his medical practice and not necessarily through his published studies"; he was mentioned among the first doctors in the country to perform a heart suture in the 1900s, an operation that, for that time, represented a remarkable surgical feat. For over two decades, starting in January 1903, his professional activity was carried out in Galați, at the St. Spyridon Hospital.

== Biography ==
Alexandru Carnabel was born in the village of Gemeni, from Oltenia, currently part of the commune Dârvari, Mehedinți County and attended high school in Craiova, then being among those who benefited from the pedagogic talent of the renowned surgeon Thoma Ionescu ro, founder of Romanian surgery, at the Faculty of Medicine in Bucharest, holding a competition to enter the boarding school (for 3 years) in 1892. He took over from his master's passion for the profession and care for the theoretical foundation of the medical act, later becoming one of his assistants at the Institute of Topographic Anatomy and Experimental Surgery in Bucharest.

During his specialization, he worked in several hospitals in Bucharest, and in 1903 he permanently moved to Galați as the primary physician and chief surgeon of the "St. Spyridon" Hospital (January 3, 1903). Having meanwhile become a military doctor, he also stood out on the social level, as the main animator of the actions organized by the Tuberculosis Prophylaxis Society, the National Society of Red Cross - Galaţi branch and the "Public Assistance" Society from Galați. He was a member of the initiative committee that organized the establishment of the Popular University of Galați in 1914. For 24 years, until 1927, the year of his death, he carried out an intense medical activity, recognized both in the country and abroad. Thus, he became a corresponding member of the Surgical Society in Paris, his name being cited in prestigious medical journals around the world, such as Deutsche Chirurgie (1905), Bibliographia medica (1903), Archiv für klinische Chirurgie (1906), Revue de chirurgie (1905), Revue de gynécologie et de chirurgie abdominale (1904), Archives provinciales de chirurgie (1901), in which Dr. Carnabel's operations and surgical techniques are mentioned.

In an era when the means of rapid communication were still at the pioneering stage, the news about the skill of the surgeon Alexandru Carnabel spread quickly, the doctor ended up being sought by patients who came, as if on a pilgrimage, from all over Moldavia, from Bessarabia and from Dobrogea. In addition to the operations he was doing, Al. Carnabel also contributed to the prevention of tuberculosis, a condition that was often fatal in that era. Through the interest he showed for public health, Al. Carnabel approached the world of the needy, whom he helped as much as he could.

Alexandru Carnabel was totally dedicated to his profession, but he also supported Romanian literature and art, being a founding member of some cultural circles or institutions, such as the "Cercul Cultural" and "Intim Club" from Galați. As Moise N. Pacu remarked, "Dr. Carnabel had succeeded, as president and surgeon, in making a transfusion of literature, especially in some evenings when the pagan temple of the goddess Fortuna became a solemn Academy, and the soirées - a big gala...".

In the period leading up to the First World War, the Galaţi branch of the National Society of Red Cross carried out an intense activity for the preparation of hospitals for the wounded; the main animator of this action was doctor Alexandru Carnabel. At the beginning of 1915 everything needed for a hospital with 120 beds had been collected, and by November 1915 hospitals for the wounded were installed in almost all the schools in the city. On 25 Aug. 1916, Carnabel was appointed Chief physician of the Galati Hospitals established by the Red Cross. As noted by the press of the time, "all the seriously wounded passed, in Galați, through the hands of the valuable surgeon Dr. Carnabel, who from the dawn of the day until midnight, during this period of agglomeration of the wounded, selflessly and wholeheartedly fulfilled this holy duty."

After Romania's entry into the First World War, following the military campaign of 1916, when two-thirds of the territory of the Romanian Old Kingdom had been occupied by the armies of the Central Powers, the doctor Captain Alexandru Carnabel was evacuated to the south of Russia the following year, together with several hospitals in Romania (totalling around 30,000 patients), becoming Chief physician of the hospitals in Odesa. After the war, he returned to Galați, continuing his medical activity until 1927, when his health caused him to retire from the intense activity he carried out with selflessness .

After the death of doctor Alexandru Carnabel, which occurred in Focșani on August 10, 1927, a committee headed by Cristache D. Theodoru, mayor of Galați, initiated a public subscription for the creation of a bronze bust of doctor Carnabel. The bust was executed by the sculptor Oscar Späthe and was placed on a plinth in Romulus Street, being inaugurated on May 25, 1931. Currently, the bust can be found in the courtyard of the "Elena Doamna" Psychiatric Hospital in Galați, and a street in the city also bears the name of the one who introduced "real surgery, based on science" to the Danube city.

== Brief presentation ==
=== Studies ===
- high school in Craiova, graduated in 1886;
- Faculty of Medicine in Bucharest (1892-1895)

=== Scientific titles ===
- doctor of medicine and surgery with thesis Câteva considerațiuni asupra terminarei facerilor în basinurile stramptate observate în maternitatea din Bucuresci [Some considerations on the termination of pregnancy in tight pelvises, observed at the maternity hospital in Bucharest] — Faculty of Medicine in Bucharest (1895)

=== Socio-professional activity ===
- external physician of the Colțea Hospital in Bucharest, at the Clinical-Surgical Service of Dr. George Assaky, specializing in surgery (1890);

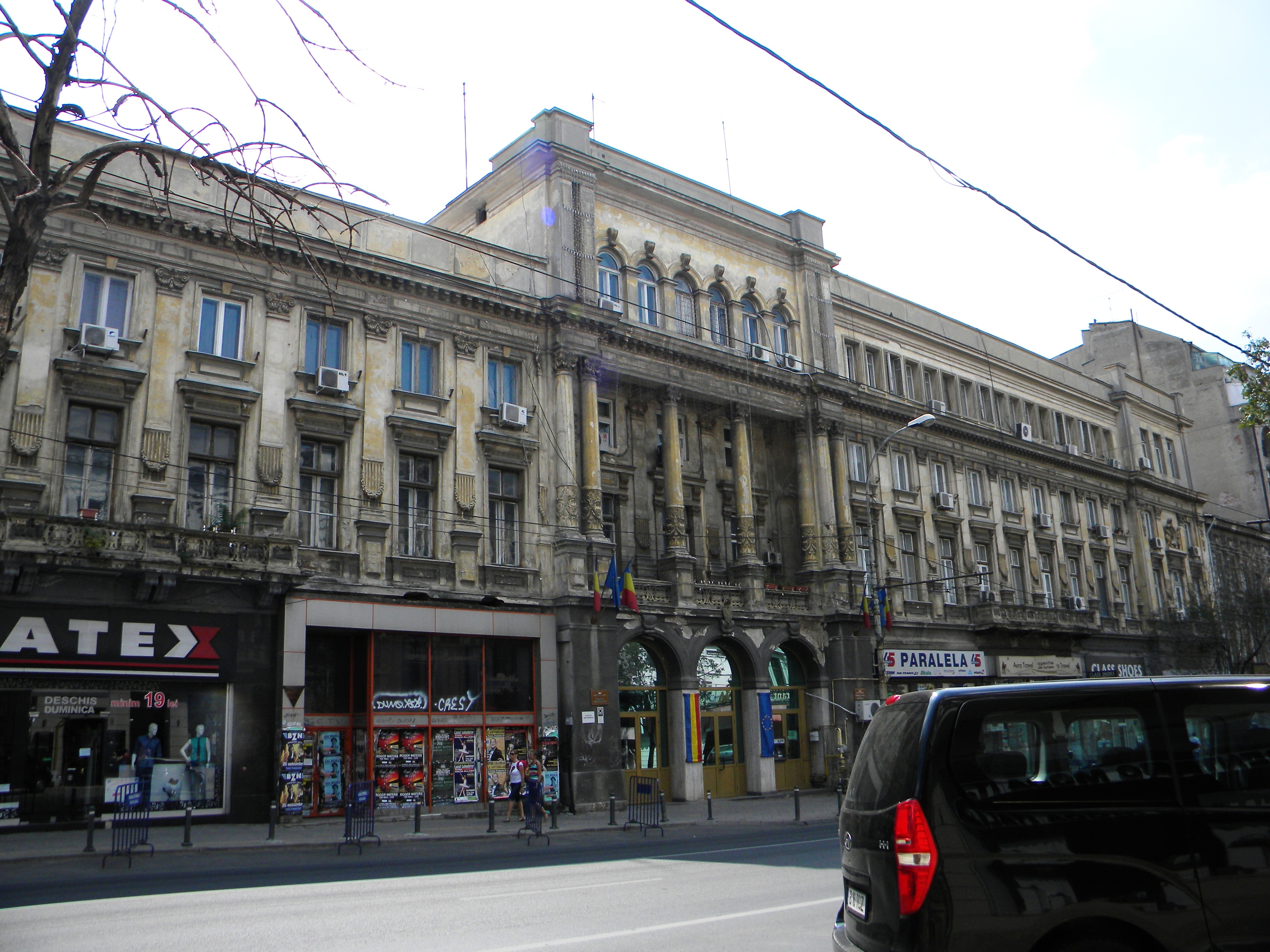
Palace of the former Eforia Spitalelor Civile, currently the seat of the Mayor's Office of Sector 5 of Bucharest

- internal physician of Eforia Spitalelor Civile (which included Colțea, Pantelimon and Filantropia hospitals) as well as of the Institute "Maternitatea" (1892-1895);
- editor of the medical journal Spitalul;
- he was promoted to the corps of reserve medical officers, to the rank of battalion doctor, by decree published in the Official Gazette no. 43 of 27 May / 8 June 1895, following the one-year internship required by law at the Army Powder Warehouse;
- was appointed doctor and director at the Rural Hospital Vidra – Putna County (July 1896);
- member of the General Assembly of the Eforia Spitalelor Civile from Bucharest (1898);
- secretary of the publication Bulletins et mémoires de la Société de Chirurgie de Bucarest (Jan. 1900 – Feb. 1903);
- primary physician and chief surgeon of the "St. Spyridon" Hospital in Galați (January 3, 1903), where he worked until May 1924;
- medical captain in reserve, was transferred on February 1, 1908, from the IV Army Corps to the III Army Corps, by the Decision of the Minister of War no. 26 of 25 Jan. 1908, published in the Official Gazette no. 243 of 5(18) Feb. 1908;
- main animator of the actions organized by the Tuberculosis Prophylaxis Society, the National Society of Red Cross - Galați branch and the "Public Assistance" Society in Galați;
- member of the initiative committee (1913) under whose care the Popular University of Galați was established, which began its courses on March 5, 1914;
- member of the examination commissions for the position of Primary physician of the Central Hospital in Iași (1916);
- chief physician of the Galați Hospitals, established by the Red Cross during the First World War (August 25 - December 25, 1916);
- president of the Committee of the National Society of Red Cross - Galați branch.

=== Affiliations ===
- founding member of the Cultural Circle from Galati, established on 14 Jan. 1907;
- corresponding member of the Surgical Society in Paris;
- honorary member of the Committee of the Society of Medical Students (from 1888, meeting secretary in 1889, general secretary in 1890, treasurer in 1891);
- president of the Society for Tuberculosis Prophylaxis and Assistance for poor people with Tuberculosis from Galați and Covurlui county (1910);
- member and president of the Medical Society in Galati (1916).

=== Collaborations in publications ===
- Bulletins et mémoires de la Société de Chirurgie,
- Clinica,
- Igiena satelor,
- Revista de chirurgie (from Jan. 1898),
- România medicală (1903),
- Spitalul (June 30 - Dec. 31, 1892 and Jan. 15 - Feb. 28, 1898).

=== Awards ===
- Jubilee Medal „Carol I” (1906).
