= La Gitanilla =

La Gitanilla may refer to:

- La Gitanilla, a short story contained in Miguel de Cervantes' Novelas ejemplares (The Exemplary Novels)
- The Bandits (ballet), a ballet based on Cervantes' story
- La gitanilla (1924 film), a 1924 film based on Cervantes' story
- La gitanilla (1940 film), a 1940 film based on Cervantes' story
