= Radu Rosetti (disambiguation) =

Radu Rosetti may refer to:

- Radu Rosetti (1853–1926), historian and politician
- Radu D. Rosetti (1874–1964), poet, playwright and attorney
- Radu R. Rosetti (1877–1949), general and military historian, son of Radu Rosetti
