= Radu Rosetti =

Moldavian, later Romanian, politician, historian, and novelist

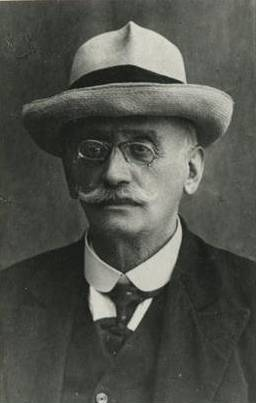
- Born: September 14, 1853; Iași, Moldavia
- Died: February 12, 1926 (aged 72); Bucharest, Kingdom of Romania
- Other names: Rodolphe Rosetti, Verax

Academic work
- Era: 19th and 20th centuries
- School or tradition: Traditionalist conservatism; Agrarianism; Poporanism
- Main interests: Social history; economic history; history of Romania; history of Russia; rural sociology; legal history; history of journalism; oral history
- Notable works: Pământul, sătenii și stăpânii în Moldova (1906); Pentru ce s-au răsculat țăranii? (1907)
- Influenced: Constantin Dobrogeanu-Gherea, Radu R. Rosetti

Radu Rosetti (Francized Rodolphe Rosetti; September 14, 1853 – February 12, 1926) was a Moldavian, later Romanian, politician, historian, and novelist, father of General Radu R. Rosetti, and a prominent member of the Rosetti family. From beginnings in traditionalist conservatism, he adopted progressive agrarian stances, and experimented with modernizing his estate in Căiuți. A Moldavian regionalist sitting on the left of the Conservative Party, he collaborated more or less formally with the National Liberal opposition during his tenure as prefect of Roman, Brăila, and Bacău. Also serving two terms in the Assembly of Deputies and briefly employed as general director of prisons, Rosetti adopted an anti-elitist and reformist discourse. This pitted him against Conservative chiefs such as Nicolae Filipescu and Titu Maiorescu, but he was protected by Lascăr Catargiu and, later, by Petre P. Carp.

Rosetti was financially ruined by his poor investments in the grain trade, and, from 1898, withdrew to secondary jobs in the Foreign Affairs Ministry. Although he lacked a formal training, he was a treasured polyglot, and achieved his notoriety as a scholar and social critic. His early studies focused on Moldavia's legal and social history, but later took up more politically charged themes. A mild antisemite and adversary of Jewish emancipation, Rosetti then turned to criticizing his own class and its manorialism, constructing an influential paradigm in progressive historiography. Welcomed into the ranks of left-wing Poporanism by 1906, he proposed a radical land reform and prophesied the peasants' revolt of 1907.

The early stages of World War I, with Romania maintaining neutrality, saw Rosetti campaigning for the Central Powers. He advised against any alliance with the Russian Empire, being fearful of Pan-Slavism and supportive of the Romanian claims in Bessarabia. He was disappointed when the country sided with Russia, and remained behind in Bucharest when it was occupied by the Central Powers; with Carp and other Conservatives, he organized a collaborationist bureaucracy, and served in it as Ephor of the Civilian Hospitals. Such choices contrasted those of his son, who became a war hero. Reunited with him in postwar Greater Romania, Rosetti still pursued his literary career, receiving accolades for his final works as a memoirist and raconteur. One of his "Moldavian tales" was adapted for the screen by his son-in-law, Victor Beldiman.

== Biography ==
=== Youth and early affiliations ===
The future historian was born in Iași, in the since-demolished palace built by Grigore Alexandru Ghica—Prince of Moldavia in 1854–1856, and Radu's maternal grandfather. On his paternal side, he belonged to the boyar Rosetti family, which included Antonie Ruset, who was Moldavian Prince-regnant from 1675 to 1678. Contrary to family legend, he was not descended directly from Prince Antonie, but rather from Antonie's brother, Cupar Constantin. The scholar's great-grandfather was Lascarache Ruset and his grandfather was Logothete Răducanu Ruset (1762–1838). The latter's career had peaked during the Russian invasion of 1806, when, according to Ivan Liprandi, he showed himself to be "simple but honest [and] beloved by all". In 1809, he produced a legal defense against the settlement of Russians in Moldavia, and on this basis secured his own deed to Covasna. During the Greek War of Independence, which was partly fought on Moldavian soil, he helped Gavril Istrati organize a guerilla movement against the Sacred Band. Upon the war's end, he also took over land owned by the proscribed Moruzi family, but sent them a share of the revenue; Alexandru Constantin Moruzi became his son-in-law.

Rosetti's father, the administrator Răducanu Ruset the Younger, studied philosophy at the Ludwig-Maximilians-Universität München. His mother Aglae Ghica was Ruset's second wife. Famous for her physical beauty, she had trained as an artist in Vienna, and, upon her return, became an ardent Romanian nationalist. Her husband had initially been an especially "savage" exponent of Moldavian liberal radicalism. Răducanu Jr began his political career in 1839, as Ispravnic of Iași County, then briefly served as head of the administration in the Upper Country (1843). He became a close friend and sponsor of Costache Negri, with whom he organized an 1847 protest against Prince Mihail Sturdza; that year, he also adhered to a boyar project for the creation of a commercial bank. Although he evolved into a conservative, he always felt solidarity with his tenant farmers, and demanded the abolition of corvées.

Răducanu and his brother Lascăr then took part in the abortive revolution of 1848, and were briefly deported to Danube Vilayet—alongside Alexandru Ioan Cuza and their brother-in-law Moruzi. Returning once Grigore Alexandru took the Moldavian throne, Răducanu served as Moldavian Vornic in 1852, when he oversaw the early stages of a project to publish a full corpus of the state archives. In 1855, he was Logothete, or head of Moldavia's Justice Department. As a government member, he acquiesced to the Russian re-annexation of southern Bessarabia, allowing the entire Bessarabian region to be confirmed as lost by Moldavia. This led nationalist Vasile Alecsandri to include him in a group of "venomous scoundrels", who had betrayed their country. During reduced-Moldavia's merger with neighboring Wallachia into the United Principalities, Lascăr endorsed the progressive National Party, while Răducanu became one of the leaders of a conservative faction in Moldavia's assembly, caucusing with former separatists.

Răducanu Ruset's coat of arms

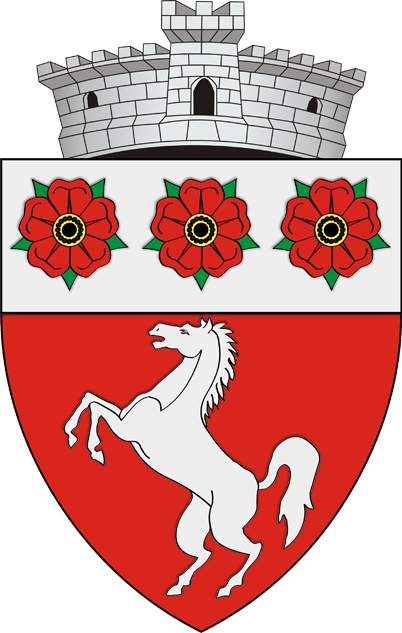
Modern-day canting arms of Căiuți, bearing the Rosetti family roses

The family owned the large estate of Căiuți, nearby the spas of Slănic-Moldova, which was the childhood home of Radu and his siblings (a brother and several sisters, including Ana and Margot Rosetti). A restless and adventurous child, Radu pushed his father Răducanu into building a cage to contain him. Later in his youth, he turned to more sedentary pursuits. A native speaker of Romanian, he learned Greek from his paternal grandmother; he later achieved fluency in French (his favorite language of expression), German, Italian and Spanish, and had a working knowledge of Latin and, from 1888, Old Church Slavonic. He also studied English, which he viewed as an "alloy" of French and German, by repeatedly reading the same untranslated novel: "On my tenth reading, I had learned English." He studied at Iași, Geneva, Toulouse (where he finished high school) and Paris, his only diploma being a Baccalauréat degree.

During his time in Switzerland, Rosetti indirectly witnessed the fall of France, with the surrender of the Armée de l'Est; he then became passionate about conservative and Legitimist politics, smuggling weapons into Navarre during the Third Carlist War. Upon returning home, he moderated his reactionary stance. As Radu Jr noted, his father became a "progressive conservative" who admired "State Socialism". Against traditionalists and elitists such as those from the Junimea school, Radu Sr reportedly believed that boyar privilege was a bane, and insisted that aristocrats too should work for a living. While he endorsed the United Principalities (and, from 1881, the Kingdom of Romania), he maintained a conservative dislike for the Wallachians, viewing Moldavians as structurally superior. Radu inherited Căiuți upon Răducanu's death in June 1872, and used its forest for hunting, which he generally did on horseback. He played host to important figures in Romanian public life, including Dimitrie Ghica-Comănești, Dimitrie A. Grecianu, Dimitrie Rosetti Tescanu, Anghel Saligny, and Alexandru B. Știrbei—thus, he cultivated both members of the National Liberal Party (PNL) and of the opposition Conservative Party. Sacrificing his dreams of becoming an engineer in order to supervise his inheritance, Rosetti entertained hopes of modernizing Căiuți during the transition from manorialism to full capitalism. Unable to adapt his lifestyle, he eventually succumbed to market pressures.

=== Prefect and writer ===
In June 1876, at Saint Spyridon Orthodox church in Iași, Rosetti married Henrieta Bogdan, the ultra-conservative granddaughter of poet Nicolae Dimache. Her father, the Moldavian artillery officer Lascăr Bogdan, had died years before, and she was chaperoned by a relative, Grigore Sturdza; her sister, Elena, was married to the Uhlan officer Mișa Sturdza. Well loved by his tenant farmers and passionate about advancing their causes, Rosetti served terms as a mayor of Căiuți. It was there that Henrieta gave birth to their children: Radu (in 1877), Henri (1879), Eugène (1881) and Magdalena (1882). In 1888, however, Rosetti and his entire family moved out of the manor, taking up residence in Târgu Ocna. Their new home was a townhouse once owned by Negri. This move followed a long dispute over land between Rosetti and his sisters, with Radu taking over ownership of Răducăneni, and conceding his manor to Ana; both estates were running debts and were eventually resold, leaving Rosetti inconsolable to his death. He continued to pursue his agriculturalist dream, investing his settlement money (against Henrieta's advice) to take up tenant farming in Urdești, on land owned by George Diamandy.

From December 1888, encouraged by historians Ioan Bianu and Bogdan Petriceicu Hasdeu, Rosetti published his first works of genealogy and agrarian history in the periodical Revista Nouă. Formally joining the Conservatives, his first important public post was as prefect of Roman County in August 1889. This followed the ascendancy of Prime Minister Lascăr Catargiu, who appointed Rosetti in hopes of curbing socialist agitation in the area. He resigned after a fairly short interval, following Catargiu's deposition. During most of 1890, he was severely ill after medicating himself on anti-obesity pills, and received treatment from Jean-Martin Charcot in Paris. He returned in 1891 and was elected to the Assembly of Deputies for a Fălciu County seat, in the 3rd Electoral College—then reelected in 1892. These were intense campaigns, pitting Rosetti against the opposition's Radu Ralea.

In October, he was named prefect of Brăila County, a job which he took because his wife's declining health required advanced medical services. As an outsider, he was asked by Catargiu to audit the local Conservative chapter, to the annoyance of a junior party leader, Nicolae Filipescu. Filipescu turned to sabotaging Rosetti's work; the latter contacted Bianu and, through him, PNL chairman Dimitrie Sturdza, to help him appoint a bipartisan council of reputable men. When news of this attempted partnership broke nationally, the Conservatives were irritated. After another series of challenges, including the cholera pandemic (eventually handled by Iacob Felix), Danube floods, and dockers' strikes, Rosetti moved on to a similar position in Bacău County in October 1893. He inaugurated an anti-corruption campaign and various public works, but also appealed to nepotism, such as when he ensured the victory of his protege, G. I. Donici, in the by-election for the Assembly. By April 1894, PNL agitators instigated the peasants against Conservative tax reforms, causing riots in Ardeoani and Răcăciuni. Voices in his own party called Rosetti responsible for the 17 wounded Gendarmes and the unknown of number of peasants brutalized during retaliations.

During his stay in Bacău, Rosetti made another enemy: his own nephew, the local Conservative boss Eugen Ghica-Comănești, who objected strongly to the program of reforms. In January 1895, with Catargiu still prime minister, Rosetti applied for a vacated government job, that of general director of prisons. He received his appointment and together with Vasilică Rosetti (a relative working for the Romanian Police), attempted to reform the prison bureaucracy and clamp down on petty corruption. At the time, the PNL newspaper Voința Națională ran a story according to which he had abusively chained the inmates of Mărgineni; Rosetti denied the accusations.

That October, when the government fell to a PNL one led by Sturdza, Rosetti was fired according to a tradition that a change in power brought about a wholesale replacement of civil servants with supporters of the new leadership. By then, his Urdești project had proved a failure, with Rosetti losing most of his investment to declining grain prices. Without a stable domicile, Rosetti lived with his Bogdan in-laws in Grădinți, then at a retreat in Agapia, while his sons were studying in Iași and Bucharest. It was here that he began work on his first historical novel, Cu paloșul ("With the Longsword"), fictionalizing the life and adventures of Bogdan I. It first appeared as a feuilleton in the Conservative daily Epoca.

=== Archivist, surveyor, and antisemitic polemicist ===
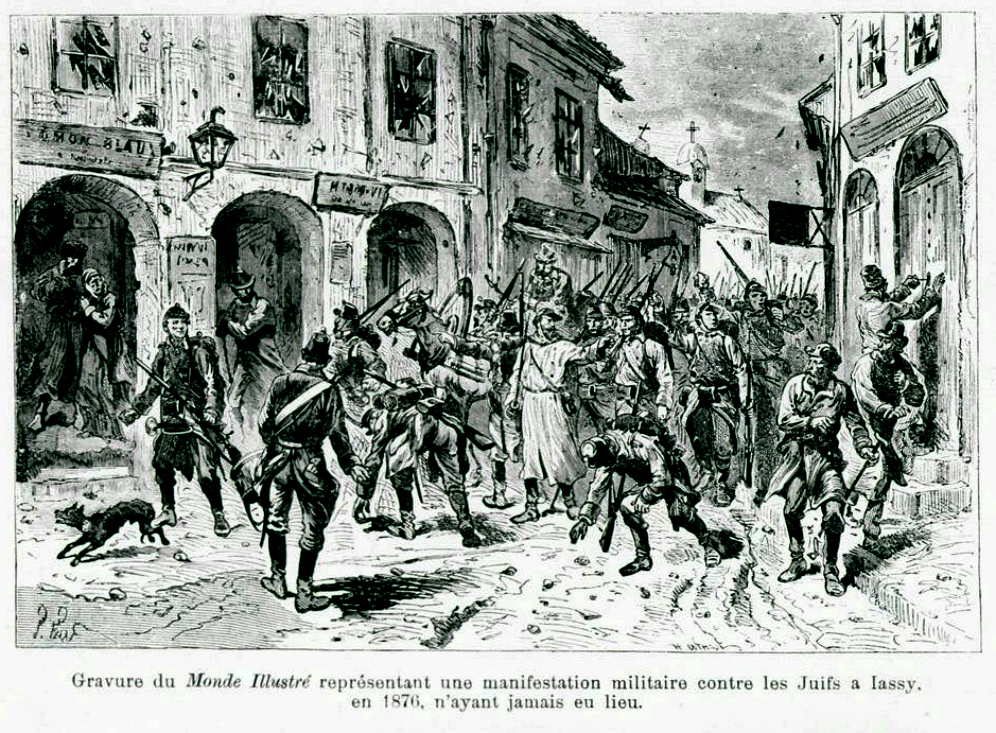
1876 engraving alleging violence against the Jews of Iași, republished by "Verax" with a comment arguing the incident "never happened"

In trouble because he lacked the means to live decently, and because his lack of a university degree meant he could not become a lawyer or a professor, Rosetti sought a professional job relatively safe from the vicissitudes of politics. At the time, the Foreign Affairs Ministry formed one such oasis. He applied there, and in April 1898, when Sturdza was both Prime and Foreign Minister, he was hired as the archivist's assistant, again helped by Bianu. His other supporter was Gheorghe Văsescu, a friend of the PNL factional leader Ion I. C. Brătianu. Although this new job was low in the ministerial hierarchy, his fluent knowledge of several languages (itself a precondition for working in the ministry) and his penchant for historical exegesis helped Rosetti advance. Nevertheless, the promotions came with a humiliating slowness and, with a wife, three sons and a daughter to support, he found the salary insufficient. Although the Conservatives returned to power in 1899, their new leader was Gheorghe Grigore Cantacuzino—Rosetti's patron, Catargiu, died suddenly the same year, leaving him virtually without friends in the party.

Rosetti was living in Bucharest, where he first rented rooms in Olbricht House, Sfântul Ionică Street, then moved in with his wife and daughter on Mihai Vodă Street, in Lipscani, and finally, in 1903, on Schitu Măgureanu Boulevard. By 1899, he was transferred from the archives to the special projects department, and also worked on the review commission for surveying the border between Romania and Austria-Hungary (dispatched to Vatra Dornei during summer 1900). He was made head of special projects in April 1902, when he also began surveying the border between Northern Dobruja and the Kingdom of Bulgaria.

Rosetti returned to his studies of history, with a genealogy of the Ghica family, published in 1902 by Convorbiri Literare. It became the topic of controversy, proving that the Ghica-Comănești branch, including his rival Eugen, were usurpers of the princely name, and descended from the Suldjaroglu family. By 1905 he had issued Cu paloșul, which enjoyed considerable success, as a volume, alongside other historical sketches: monographs of Răducăneni–Bohotin and Vascani, and a genealogy of the Răducăneni Rosettis. His review of Moldavian Catholicism and the Csángós parted with nationalist discourse in proposing that Hungarians may have dwelled in the Ghimeș-Palanca Pass even before the foundation of Moldavia. For a while, his research concentrated on Bessarabia, ceded by Moldavia during his father's time, and administered as a Russian governorate. In 1903, as part of his contribution to the Bessarabian question, he authored a polemic with the local Zemstvo; the latter had demanded cession over Romanian monastery estates in that region, something which Rosetti tried to prevent from happening.

On orders from Ioan Lahovary, he also began researching a tract on the history of the Jews in Romania. Published in French as La Roumanie et les Juifs, under the pen name "Verax", then translated by Rosetti himself into English, it doubled as a polemic with the Alliance Israélite Universelle (AIU), and specifically with publicist Edmond Sincerus. Nationalist historian Nicolae Iorga (who initially refused to name Rosetti as the author, since "I am not at liberty to say") viewed the result as a sample of PNL propaganda. He criticized the work as too scholarly and moderate, noting that it took official statistics at face value and, in doing so, underestimated the number of Jews actually residing in Romania. According to Radu Jr, who helped his father with statistics, the work responded to "the Jewish campaign against Romania" and "upset Jews both local and foreign." He argues that the "utterly objective" brochure defended Romanian antisemitism as economic protection rather than racial prejudice. A review in Journal des Débats highlighted the same core argument, but was cautious about Verax's neutrality. It describes Rosetti's text as "more of a profusely cited plea than the result of disengaged inquiry." On the AIU side, polemicists argued that La Roumanie et les Juifs amounted to propaganda or deflection. A 1904 reaction, published by The Jewish Chronicle, noted that "in Romania, the words 'verax' and 'liar' are synonymous". According to L'Univers Israélite, Verax's "venomous pen" produced "almost an official response by the Romanian government".

Rosetti expressed sympathy for Zionism, but mainly because he viewed it as a validation that Jews were unassimilable. The essay therefore insisted that Jewish emancipation was not an option, "focus[ing] attention on the direct contact between Jews and the Romanian peasantry". According to Rosetti, Jews prevented Romanians from becoming an entrepreneurial middle class. However, as argued by economist H. Bouët, he contradicted his assumption by noting that Romanians needed to be "pushed" by government expenditure into "trades, commerce and industry". Comparing Jewish immigrants to the Uitlanders of Transvaal, Rosetti acknowledged the history of pogroms, but argued that these were equivalent to other violence sparked by economic competition. The book also included respectful tributes to perceived Jewish talents, noting that it was "impossible to speak ill of the craftsman of this race", "a tireless worker [who] leaves no room for criticism"; Radu Jr notes that his family viewed Jews overall as a danger, but that they welcomed assimilated Jews and frowned upon violent antisemitism.

=== Agrarian historian and 1907 revolt ===
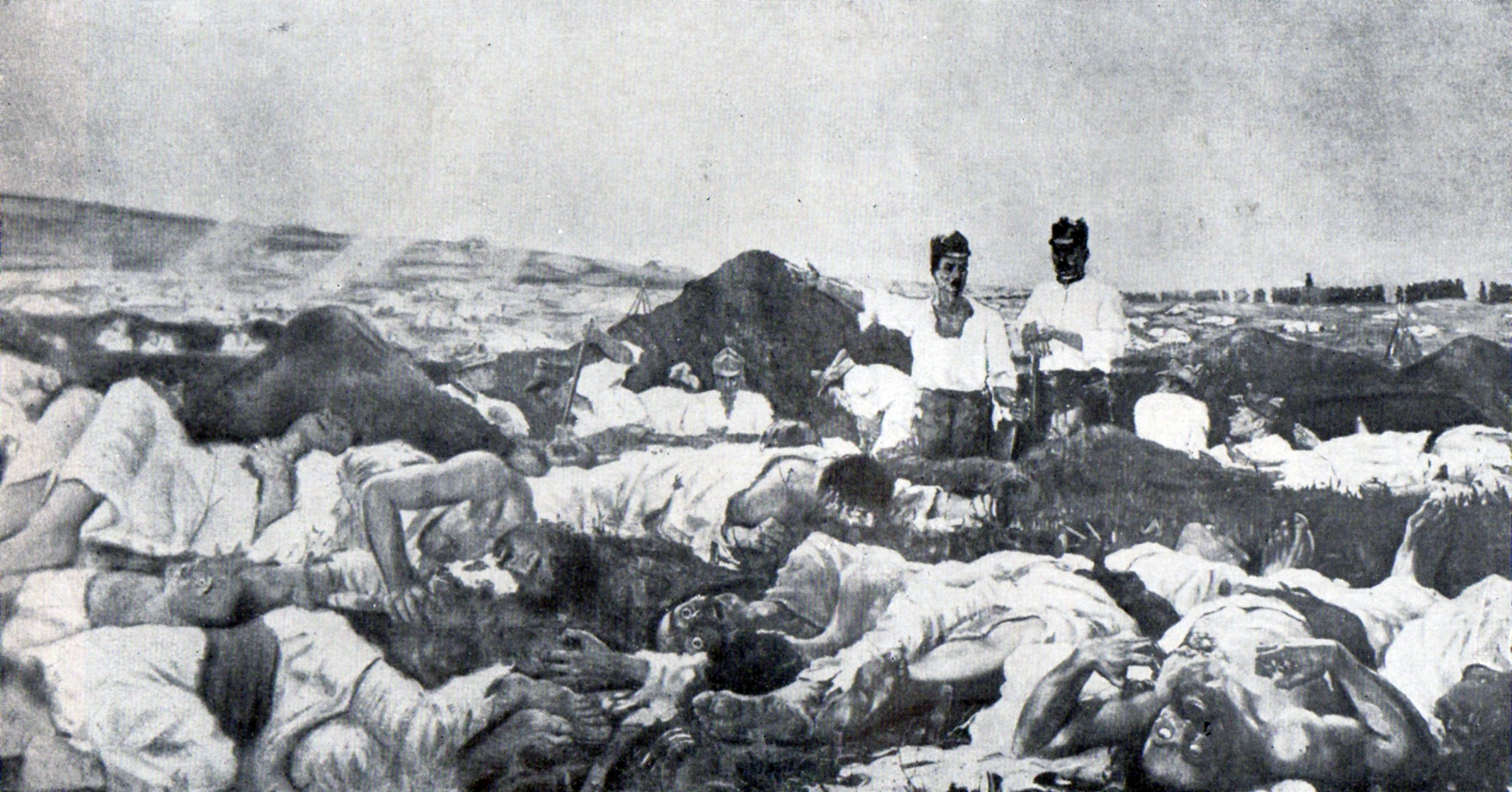
A Funeral, 1908 painting by the Poporanist Octav Băncilă, purporting to show a massacre during the recent peasants' revolt

Rosetti was a widower from September 1905, but enjoyed the moral and material support of his grown sons: Radu Jr was an officer and Henri a jurist, while Eugène had quit school and was prospecting for Standard Oil. He himself supplemented his income as an insurance investigator, assessing damages caused by hail. During this time, he became preoccupied with a looming social crisis. The first of his works to openly deal with the issue of agrarian inequalities and tensions over land was Despre originea și transformările clasei stăpânitoare din Moldova ("On the Origins and Transformations of the Moldavian Ruling Class"). His thesis looked back on the sources of Vlach law, suggesting that ancient Romanians were all free men organized into obști, that latifundia were imposed through boyar theft, and that serfdom was only cemented by the will of Michael the Brave in the late 16th century. Dealing more specifically with the genealogical claims of the Romanian nobles, Rosetti distinguished between an Uradel of knyazes and a later stratum of Phanariotes, with the latter including his own lineage.

As noted by medievalist Ștefan Ștefănescu, this account was fundamentally inaccurate, but Rosetti still had the "merit [...] of breaking away from traditional Romanian historiography, which idealized the past." Cultural historian Z. Ornea also underlines that Rosetti's "harshness", although "not entirely unique", set him aside from other boyar literati. His "vituperation", Ornea argues, "has its bitter source in his own biography." In passing, Rosetti also touched controversial topics of the more distant past, offering his take on Roman Dacia and the origin of the Romanians. He viewed initial Roman colonization as weak, and believed that the nation was created by the invading South Slavs and captives from the Diocese of Dacia. This theory was immediately challenged by Dimitrie Onciul, who cited early sources which appeared to contradict Rosetti.

Although Rosetti had kept his post under another Sturdza cabinet, Cantacuzino's return in 1904 signaled his downfall. His prophecy of an impending disaster clashed with the Conservatives' optimism, and he was pressured into resigning before April 1906. Without joining the PNL, Rosetti now sympathized with its left-wing and, beyond, with the emerging Poporanist movement, declaring himself disgusted with the Conservatives' National Exhibit of 1906. In December, he put out the tract Pământul, sătenii și stăpânii în Moldova ("Land, Villagers and Masters in Moldavia"). In the 1940s, Traian Herseni reviewed it as "one of the most precious works" of the period, a pioneering contribution to rural sociology. As noted by Rosetti's son, the work was much praised by Sturdza, but constituted an attack on the "sacrosanct principles" of Conservative theoreticians—above all Titu Maiorescu and Duiliu Zamfirescu, but also Filipescu, the "unrepentant reactionary"; Ornea also notes that Maiorescu was vexed and vengeful. However, in 1907, dismissing objections from Maiorescu and Ioan Kalinderu, the Romanian Academy voted to grant Rosetti its Năsturel Herescu Award.

The peasants' uprising of February, which seemed to confirm Rosetti's foretelling, had erupted outside Hârlău, but soon spread throughout the land, prompting Sturdza's return as prime minister. During these events, Radu Jr was tasked with protecting Jewish property in Bucharest against antisemitic backlashes. Rosetti put out his other key work of history later in 1907. Titled Pentru ce s-au răsculat țăranii? ("Why Did the Peasants Rebel?"), it argued that the uprising marked a reaction against the latifundia and tenancies. Building on earlier observations, he documented the survival of serf-like obligations under the guise of a new regime. As he noted, peasants being forced to pay for fodder and informally pressured or terrorized into reimbursing corvées, and often reduced to lassitude and alcoholism.

With this tract, Rosetti also emerged as a supporter of radical land reform, arguing that capitalism was remaking the village into a "plutocratic assemblage". As highlighted by economic historian Gheorghe Zane, Rosetti was a outspoken against previous reformists, who had allowed the perpetuation of boyar privileges, but also acknowledged that some large estates, "modernized and limited in scope", would need to be preserved to ensure agricultural productivity. His became the orthodox interpretation in Romanian historiography, with Rosetti being recognized by scholar Lucian Boia as a "rejuvenator" who "gave Poporanism a historical grounding." Critic Șerban Cioculescu finds that Rosetti stood with Dinicu Golescu in criticizing his own social class. He contrasts both with the views standardized by Mihai Eminescu, according to whom ancient boyars were well-meaning, while landowners inducted from the ethnic minorities had turned to exploiting peasants. Philosopher Constantin Dobrogeanu-Gherea, who coined the term "neo-serfdom" to describe Romanian labor relations, saw the work as "remarkable", "illuminating", and fundamentally compatible with his own Marxist sociology.

According to sociologist Henri H. Stahl, Rosetti had an overwhelming influence on Gherea, and this was unjustified: "[Rosetti] never properly understood the issue, as one cannot really claim to understand rural life only from documents and personal experience; one needs assiduous and rigorously scientific fieldwork." Gherea had had his own qualms about Rosetti's bias. He asserted that Rosetti had remained a boyar at heart, who dreamed of a Romanian "Junckerism" and rejected the notion of helping the peasants with affordable credits. Moreover, Gherea argued that Rosetti had not highlighted the conflict of values and morals between landowners and peasants, with each class having its own notions of justice and retribution. Instead, Rosetti blamed socialist agitators for the peasants' recourse to terror and vandalism. Similarly, Ornea notes that Rosetti kept the "vain hope" that the land issue would be solved by King Carol I, and that he partly subscribed to the discredited theory according to which Jewish tenants, alongside socialists, were largely responsible for the "crisis". Also a participant in the debate, Theodor Rășcanu observed that Rosetti had not been on the antisemitic side—like Rășcanu himself, Rosetti had not argued that Jews were the main culprits of 1907.

=== Anti-Russian campaigner ===
Throughout the year of the revolt, Rosetti also put out monographs on censorship in early 19th-century Moldavia, including the clampdown on Jewish literature during the Regulamentul Organic regime, as well as the tacit support for nationalist propaganda under Grigore Alexandru Ghica and its repression by Mehmed Fuad Pasha. His contributions to this narrow field remain recognized as the most relevant in over a century of research, although scholars have since noted their numerous errors of citation and chronology. He had been co-opted by the Poporanists at Viața Românească, which hosted his responses to critics, in particular George Panu. As noted by Poporanist Mihail Sevastos, the editorial team, including Garabet Ibrăileanu, were enthusiastic about Rosetti and his "lively spirit." This was also the terrain for clashes with the right-wing populist Iorga, against whom Rosetti was invoked as an authority, causing Iorga to withdraw his articles for Viața Românească. As Iorga recalled in 1934, Rosetti was a man of "unmatched conceit" and an "intelligent dilettante in matters of history".

Rosetti resumed his literary activity by 1909, contributing to the weekly Minerva and then to Iorga's Sămănătorul. When his eldest son married Ioana Știrbey (orphaned daughter of Alexandru B. Știrbei and sister of the more famous Eliza), Rosetti became in-laws with Ion I. C. Brătianu, who was now leader of the PNL, replacing Sturdza as head of government. Ioana died in 1914, leaving Radu Jr in charge of her sizable estates. Magdalena Rosetti married actor Victor Beldiman—brother of diplomat Alexandru Al. Beldiman. Readmitted into the Foreign Affairs Ministry in 1909, Radu Sr became department director under the Conservative Petre P. Carp, but resigned again in 1912, when his rival Maiorescu took over as prime minister. He remained active as a scholar, publishing in 1909 two books on the 1806 war in Bessarabia and the Moldavian diplomatic efforts, as well as two other monographs on Moldavia and Wallachia during the same interval. He also looked into the microhistory of property disputes, publishing his ancestors' ledger of land claims and, in 1910, a two-volume account of the 1850s conflict between the Moldavian government and Neamț Monastery.

Returning as "Verax", Rosetti detailed the conflict between Romania and the Kingdom of Greece in the brochure Grèce et Roumanie, printed in Paris; under his real name, he also revisited the "Jewish Question", putting out a tract on developments to 1909. The issue was also touched in the article Un proces de sacrilegiu la 1836 în Moldova ("A Trial over Sacrilege in 1836 Moldavia"), where he suggested that Romanians were naturally tolerant and Jews generally fanatical. The novel Păcatele sulgeriului ("The Sins of the Sluger"), came out in 1912 and sought to illustrate Rosetti's theories on the land question. It showed the brave but tragically flawed Mihalache, and 18th-century boyar who accumulates land stolen from yeomen and is punished by fate. The work is one of several in which Rosetti describes an "utterly despicable" droit du seigneur, allegedly exercised by boyars against nubile Roma slaves.

Although he still professed his Francophilia, Rosetti distrusted Russia, pined for Bessarabia, and, from the 1870s, wanted Romania to stand by the Triple Alliance and the Central Powers. He maintained this stance during the early stages of World War I, when Romania kept neutral. His 1914 brochure, Nici într-un chip cu Rusia ("Never but Never with Russia") highlighted the threat of Pan-Slavism and informed the public that an alliance with Russia would soon turn into a currency union, a protectorate, and eventually an annexation of Romania. Rosetti rooted in particular for the German Empire, since he could discern in its policies "nothing that would be detrimental to our own interests", but rather "our own salvation from the Russian peril."

The same ideology was taken up in three later tracts: in 1914, Atitudinea politicii rusești în țările române povestită de organele oficiale franceze ("The Russian Political Stance toward the Romanian Lands, as Recounted by French Official Channels"); in 1915, Adevărații provocatori ("The Actual Instigators") and Atitudinea României în războiul actual ("Romania's Stance in the Current War"). Here, he theorized that the conflict was the result of Russian intrigues and British imperialism, while accusing the Romanians of being poorly informed about their choices, "indifferent to the plight of Bessarabia and the Bessarabians." These Romanians included Radu Jr, who openly supported the Entente. All such works were published in cooperation with Viața Românească, which, in 1916, also put out Rosetti's answer to scholar Vasile Pârvan, wherein he reasserted his views on the origin of the Romanians. Rosetti was also a contributor to Carp's gazette, Moldova, a tribune for anti-Russian and Germanophile Moldavians; in May 1915, he reportedly joined an explicitly irredentist "Bessarabian League", that also included Zamfir Arbore, Petru Cazacu, Axinte Frunză, Nicolae L. Lupu, and Constantin Stere.

=== Wartime collaboration ===
Reportedly, King Ferdinand I read Nici într-un chip cu Rusia and approved of its content, although he found it somewhat "excessive". However, even in 1915 Rosetti could clearly read that both he and Prime Minister Brătianu leaned toward the Entente Powers. Eventually, in mid 1916, Romania declared war on the Central Powers. Following an abortive attack on Austria-Hungary, Romania was invaded by the Central Powers, suffering major defeats at Turtucaia and at Bucharest. King Ferdinand and the army, alongside a mass of refugees, withdrew to Iași; Romania, directly supported by the Russians, only held on to Rosetti's native Moldavia. As a loyalist soldier, Radu Jr fought with distinction and was severely wounded at Răzoare-Mărășești, earning the rank of Colonel.

Rosetti the elder remained behind in occupied Bucharest, where he rejoined a cell of Conservatives that included former prime ministers Carp and Maiorescu, as well as the Beldimans. His most controversial career move was open collaboration with the Germans and Germanophiles: in June 1917, he was nominated as minister in a putative Carp government. He ended up accepting a more minor position under Lupu Kostaki, becoming Ephor of the Civilian Hospitals. According to his son-in-law Victor Beldiman and his friend Bianu, Rosetti proved himself a staunch and dignified administrator, refusing to bow down to the Germans. Nonetheless, he was also involved in the intrigues dividing the Bucharest Conservatives. He supported Carp against Kostaki and Alexandru Marghiloman, and, the latter claims, promoted to high office favorites such as Jan Zaplachta. Meanwhile, with Beldiman, he also began collecting proof for a "Brătianu file", to be used for denouncing the PNL chief. Kostaki admired Rosetti, once referring to him as "my pal" and demanding that all Romanian patriots read his Atitudinea politicii rusești.

In May 1918, with Marghiloman appointed head of a Conservative-and-Germanophile cabinet, Ferdinand I conceded defeat, and Romania sued for peace. Rosetti disliked Marghiloman, and immediately resigned from his administrative position, but nonetheless viewed this moment as a confirmation of his predictions, calling for Carp to replace Marghiloman and bring Romania into Germany's orbit. In an open letter, while confessing his rekindled "hatred for the Germans", he demanded the ouster of King Ferdinand and his royal house. As noted by the monarchist Iorga, this document, the product of "bad fashion", caused great distress to Queen Marie. During the interval, Rosetti also began writing opinion pieces in Dimitrie S. Nenițescu's newspaper, Renașterea, where he issued reprimands against his erstwhile friend Brătianu and other PNL politicos. His other venue was Izbânda, the "independent democratic paper", which was heavily censored by the Marghiloman administration.

By September, the Central Powers were defeated on the Macedonian front, rekindling Romanian hopes for an Entente victory. Re-enrolled by the French Army as an adamant anti-German, Radu Jr mediated between Ferdinand and the Army of the Orient. Romania then reentered the war; its situation improved greatly with the German Armistice on November 11, which signaled Marghiloman's downfall. Radu Sr ran unsuccessfully for an Assembly seat in the November 18 election. According to Iorga, he still enjoyed sizable support from the Bucharest populace. At the time, Renașterea published his designs for land reform. Criticizing Marghiloman for his concessions to the peasants, these went back on his earlier radicalism, proposing the preservation of some large estates, in hopes that these would ensure competitiveness and the modernization of agriculture.

In December, Radu Jr returned to Romania with General Berthelot and the Entente mission. He then spent two years as a military attaché in London. His father then lived to see the creation of Greater Romania, which confirmed the expectations of the pro-Entente side but, thanks to Marghiloman, also included Bessarabia. As Radu Jr notes, he was "thankful" and felt no bitterness toward the PNL, being in this set apart from other Conservatives. Sevastos quotes him saying: "You don't even know how glad I am to have been proven wrong in my Germanophilia"—though also warning that any gains made were still fragile. Meanwhile his ideas on agrarian issues had a lasting an influence on late Poporanism, which, during the interwar, became the official doctrine of the Peasants' Party and then the National Peasants' Party. According to political economist Ion Veverca, Rosetti, Iorga and Dobrogeanu-Gherea were also exponents of a stage in Romanian economic theory, between classical economics and cultural relativism. Moreover, Rosetti's work on Moldavian village history became a source for Iorgu Iordan's research into regional toponymy.

=== Memoirs and final years ===
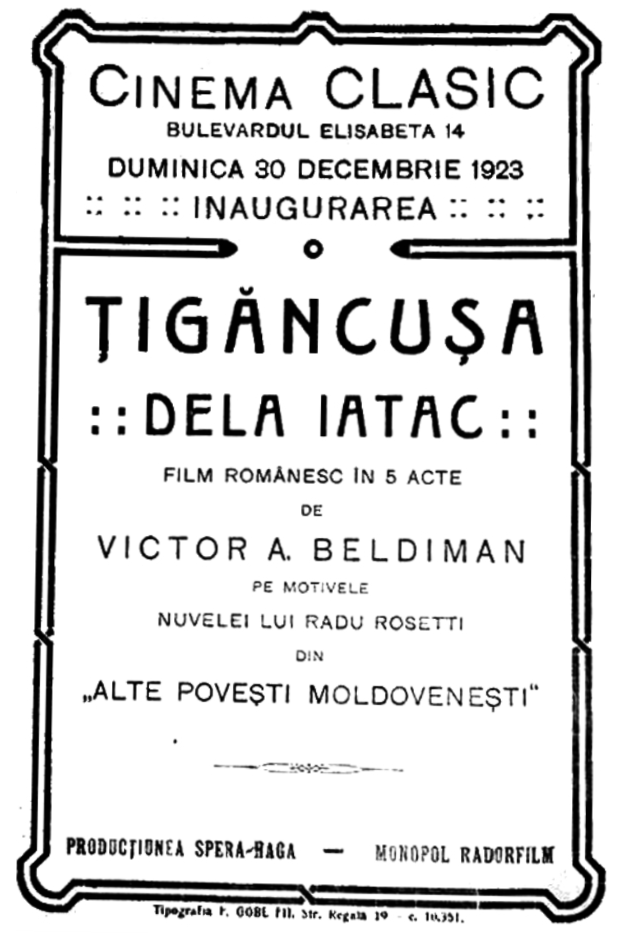
Poster for the world premiere of Gypsy Girl at the Alcove at Cinema Clasic of Bucharest, December 1923

During the first 1920s, Rosetti Sr spent his summers writing, invited by a landowner friend to share his manors in Traian and Filipești; he was reportedly working on his volumes of recent history, which included a (never published) voluminous account of the war, which he was to call O partidă de stos ("A Game of Basset", jibing at Brătianu's political deals). His rental arrangement ended when the estate administrator grew suspicious of the guest, and forced his departure. He was living on Ștefan cel Mare Highway in Bucharest, a "modest, shabby even place, the refuge of a scholar." Rosetti returned to publishing in 1920–1921, with two selections of "Moldavian tales" (Povești moldovenești). He followed up with a 1922 memoir, Amintiri. Iorga recognized it as a "precious" source, while writer Artur Silvestri called it a volume of "exceptional quality". Part of it doubled as oral history, collecting testimonies from Rosetti's elders, including precious details of conjugal life (one of "the shunned portions of out history"), of Jewish toleration and pogroms, as well as on the looting and raping by marauding Ottomans and the intermingling between Romanians and Roma slaves. In its polemical fragments, it showed glimpses of the author's Russophobia and critique of manorialism, with jibes against landowners such as Costache Conachi.

As noted by literary historian George Călinescu, overall the series showed the boyar class being "unbelievably obsolete", "dazzled" by "the new liberal society"; Rosetti's style was "always agreeable." Similarly, Ornea concludes that the "sympathetic reconstruction [they offer] can be considered entirely reliable as a document", but also "veritable literature." Critic Eugen Lovinescu praises Rosetti as one of the great and distinctly Moldavian raconteurs, placing him alongside Gheorghe Sion and Dumitru C. Moruzi, while Silvestri draws a comparison between Rosetti and his contemporary Constantin Gane, as two men who retold history with an "outstanding epic vein." The "Tales", fictionalizing Moldavia's more distant past, were noticeably more daring in subject matter and conflict. Praised by Călinescu for their accomplished narratives, they included episodes of double-dealing over land property, vengeful castration, and forced religious conversion.

By April 1923, he was again frequenting Viața Românească, at the Poporanists' new club in Bucharest. The modernist Felix Aderca, who also paid a visit, recalls that "lily-white" Rosetti was showing signs of senility, for describing medieval genealogies to a bindery foreman. Also that year, Rosetti indirectly contributed to the history of Romanian cinema, as one of his novellas became the basis for Alfred Halm's The Gypsy Girl at the Alcove. A lost film adapted by Beldiman (who also appears in it as Taverner Ștrul), it is noted for starring both Elvira Popescu and Ion Finteșteanu, as well as for its depiction of sexual abuse by the boyars on their female slaves. It was one of the most popular Romanian films of the period, surpassing the success of most foreign imports.

Rosetti's final scholarly work was a 1923 piece on medieval Moldavia from Lațcu to Alexander I, followed in 1924 by a third edition of Cu paloșul. His literary success was hampered by serious heart disease. This affliction also prevented him from engaging in his favorite past-times, which had included hiking and photographing life in the Romanian Carpathians. He was instead turning to graphology, producing personality certificates for Sevastos' daughters, based on their handwriting. During his final years, he had some of his fragmentary memoirs published in Adevărul Literar și Artistic, put out by his friend Sevastos. As the latter recalls, the aging writer could no longer climb up the stairs of Adevărul's office building. He also had trouble climbing into Bucharest's trams, which often had to stop for him to recover from his palpitations. As noted by Silvestri, he was "almost forgotten by his contemporaries", confined to his "refined but inopulent house". Rosetti died on February 12, 1926, at a sanitarium in Bucharest. According to Sevastos, his death was painless, though to the end he remained "lonely, unhappy that he could not complete his projected works". His body was buried in Bellu Cemetery, Plot 97.

== Legacy ==
In his obituary for Viața Românească, sociologist Mihai Ralea saluted the deceased Rosetti as a boyar turned progressive, and as such as an embodiment of generosity. According to Ralea, he had been Romania's answer to Philippe Égalité and William Ewart Gladstone; "in literature, Radu Rosetti has served as a Romanian Walter Scott." A second and final installment of Amintiri came out in 1927, with the "Moldavian tales" parodied in Viața Românească by Păstorel Teodoreanu. His work as a novelist was by then being brought into question. In 1932, Cezar Petrescu, himself a novelist, discussed Rosetti's work in that genre as once-valuable, but dated—placing him in the same category as Gheorghe Becescu-Silvan, Traian Demetrescu, and Alexandru Vlahuță.

The historian's eldest son, from 1924 Brigadier General Rosetti, continued his scholarly work and, in 1927, joined the Romanian Academy, presiding over the Academy Library in succession to Bianu. Although he detested fascism, he agreed to serve as Education Minister for Ion Antonescu during 1941. According to Boia, Rosetti's 1914 warning about Russia was inaccurate for its day, but "terribly close to facts" when contemplated in relation to the Soviet occupation of 1944–1958. Victor Beldiman survived his father-in-law for two decades, dying in July 1946—he did not live to see the proclamation of a Romanian communist regime in 1948. Implicated in the Antonescu trial of 1946, through the doctrine of collective responsibility, Rosetti Jr appeared before the Romanian People's Tribunals. Defense witnesses included the Jewish scholar Barbu Lăzăreanu, who asserted that, unlike his father (and also unlike Antonescu's other ministers), the general had shunned antisemitism, and had made a point of preserving Jewish contributions to Romanian culture. He was still ultimately sentenced to a two-years prison term, and died while in confinement at Văcărești; he shares Radu Sr's grave at Bellu. Magdalena Rosetti-Beldiman lived through communist persecution, sheltering Brătianu's widow in her own apartment. Her brother the general had left three daughters and one son, also named Radu. In 1944, the latter had been manager of the electric plant in Schitu Golești; he too spent time in prison, and was placed under surveillance, for his contacts with the dissident philosopher Constantin Noica.

At the time, while still cited as an authority on agrarian mattes, Rosetti Sr was formally designated "a historian of the bourgeoisie and landowners". His inclusion in Constantin C. Angelescu's 1964 overview of Romanian historical writing gave his birth date as unknown, and omitted mention of La Roumanie et le Juifs—errors which were signaled by the official magazine, Studii. Writing twelve years later, Silvestri noted: "The man, currently erased from literary memory, passes for an amateur, one who produced so-called historical novels which fantasize freely on the basis of some documentation. Not so! [...] Radu Rosetti [was] an intellectual with the most diverse interests, and, doubtlessly so, an exceptional writer." Following the fall of communism, the Rosettis' contribution was revisited, and their works republished—including a 2011 reissue of Amintiri with a preface by Neagu Djuvara.
