= Radu R. Rosetti =

Romanian brigadier general, military historian and librarian

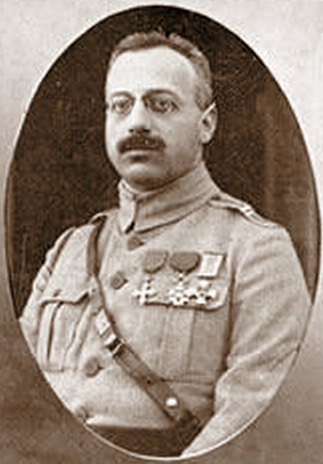
- Radu R. Rosetti
- Born: March 20, 1877; Căiuți, Bacău County, Kingdom of Romania
- Died: June 2, 1949 (aged 72); Văcărești Prison, Romanian People's Republic
- Burial place: Bellu Cemetery, Bucharest
- Alma mater: School of Bridges and Roads; Higher War School
- Spouse: Ioana Știrbey
- Relatives: Radu Rosetti (father); Emma Bogdan (mother)
- Military career
- Allegiance: Romanian Army
- Branch: Infantry
- Service years: 1899–1924
- Rank: Brigadier general
- Conflicts: World War I; Romanian Campaign; Battle of Mărășești
- Awards: Order of Michael the Brave, 3rd class Order of the Crown (Romania), Grand Cross class
- Other work: Director of the Romanian Academy Library (1931–1940)

Minister of National Education, Religious Affairs and the Arts
- In office 27 January 1941 – 11 November 1941
- Prime Minister: Ion Antonescu
- Preceded by: Traian Brăileanu
- Succeeded by: Ion Antonescu

Radu R. Rosetti (April 1 [O.S. March 20] 1877 – June 2, 1949) was a Romanian brigadier general, military historian, librarian, and a titular member of the Romanian Academy.

== Biography ==
=== Early years ===
Born in Căiuți, Bacău County, he was part of the old boyar Rosetti family. His father, Radu Rosetti, was a writer; he and his wife, Emma Bogdan, had four children: Radu, Henri, Eugeniu, and Magdalena. Radu attended primary school in his native village; in 1888 the family moved to Târgu Ocna, and then to Brăila, where the father was named prefect of Brăila County.In late 1892, the Rosetti family moves yet again, after the father is named prefect of Bacău County.

Rosetti pursued his studies at the Costache Negruzzi National College in Iași, and then moved to Bucharest, where he took classes at the School of Bridges and Roads from 1895 to 1897. He then switched to a military career, graduating from the Military School for Artillery and Engineering in 1899, and from the Higher War School in 1906.

On April 26, 1907, he married Ioana Știrbey, the daughter of Alexandru B. Știrbei and the sister of Elisa Brătianu and Barbu Știrbey. Two years later he commissioned architect Nicolae Ghica-Budești to build a house for them on Mihail Moxa Street, on a lot that came with his wife's dowry. The Rosetti couple had four children: Ileana, Radu, Ioana and Elisabeta. His wife died in 1914, aged only 29, at the birth of the fourth child.

=== World War I ===
In August 1916, at the start of the Romanian Campaign of World War I, Rosetti was a major in the Romanian Army, serving as chief of the operations bureau for the general staff at the General Military Headquarters in Periș. In this position, he objected to the numerous promotions made two days before the fall of Bucharest to the Central Powers, ostensibly to raise officer morale. He believed promotions for their own sake cheapened the meaning of rank and eroded respect for the hierarchy. Although he too was promoted to lieutenant colonel on 22 November, he noted in his diary that he was not at all pleased with the honor.

In January 1917 Rosetti was put in command of the 55th/67th Infantry Regiment, with troops from Piatra Neamț and Bacău, and garrisoned at Vorniceni, near Botoșani. In April he fell ill with typhus, and was moved to the Charity Hospital in Iași, where he stayed until May. At the request of General Constantin Prezan, Rosetti took command on 4 June of the 4th/72nd Infantry Regiment, composed of units from Ploiești and Mizil. With this regiment he fought fiercely at the Battle of Mărășești, under the command of General Eremia Grigorescu. On 19 August he was badly wounded by machine gun fire at Răzoare. He was then transported to the French Hospital of Notre Dame de Sion in Iași, where he was treated by Dr. E. Sorrel, and was visited by Ion I. C. Brătianu, Barbu Știrbei, and the Royal Family. For his bravery on the battlefield, Rosetti was awarded on 9 October the Order of Michael the Brave, third class.

=== The interwar ===
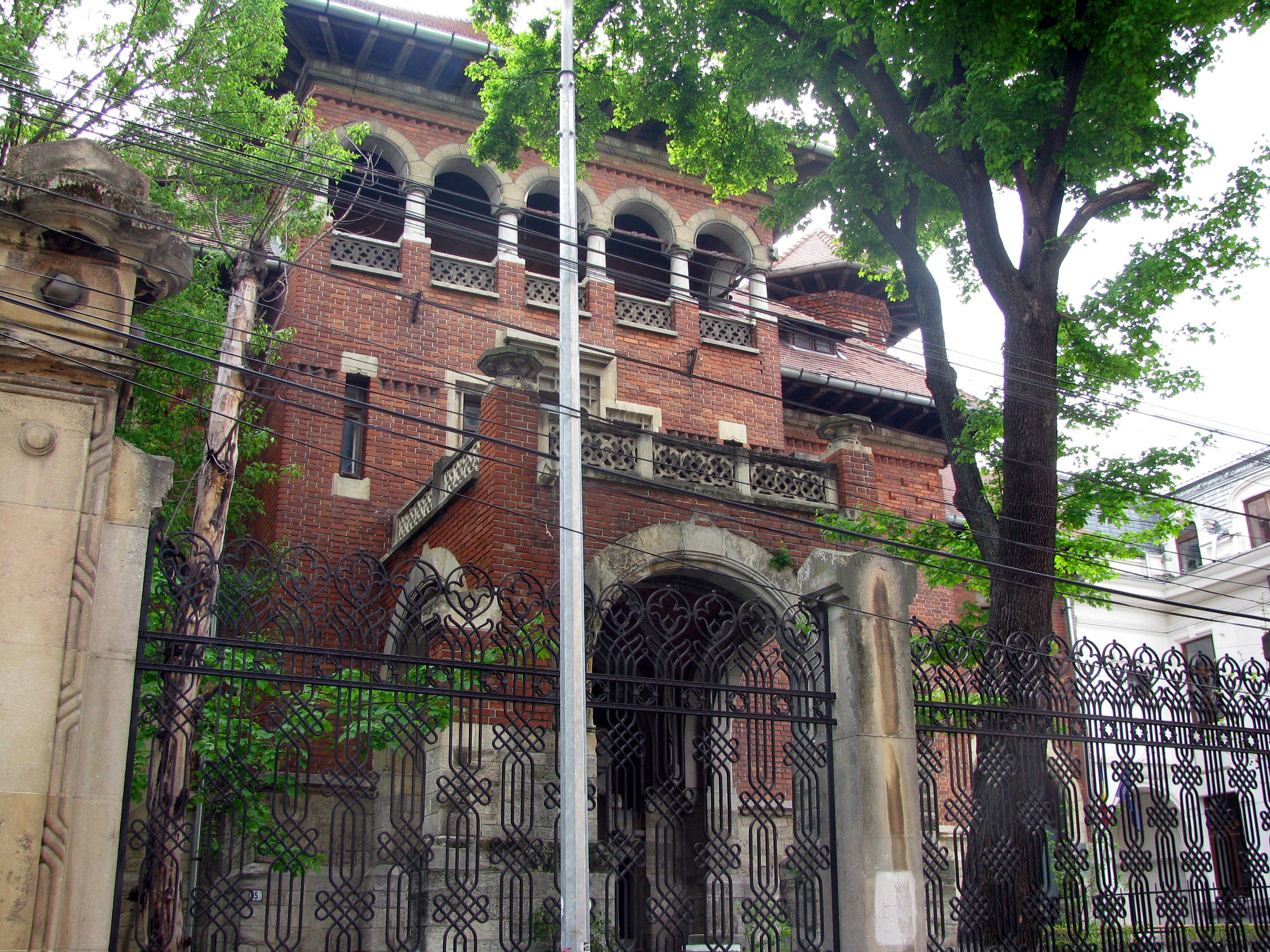
Rosetti's house, on Mihail Moxa Street in Bucharest

After the war, he served as military attaché in London, from 1 July 1919 to 1 October 1920. Subsequently, he was named commander of a brigade and head of training courses for high-level officers. In 1924, he was advanced to the rank of brigadier general. Continuing to deplore the large number of promotions made in the triumphant mood that followed the creation of Greater Romania, Rosetti soon resigned from the army. He authored books on military history and theory, some of them works of pioneering research. He headed the National Military Museum, an institution he had said from 1914 should be established. Elected a corresponding member of the Romanian Academy in 1927, he advanced to titular status in 1934 before being stripped of membership in 1948 by the new communist regime. He headed the Romanian Academy Library between 1931 and 1940, assuming the role at the suggestion of his retiring predecessor Ioan Bianu. As director, he oversaw construction of a new headquarters, completed in 1938.

=== World War II ===
In January 1941, immediately after the Legionnaires' rebellion was crushed, Conducător Ion Antonescu asked Rosetti to join a new government as Education Minister. A longtime opponent of totalitarianism, he reluctantly accepted, but resigned in November after ten months in office. He invoked health reasons, but the real cause of his departure was aggravation at the tension that had arisen between him and part of the ministerial staff, who found his inflexibility and integrity an inconvenience to their various arrangements. While in office in March 1941, he explained the motivation behind a decree banning Romanian Jews from converting away from their faith: "thwarting any Jewish attempt to hide their ethnic origin, which among the Jews is confused with their Mosaic religion; blocking Jewish infiltration into the Romanian national community; protecting the ethnic character of the Romanian people from the admixture of Jewish blood". On 7 November 1941 he was awarded the Order of the Crown, Grand Cross class.

=== Last years ===
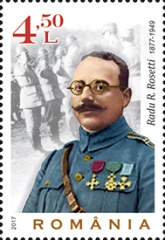
Postage stamp from 2017 (Scott #7305)

Rosetti subsequently returned as library director, where he continued researching military history and presented his findings in speeches before the academy or in published articles. Due to his participation in the Antonescu government, he was arrested in August 1948 upon orders from the Bucharest People's Tribunal. Under the principle of collective responsibility, he was sentenced by the tribunal to two years' imprisonment in January 1949. Rosetti was sent to Jilava Prison, where he was severely beaten. He died that June at Văcărești Prison. He is buried at Bellu Cemetery in Bucharest.

== Legacy and appeal ==
On October 26, 1998, the High Court of Cassation and Justice rejected the request to extend the annulment appeal, made by the Chief Prosecutor, Sorin Moisescu, in favor of Rosetti and several other member of the Antonescu cabinet who had been sentenced to between two and ten years of hard prison under the charges of war crimes, subordinating the national economy to fascism, and high treason.

In Onești, a street is named General Radu R. Rosetti after him. A school in Brusturoasa also bears his name.

In 2017, Poșta Română issued a 4.50 lei stamp in his honor, part of the "Eternal Glory to the First World War Heroes" series, which also includes Generals Ion Dragalina and David Praporgescu.

== Awards ==
- Order of Michael the Brave, 3rd class (9 October 1917)
- Order of Cultural Merit, Knight class (7 June 1940)
- Order of the Crown (Romania), Grand Cross class (7 November 1941)

== Publications ==
- Rosetti, Radu (1927). "Une supposition erronée sur la politique d'Étienne le Grand". Revue Historique du Sud-est Européen (in French). IV (10–12): 320–325.
- Rosetti, Radu R. (1933). "Mărturisiri, I". Convorbiri Literare (in Romanian). Bucharest.
- Rosetti, Radu R. (1938). Familia Rosetti. Vol. 1: Coborîtorii moldoveni ai lui Lascaris Rousaitos (in Romanian). Bucharest: Imprimeria națională. OCLC 895113055.
- Rosetti, Radu R. (1940). Familia Rosetti. Vol. 2: Celelalte ramuri (in Romanian). Bucharest: Imprimeria națională. OCLC 895335808.
- Rosetti, Radu (1942). "În jurul luptelor de la Plevna din anul 1877". Transilvania (in Romanian). 73 (11): 842–850. OCLC 898953191.
- Rosetti, Radu (1943). "Etapele cuceririi independenței". Transilvania (in Romanian). 74 (2): 91–102. OCLC 898953182.
- Rosetti, Radu R. (1947). Istoria artei militare a românilor până la mijlocul veacului al XVII-lea. Studii și cercetări (in Romanian). Vol. LXXIV. Bucharest: Monitorul Oficial & National Print Office.

== Sources ==
- (in Romanian) Vasile Secrieru, Radu R. Rosetti – istoric militar, academician și bibliotecar, in Confluențe bibliologice, nr.1-2/2006, p. 31-33
