= La gitanilla (1940 film) =

1940 film

- Directed by: Fernando Delgado
- Screenplay by: Rafael Gil; Antonio Guzmán Merino; Juan de Orduña
- Cinematography: Heinrich Gärtner
- Music by: Guadalupe Martínez del Castillo; Juan Quintero; José Ruiz de Azagra
- Release date: 10 May 1940
- Running time: 85 minutes
- Country: Spain
- Language: Spanish

La gitanilla ("the little Gypsy girl") is a 1940 Spanish drama film directed by Fernando Delgado. It is based on the short story "La gitanilla", from the collection Novelas ejemplares by Miguel de Cervantes. It was the third film adaptation of the story.

== Cast ==
- Manuel Arbó as F. Francis de Carcamo
- Estrellita Castro as Preciosa
- Concha Catalá as Doña Guiomar de Meneses
- Manuel González as Corregidor

== Reception ==
The film was received negatively by Spanish film critics, who thought it failed on a technical level. It received the award for Best Screenplay from the National Syndicate of Spectacle.
