= Nicolas Cordier =

French Sculptor (1567-1612)

- Born: 1567; Saint-Mihiel, Duchy of Lorraine, Holy Roman Empire
- Died: 1612 (aged 44–45); Rome
- Known for: Sculpture
- Patrons: Pope Leo XI

Nicolas Cordier (1567–1612) was a sculptor from Lorraine working in Rome where he was also known as Niccolò da Lorena or "il Franciosino" (the little Frenchman).

Cordier was born in Saint-Mihiel. As a sculptor, he primary produced religious-themed works which were executed for church commissions. Surviving works can be found in various prestigious churches of Rome and in The Louvre. He died in Rome in 1612.

== Works ==
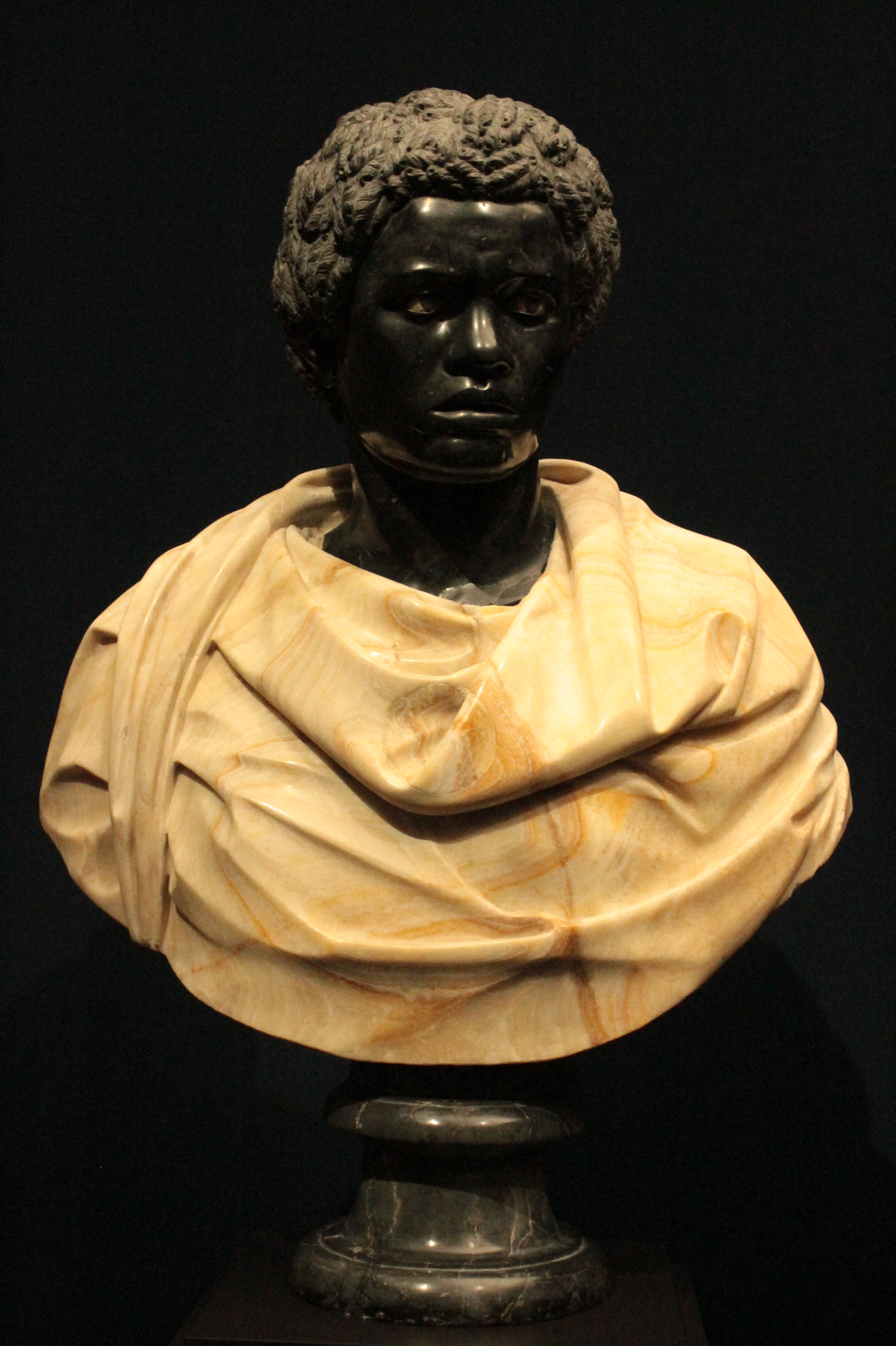
African by Nicolas Cordier, mixed marbles c.1610, Museum of Old Masters, Dresden

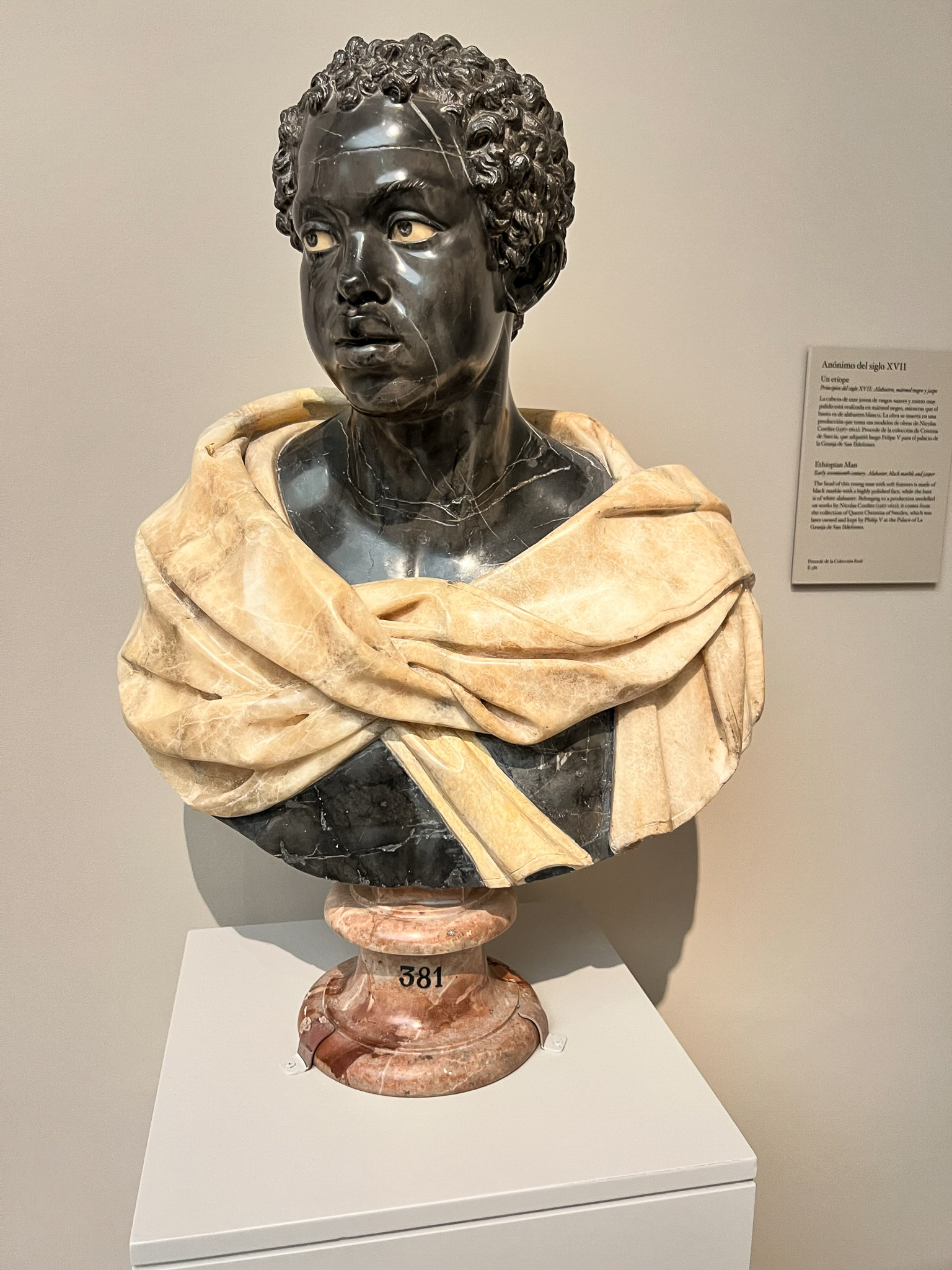
Bust by Nicolas Cordier, displayed in the Prado, Madrid

- Image of St. Agnes in the basilica di Sant'Agnese fuori le Mura, Roma
- Statue of David, Aaron, Saint Bernard de Claivaux, Dionisius l'areopagyte, in the chapel named "Borghese" or "Paolina" or "della Madonna" in the basilica di Santa Maria Maggiore, Roma
- Guillaume de Thiene, in the chapel named "Sixte V" or "Sistina" or "Crocifisso", in the basilica di Santa Maria Maggiore, Roma
- Büste Kaiser Aulus Vitellius
- La Zingarellain the Borghese Gallery, Roma
- Statue of Saint Gregory the Great in the Oratorio di Sant'Andrea al Celio, Roma
- Statue of Saint Silvia, mother of Gregory the Great, in the Oratorio di Sant'Andrea al Celio, Roma
- Statue of French king Henri IV, in the basilica di San Giovanni in Laterano, Roma
- Statue of the bust of Michele Cornia, in the basilica di Santa Maria in Ara Coeli, Roma
- Statue of Saint Sebastian, funerary monument of Silvestro Aldobrandini and of Lesa Deti Aldobrandini, statue of the Charity, statue of the bust of Silvio Aldobrandini in the Aldobrandini Chapel, in the basilica di Santa Maria sopra Minerva, Roma
- Statues of Saint Peter and Saint Paul (discussed), in the Abbazia delle Tre Fontane, Roma.
- Bust of an African. Museum of Old Masters, Dresden 1610
- The Ethiopian, Prado, Madrid

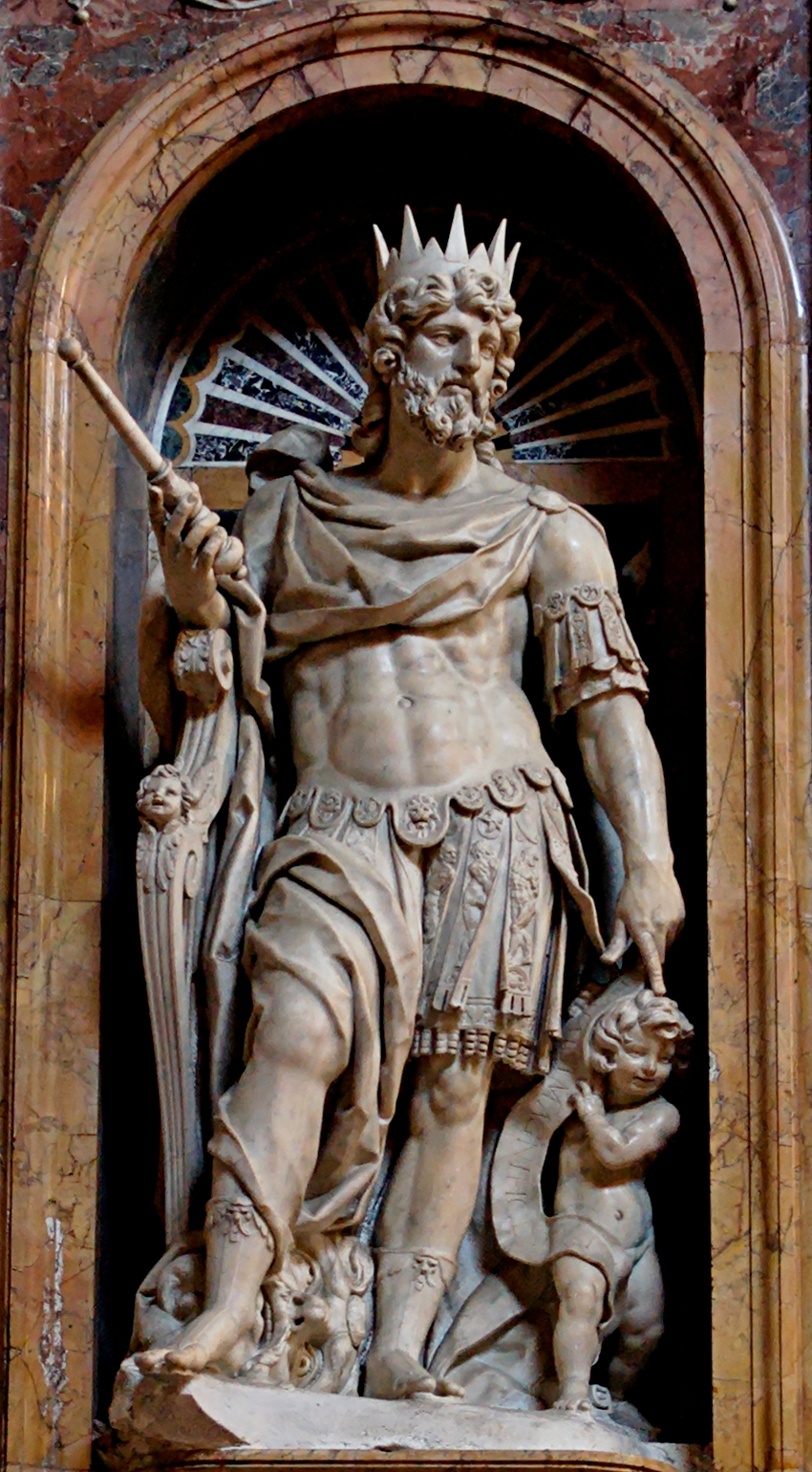
Statue of King David by Nicolas Cordier in the Borghese Chapel of the Basilica di Santa Maria Maggiore
