= Ion Finteșteanu =

Romanian actor

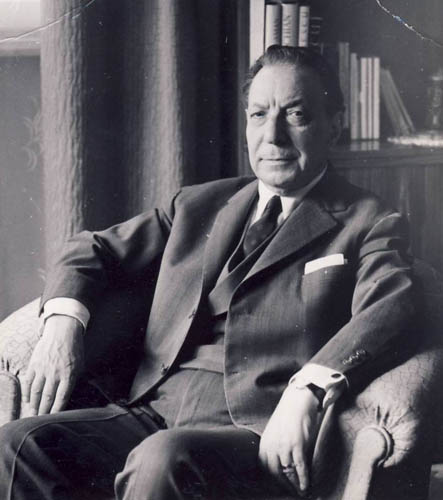
- Born: March 18, 1899; Bucharest, Kingdom of Romania
- Died: October 21, 1984 (aged 85); Bucharest, Socialist Republic of Romania
- Resting place: Bellu Cemetery, Bucharest
- Occupation: Actor
- Years active: 1923–1976 (film)

Ion Finteșteanu (Romanian pronunciation: [iˈon finteʃˈte̯anu]; March 18, 1899–October 21, 1984) was a Romanian stage and film actor.

He was born in Bucharest, the son of George Finteșteanu and Florica Comșa. He was played on the stage of the National Theatre Bucharest and was a professor at the I.L. Caragiale Institute of Theatre and Film Arts (IATC).

In 1971 he was awarded the Order of the Star of the Romanian Socialist Republic, 3rd class.

Finteșteanu died in Bucharest, aged 85, and was buried in the city's Bellu Cemetery.

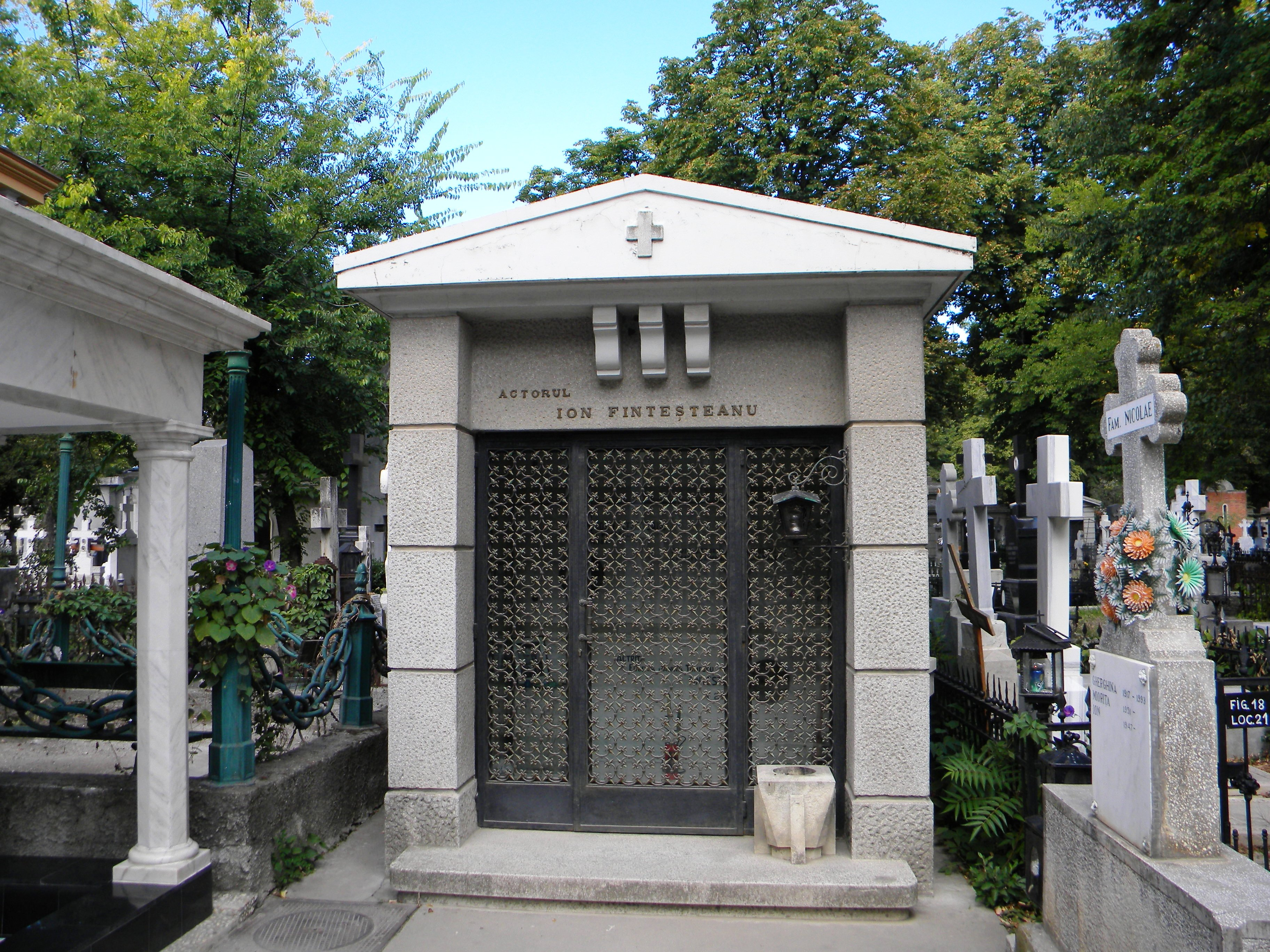
Finteșteanu's grave at Bellu Cemetery

== Selected filmography ==
- The Gypsy Girl at the Alcove (1923)
- Datorie și sacrificiu (1926)
- Bulevardul Fluieră vântu (1950)
- A Lost Letter (1953)
- The Protar Affair (1956)
- Citadela sfărîmată (1957)
- Celebrul 702 (1962)
- Vacanță la mare (1963)
- Titanic Waltz (1964)
- Runda 6 (1965)
- Haiducii (1966)
- Serata (1971)
- B.D. la munte și la mare (1971)

== Bibliography ==
- Goble, Alan. The Complete Index to Literary Sources in Film. Walter de Gruyter, 1999.
