= Dârvari =

- Commune
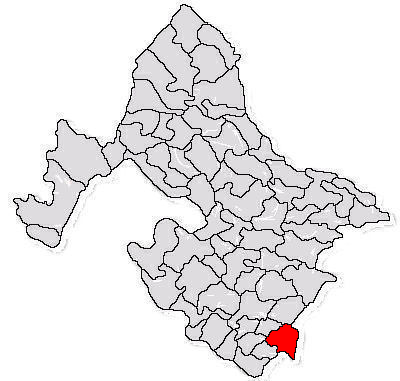
- Location in Mehedinți County

- Location in Romania
- Coordinates: 44°12′N 23°03′E
- Country: Romania
- County: Mehedinți
- Area: 64.8 km^{2} (25.0 sq mi)
- Population (2021-12-01): 2,090
  - Density: 32.3/km^{2} (83.5/sq mi)
- Time zone: UTC+02:00 (EET)
  - Summer (DST): UTC+03:00 (EEST)
- Vehicle reg.: MH

Dârvari is a commune located in Mehedinți County, Oltenia, Romania. It is composed of two villages, Dârvari and Gemeni.
