= The Gypsy Girl at the Alcove =

1923 film

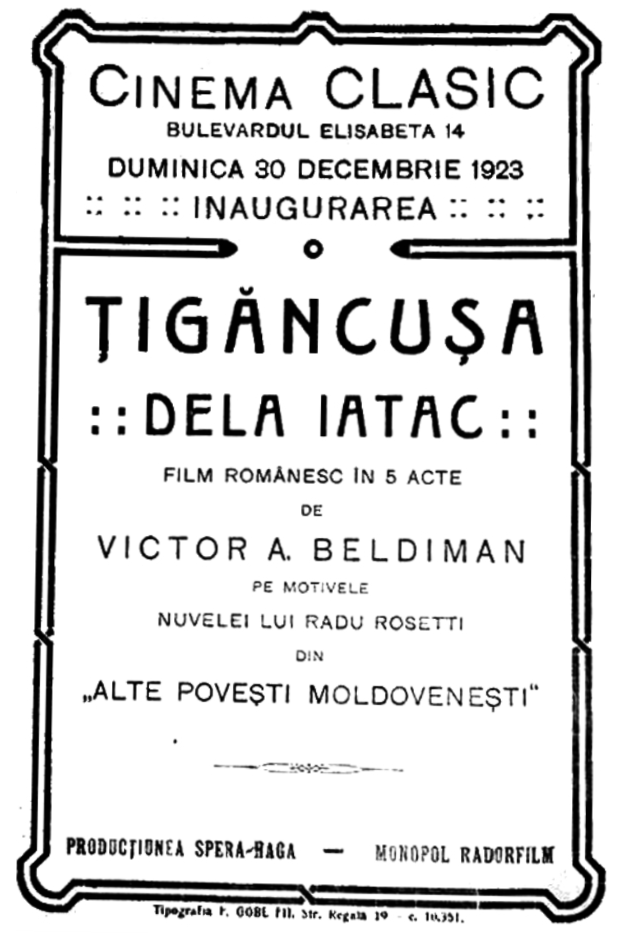
- Poster for the world premiere of Gypsy Girl at the Alcove at Cinema Clasic of Bucharest, December 1923
- Directed by: Alfred Halm
- Written by: Radu Rosetti (novel); Victor Beldiman
- Cinematography: Willi Briesemann; H. Muhlenheisen
- Production companies: Haga; Monopol Rador Film; Spera-Film
- Release date: 30 December 1923
- Country: Romania
- Languages: Silent; Romanian intertitles

The Gypsy Girl at the Alcove (Romanian: Țigăncușa dela iatac) is a 1923 Romanian silent film directed by Alfred Halm. The film premiered in Bucharest on 30 December 1923.

== Cast ==
- Alger Alexandru
- Balta as A young nobleman
- Victor Beldiman as Strul - the innkeeper
- Ion Cernea
- Charles Chamel as An innkeeper
- Jacques Chapier
- Stelian Crutescu
- Tantzi Elvass as Dochita - Anica's mother
- Ion Fintesteanu
- Jean Georgescu
- Dorina Heller as Anica - Hortopan's gypsy charlady
- Ion Iancovescu as Grigore
- Nicolae Kirilov
- Romeo Lazarescu as A gypsy
- Leon Lefter as Vasile Hortopan
- Dimitriscu Morfeu as A Greek
- Ion Mortun as A beggar
- Ion Murgu
- V. Negoescu as A young nobleman
- Lya Olteanu as Nastasia
- Gheorghe Pagu
- Stefan Petrescu Musca as Agachi - Anica's father
- Elvire Popesco as Maria Tortusanu -Basil's fiancée
- Petre Sturdza as Sandu Hortopan - a rich nobleman
- Maria Vecera as Smaranda Trotusanu
- Ecaterina Vigny as The old gypsy

== Bibliography ==
- Marcel Cornis-Pope & John Neubauer. History of the Literary Cultures of East-Central Europe: Junctures and disjunctures in the 19th and 20th centuries. Volume IV: Types and stereotypes. John Benjamins Publishing, 2010.
