= La gitanilla =

"The Little Gypsy Girl"
- Short story by Miguel de Cervantes Saavedra
- Don Juan en Constançe (Proef-steen van den Trou-ringh, 1636) A. Mattham naar Adriaen van de Venne
- Original title: La gitanilla
- Translator: Walter Kelly
- Country: Spain
- Language: Spanish
- Genres: Short story, exemplary novel, novella

Publication
- Published in: Novelas ejemplares de Miguel de Cervantes Saavedra
- Publisher: Juan de la Cuesta
- Publication date: 1613
- Published in English: 1846

La gitanilla ("The Little Gypsy Girl") is the first novella contained in Miguel de Cervantes's collection of short stories, the Novelas ejemplares (The Exemplary Novels).

La gitanilla is the story of a 15 year old gypsy girl named Preciosa, who is said to be talented, extremely beautiful, and wise beyond her years. Accompanied by her adoptive grandmother and other members of her gypsy family group, Preciosa travels to Madrid, where she meets a charming nobleman, named Juan de Carcome. Juan proposes to Preciosa, only to be challenged to spend two years as a member of Preciosa's gypsy family group, under the alias of Andres Caballero. During these adventurous two years, much is learned both by the main characters and about them, resulting in an unexpected happy ending. The main themes of the story include the making and breaking of stereotypes, female power and freedom, the importance of word, and the so-called truth behind the mystery of gypsy life.

== Plot ==
Preciosa is a 15-year-old gypsy girl who was raised by an old gypsy woman who calls herself Preciosa's grandmother. Preciosa grew up with her gypsy family group in Sevilla, Spain. The gypsies travel to Madrid where Preciosa makes her debut in a festival for the patron saint of the city, Saint Anna, where Preciosa is able to sing and dance for the public. She immediately attracts a great following as she is recognized as a wonderful performer, a great beauty, and a kind soul. On her second visit to Madrid, a lieutenant of the city stops to listen to Preciosa perform in the Calle de Toledo, and although he does not stay to listen to the entire performance, he sends a page to ask the gypsies to come to his house that night and perform for his wife, Doña Clara. Preciosa's grandmother agrees to perform for the lieutenant and his wife. After the performance another page approaches Preciosa with a petition to perform his poems, giving her a folder paper containing one of his romances for her to perform. Preciosa agrees and makes a deal to pay for his poems by the dozen, to the satisfaction of the page.

While the gypsies are on the way to the lieutenant's house, they stop when beckoned from a window by a gentleman. They are invited to perform for a group of gentlemen, much to the dismay of Cristina, a fellow gypsy maiden wary of spending much time with a large group of men. Preciosa convinces Cristina that there is nothing to fear, and the group of gypsies decide to perform for the group of gentlemen. One of the gentlemen sees the paper in Preciosa's hand and grabs it, sees that it has a coin for Preciosa within, and begins to read the poem, as prompted by Preciosa to do so. Preciosa critiques the poem and when questioned as to how she knows so much, she insists that she needs no teacher as the life of a gypsy is teacher enough to ensure that every gypsy is wise to the ways of the world at a young age.

The gypsy caravan then moved on to the lieutenant's home to perform for Doña Clara. Doña Clara was so excited to see Preciosa perform that she invited other ladies to come over and watch the performance with her. The ladies all fawn over Preciosa and ask to hear their fortunes told, but none among them could find any money to give. Only one among them is able to produce a silver thimble as payment for Doña Clara's and her own fortunes to be told. Preciosa has only enough time to recite Doña Clara's fortune by the time the lieutenant arrives home but promises to return the next Friday.

The next morning, on their way back to Madrid, the gypsies meet a handsome young gentleman who asks to speak Preciosa and her grandmother in private. The young gentleman reveals himself to be a knight and explains that he has become enamoured by Preciosa's beauty and talent, wishes to serve her as she wishes, and make her a lady of the court. The young knight presents the two of them with a large sum of money, as a means of proving what he can provide as a future husband to Preciosa. Preciosa insists on answering the gentleman for herself, asserting that her virtue cannot be swayed by money, promises, or schemes. She agrees to become his wife if only he agrees to her conditions: he must prove that he is who he claims to be, he must leave the comfort of his father's home, and he must live for two years as a gypsy, giving him time to awaken from the illusions of first love and learn about the woman he is so eager to marry. The young man agrees to these conditions as he has already promised to give Preciosa's what she wishes, however he makes a condition of his own, that Preciosa does not return to Madrid in order to avoid any harm that could come of it. Preciosa refuses to follow this condition, affirming her independence and asking that the young man trust her. They agreed that they should return to the same place in eight days, in which time Preciosa could verify his identity and the gentleman could arrange his affairs. The grandmother accepts the young man's offering with a great many arguments to Preciosa for why they should keep the money. The gentleman then pays the other gypsies for their time, after which the gypsies decide that the young man's gypsy name will be Andrés Caballero, and all continue on their travels to Madrid.

Once in Madrid, Preciosa is again approached by the page who wrote the romance for her, ready to offer another poem. The two discuss the position of "poet" and the art of poetry, and rest on the conclusion that the page is not a poet but rather a lover of poetry, and that he is neither rich nor poor, but rather comfortable enough financially to be able to spare a coin or two. Preciosa refuses to keep the poem until the page agrees to take back his money, which he does. The two part ways and Preciosa continues on her journey through the city to find the house of Andrés and his father. Down the street, Preciosa finds the house and is invited up by the father of Andrés. It is revealed that Don Juan (or Don Juanico, as he is called by his father) is Andrés's true name. The gypsies perform for the men, including Andrés, until a paper falls. The poem is read aloud, filling Andrés with jealousy, for which Preciosa slightly taunts him for being weakened by a piece of paper.

The awaited day arrives, and Andrés meets the gypsies at the agreed upon place. The gypsies take him to their camp outside of the city where he discovers he first lessons on gypsy life and Preciosa is given another chance to assert her independence. The group quickly departs from Madrid so as to avoid the recognition of Andrés as Don Juan de Cárcamo. After several days with the gypsies, and several lessons on thievery, Andrés still refuses to steal and instead actually pays for each item he claims he has stolen. Despite this, Andrés is able to add to the fortune of the gypsy group and gain as much fame for his abilities as Preciosa is for her beauty and talent. Over time Andrés and Preciosa are able to get to know each other better.

One night, the page-poet happens upon the gypsy camp while traveling and he becomes injured. The gypsies take him in, tend to his injury, and offer him sanctuary. Preciosa recognizes him and Andrés becomes jealous, as he is convinced that the page is in love with Preciosa. Andrés talks to the page and finds the truth, that this man is not in love with Preciosa but that he is in much need of help. The gypsies agree to help Don Sancho, as that is his name until renamed Clemente by the gypsies. Andrés remains suspicious of Clemente until the two become close friends.

After some time, the gypsies travel to Murcia and stop on their way at an inn. The innkeeper's daughter, Carducha, falls in love with Andrés and proposes to him. Andrés politely declines her proposal, angering Carducha enough that as the gypsies are about to leave, she plants some of her belongings in a pack belonging to Andrés and calls the authorities. The mayor’s son is among them and, finding the belongings in Andrés’s pack, he insults Andrés and hits him. Andrés remembering that he is actually Don Juan, defends himself by killing the mayor’s son. Some of the gypsies are arrested and taken to Murcia, among them Andrés, Preciosa, and her grandmother.

Andrés is held in the dungeons while Preciosa and her grandmother are summoned by the magistrate's wife. The noble status of both Preciosa and Andrés is revealed, leading to their freedom and happy marriage.

== Main characters ==
- Preciosa (Doña Constanza de Azevedo y de Meneses)

Preciosa is a 15 year old gypsy girl who is described as being a unique dancer, beautiful, polite, reasonable, and honest. Cristina, Preciosa's close friend, claims that Preciosa is wiser than a wise man. According to the story (and to the people of Madrid) Preciosa is outstanding in all her endeavors. She is so impressive that all would run to see her. Preciosa is presented as an upstanding member of her community and an exception to the stereotypes of gypsies at the time. However, the paradox appears that the best of the gypsies (the most beautiful, talented, and virtuous, as claimed in the story) is in fact no gypsy at all, as Preciosa is revealed to be Doña Constanza, the noble daughter of Don Fernando de Acevedo and Doña Guiomar de Meneses.

- Andrés Caballero (Don Juan de Cárcamo)

Don Juan is a young gentleman and noble who loves Preciosa. Willing to do anything for Preciosa, Don Juan gives up his title, becomes a gypsy, and risks death to be with Preciosa. In order to earn Preciosa's hand in marriage he must live as a gypsy for 2 years as Andrés Caballero. He is an honest man in virtue, refusing to steal when his new gypsy life requires it of him; he also doesn't mind telling a white lie to protect his gypsy image. He is jealous to a fault, especially when it comes to Clemente.

- Clemente (Page, Alonso Hurtado, Don Sancho)

Clemente is a devoted lover of poetry. Andrés becomes jealous of Clemente as he sees in what great esteem Clemente holds Preciosa, first through his poetry and again in person. However, Clemente assures Andrés that all he wants is safe passage out of the country. Clemente and Andrés become close friends.

== Minor characters ==
- The grandmother of Preciosa

An old gypsy woman, she is devoted to the gypsy life and embraces it completely, good and bad. Ready to make a deal and accept any payment, she is the money mind behind the performers.

- Don Francisco de Cárcamo

A nobleman that is entertained by Preciosa and impressed by her intelligence and wisdom, Don Francisco is also Don Juan's father.

- The biological family of Preciosa

Preciosa's biological father is revealed to be the magistrate, Don Fernando de Acevedo, knight of the order of Calatrava, and her biological mother is Doña Guiomar de Menesis. They rule within the jurisdiction of Murcia and are able to grant Don Juan mercy in his trial and allow him to marry their daughter.

== Major themes ==
- Truth vs. Deception

La gitanilla displays a dichotomy between truth and deception. This is most evident among the three main characters, Preciosa, Andrés, and Clemente (Lipson, 49). Although Preciosa is familiar with the art of deception in her professional life as a performer, she is also dedicated to the truth in her personal life (Lipson, 39). While she is able to convince customers of their fabricated fortunes, Preciosa is also committed to honesty and expects it from those around her. She refuses to engage in conversation with Clemente until he swears to be honest with her. At the same time, while Andrés refuses to steal due to moral conflicts, he seems to have no issue with the continuous deceptions he must maintain in order to keep his true identity a secret. And although Clemente is capable of lying, he is quick to tell the truth when pressed by both Andrés and Preciosa.

Another example of the dichotomous nature of truth and deception in the story is that of Preciosa's grandmother. Despite the fact that she has made a career out of deception, she chooses to tell Don Fernando de Acevedo and Doña Guiomar de Meneses the truth about her kidnapping of their daughter, Preciosa. Then in an ironic twist, and perhaps in order to drive home the strong stereotypes of gypsies as liars and swindlers, Don Fernando and Doña Guiomar refuse to believe the old gypsy woman until they see proof. Everyone was quick to believe her throughout her deception, but as soon as she chooses to be honest she is no longer credible (Lipson, 38).

It is also possible to see this concept of truth vs. deception when looking at the true identities of Preciosa (Doña Constanza), Andrés (Don Juan), and Clemente (Don Sancho), all living under false gypsy names. Preciosa lives a life of deception out of circumstance, she makes no choice to do so, this was just the lot she was given. Andrés, on the other hand, chooses this life of deception out of love for Preciosa. Clemente is forced into living in deception out of necessity to preserve his life. Each has a hidden truth, even though Preciosa is not aware of hers until the end of the story.

- Gypsy Life

La gitanilla depicts two versions of what the gypsy life is like. The first depiction is that of the stereotypical understanding of what it means to be a gypsy. This is initially introduced to the reader in the very first sentence of the story, "It would almost seem that the Gitanos and Gitanas, or male and female gipsies, had been sent into the world for the sole purpose of thieving. Born of parents who are thieves, reared among thieves, and educated as thieves, they finally go forth perfected in their vocation, accomplished at all points, and ready for every species of roguery. In them the love of thieving, and the ability to exercise it, are qualities inseparable from their existence, and never lost until the hour of their death." Cervantes supports this first depiction when Preciosa denies the monetary gift offered by Don Juan when he first proposes marriage only to be reprimanded by her grandmother under the guise of maintaining the reputation of gypsies: "I do not choose that the gitanas should lose, through my fault, the reputation they have had for long ages of being greedy of lucre. Would you have me lose a hundred crowns, Preciosa?" Andrés is able to see this version of the gypsy life first hand when the old gypsy man assigned to introduce him to his new life explains that they make a living by stealing, in which he refuses to participate.

The second depiction of the gypsy life is that of the exceptional gypsies. The reader is slowly introduced to this version through the character of Preciosa. Michael Gerli explains that, "Her actions, while at once incorporating the wit and liveliness of a gypsy, do not wholly conform with our expectations that all gypsies are thieves" (32). Preciosa is depicted as beautiful, talented, intelligent, wise beyond her years, honest, and trustworthy. It appears that Cervantes is attempting to acknowledge a version of the gypsy life completely contrary to the stereotypical depiction. The problem comes in at the end of the story, in that moment of anagnorisis, when it is revealed that Preciosa is not a true gypsy girl but rather a young woman of noble birth. Are the readers still able to hold on to this exceptional depiction of gypsy life as true when the main example is found to be based on a lie? Another argument is that, although Preciosa may have been born noble, she was raised a gypsy just as much as any of her peers which raises the issue of nature vs. nurture. Is it more important that she was born as a noble or that she was raised as a gypsy? Cervantes leaves us with this moment of irony, perhaps to force his audience to question whether or not it really matters that the so-called best gypsy was actually no gypsy at all.

Apart from these two very different versions of the life, gypsy culture is slightly revealed in the story as well. The reader is able to see the importance of music, poetry, dance, and the oral tradition for the gypsy people. Through the prevalence of songs and poems as well as the descriptions of dances and fortune-tellings, Cervantes shows mainstream Spain the art behind a group of people often ostracized. The moral codes of the gypsy people are also addressed via the conversation between Andrés and the old gypsy man, upon his arrival to the compound. This dialogue unfolds a moral code in which marriage, love, and fidelity are all very important and integral to the gypsy life. Throughout the story the reader is also able to see the emphasis on community within the gypsy culture. The gypsies work together as a group, live together as a group, and travel together as a group. Although the negative stereotypes may be sustained by some aspects of the story, some very positive facets of the community are also supported by the text.

== See also ==
- La gitanilla, film adaptation of 1924.
- La gitanilla, film adaptation of 1940.

== Bibliography ==
- Castellano, Irene Gómez (2009). "Copia y cornucopia: La abundancia en "La gitanilla" de Cervantes". Hispanófila. 155 (155): 21–39. doi:10.1353/hsf.2009.0015. JSTOR 43895206. S2CID 143826879. Project MUSE 477749.
- Gerli, Michael (Spring 1986). "Romance and Novel: Idealism and Irony in La Gitanilla". Cervantes. 6 (1): 29–38.
- Güntert, Georges (1990). "Discurso social y discurso individual en La Gitanilla" [Social discourse and individual discourse in La Gitanilla] (PDF). Actas del I Coloquio Internacional de la Asociación de Cervantistas (in Spanish). pp. 249–257. ISBN 84-7658-242-0.
- Güntert, Georges (1972). "'La gitanilla' y la poética de Cervantes" ['La gitanilla' and the poetics of Cervantes]. Boletín de la Real Academia Española (in Spanish). 52 (195): 107–134.
- Lipson, Lesley (Spring 1989). "'La palabra hecha nada': Mendacious Discourse in La Gitanilla" ['The word made nothing': Mendacious Discourse in La Gitanilla]. Cervantes (in Spanish). 9 (1).
- Nelson, Bradley J. (3 April 2014). "Knowledge (scientia), Fiction, and the Other in Cervantes's La Gitanilla". Romance Quarterly. 61 (2): 125–137. doi:10.1080/08831157.2014.878636. S2CID 170641060.
- Presberg, Charles D. (1998). "Precious Exchanges: The Poetics of Desire, Power, and Reciprocity in Cervantes's La gitanilla". Cervantes. 18 (2): 53–73.
- Pym, Richard (April 2006). "The Errant Fortunes of 'La gitanilla' and Cervantes's Performing Gypsies". Journal of Iberian and Latin American Studies. 12 (1): 15–37. doi:10.1080/14701840600704417. S2CID 162261508.
- Smith, Wendell P. (2015). "What's in a Name: Andrés Caballero and Chivalric Romance in 'La gitanilla'". Cervantes: Bulletin of the Cervantes Society of America. 35 (1): 153–180. doi:10.1353/cer.2015.0010. Gale A439362259 Project MUSE 601672 ProQuest 1862887845.
- Weber, Alison (1994). "Pentimento: The Parodic Text of "La Gitanilla"". Hispanic Review. 62 (1): 59–75. doi:10.2307/474431. JSTOR 474431. ProQuest 1290320097.
- Williamson, Edwin (November 2011). "'La bonita confiancita': Deception, Trust and the Figure of Poetry in La gitanilla". Bulletin of Spanish Studies. 88 (7–8): 25–38. doi:10.1080/14753820.2011.620301. S2CID 192128870.
