= La Zingarella (Cordier) =

Statue by Nicolas Cordier

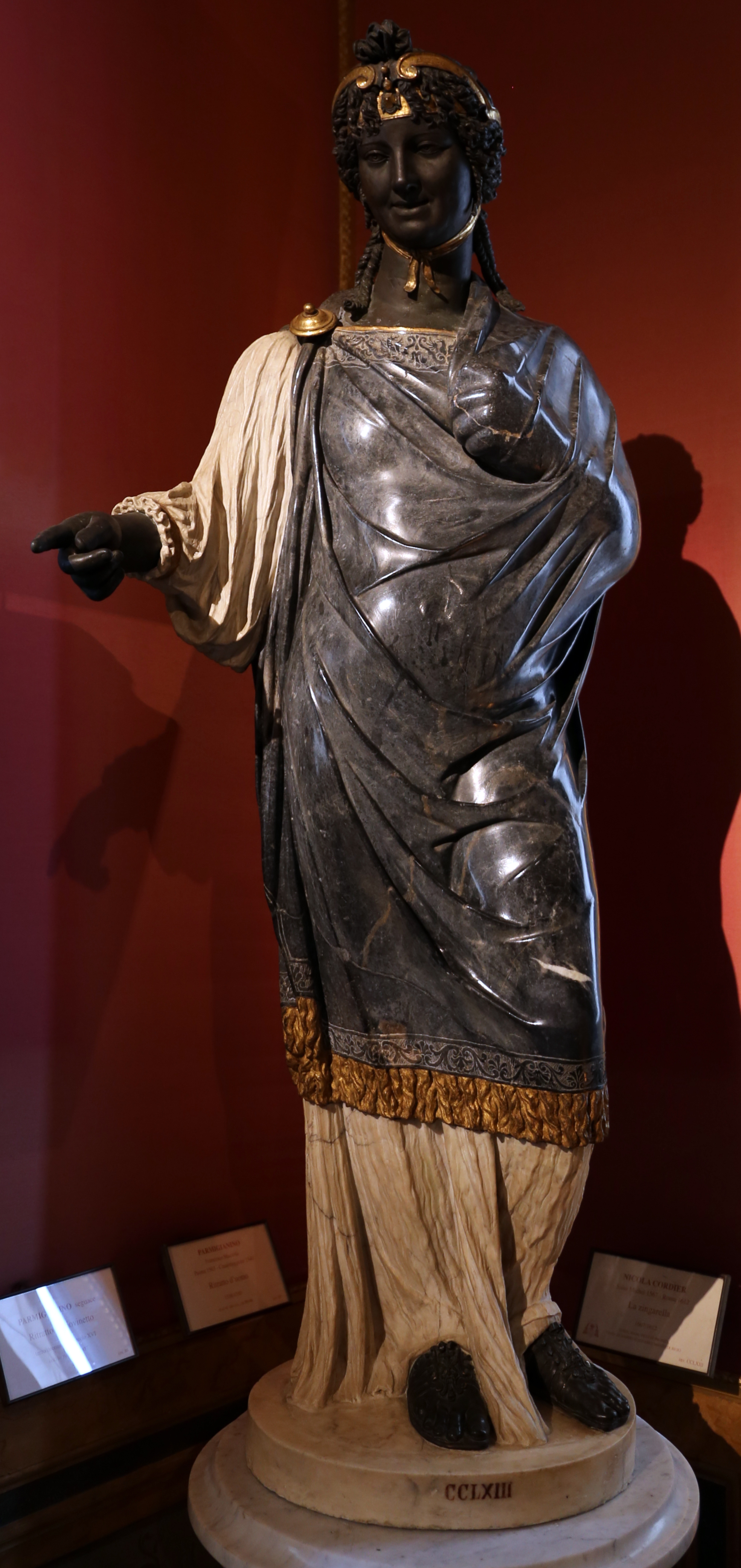
- Artist: Nicolas Cordier
- Year: sometime between 1607 and 1612
- Dimensions: 140 cm (55 in)
- Location: Galleria Borghese, Rome; 41.914358°N 12.491895°E

La Zingarella or Gypsy Girl is a 140 centimetres (55 in) tall statue of Diana, a combination of an ancient body with additions commissioned by Cardinal Scipione Borghese and executed by Nicolas Cordier, between 1607 and 1612. The additions, a head and the extremities of the body, were in bronze, and white and grey marble. It is on display in Room X in the Galleria Borghese in Rome, Italy.

== Description ==
This statue is a hybrid of an ancient grey marble torso, and Cordier's white marble and gilded bronze. Recent restoration, which removed a thick black patina added to tone down the statue to suit 19th-century taste, revealed a gold clasp. Its assembly from ancient and modern elements makes it an exotic, almost orientalizing work.

Eagles and dragons decorate the hem of the statue's gown. The gown is knotted at the shoulders. The figure is smiling. The statue's finger points out, as if to acknowledge the viewer. The statue in the Galleria Borghese is the most celebrated version of La Zingarella; however, there is another version of the statue by Nicolas Cordier in the Louvre. Visconti described the statue as Diana, detto volgarmente la Zingarella.

== See also ==
- Zinger
