= Eforia Spitalelor Civile =

Coordinates: 44°26′05″N 26°05′50″E

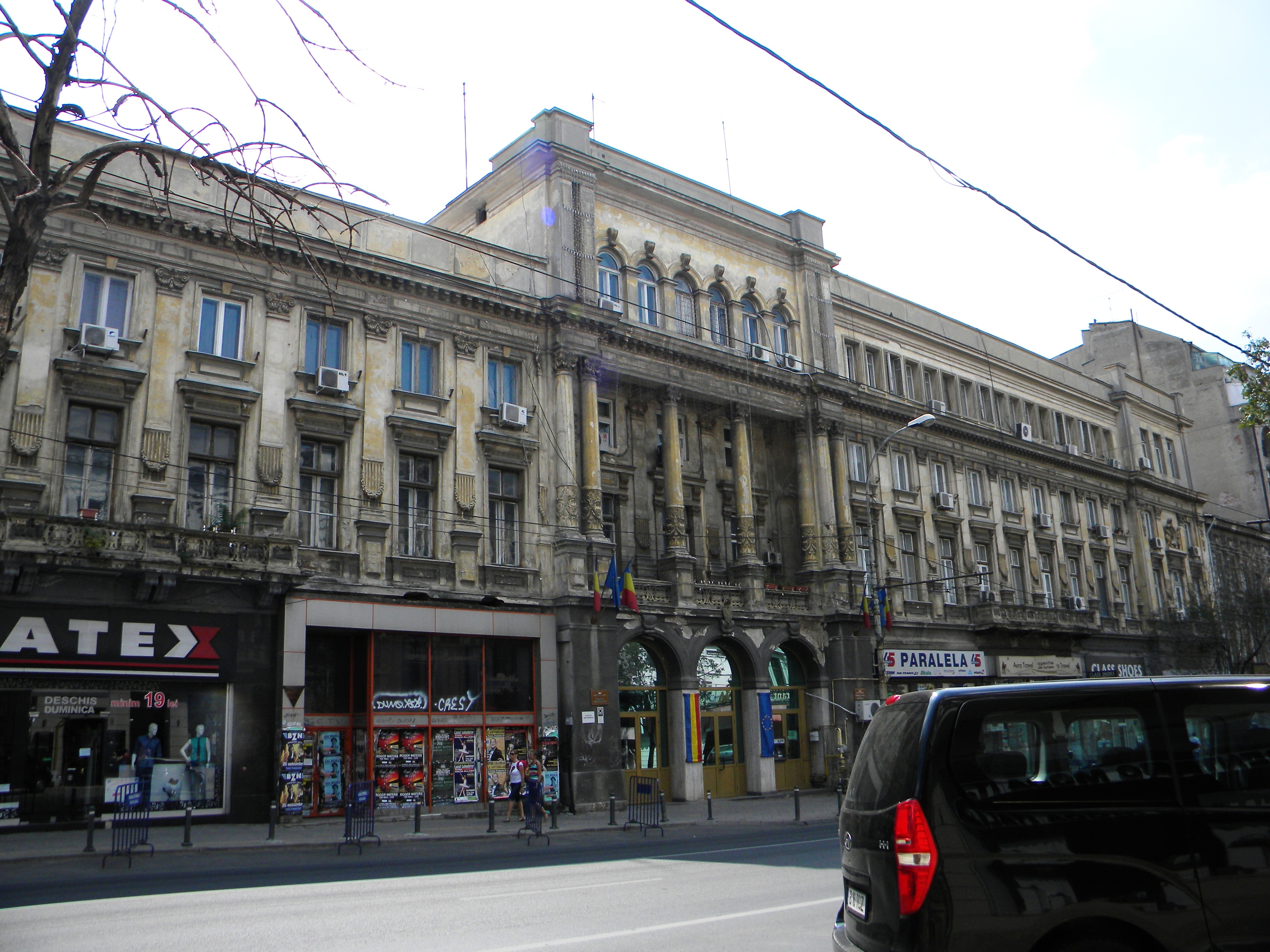
The Civil Hospital Ephoria Building, 2013

Eforia Spitalelor Civile (English: Board of Civil Hospitals) was a non-profit organization which managed hospitals in Wallachia and Moldavia. Created by general Pavel Kiselyov in 1832, the organization survived until 1948, when it was abolished by the communist authorities. Initially, by General Kiselyov's decree of April 2, 1832, the board had the authority of managing the Colțea, Pantelimon, and Filantropia hospitals in Bucharest. In the course of time, it created and managed other hospitals, mainly in Wallachia, but also in Moldavia.

The Board was reorganized on October 2, 1864, when new legislation required the board's budget to be submitted to parliament's approval and that the accounting be done according to government regulations and subject of the control of the Court of Accounts ("Curtea de conturi").

To finance the hospitals, the board had been endowed with land property, a significant part located in the territories of the former Turkish rayas. By 1921 it had a property of tens of thousands hectares of farm land and over 50,000 ha (120,000 acres) of forests. After the 1921 agrarian reform, the Board retained its right on the payments for oil extraction from its former properties. The board also owned several important buildings in Bucharest and several hotels in Sinaia.

== Building ==
The building where Eforia Civil Hospitals functioned was located on Elisabeth Boulevard in Bucharest and built between 1885 and 1886 in neoclassical style. During the 1944 bombing, the building lost its roof, being renovated and upgraded after the war.

Starting with 1950, the building hosted the People's Council of V.I. Lenin Raion. The superposing works were started, however they were completed only in the western wing. In the 1960s, the palace became the headquarters of the People's Council of the 5th Sector, and after the Romanian Revolution of 1989, the Bucharest 5th Sector City Hall. As a result of the continuous degradation of the building, in 2013 the headquarters of the city hall moved, the building being consolidated. In 2015, the City Hall of Bucharest submitted the project for consolidation, rehabilitation, extension and restoration of the façade, an investment with the cost of €17,735,470 and to be completed in 2 years. However, so far, this process has not begun.
