= La gitanilla (1924 film) =

1924 film

- Directed by: André Hugon
- Screenplay by: André Hugon
- Cinematography: Alphonse Gibory; Julien Ringel
- Release date: 18 April 1924
- Running time: 85 minutes
- Country: France
- Language: French

La gitanilla ("The little Gypsy girl") is a 1924 French drama film directed by André Hugon. It is based on the short story "La gitanilla", from the collection Novelas ejemplares by Miguel de Cervantes. The film was produced through Productions André Hugon. It was released in France on 18 April 1924 through Pathé Consortium Cinéma.

== Cast ==
- Ginette Maddie as la Gitanilla
- Jaime Devesa as Andrès Caballero
- Jeanne Bérangère as Dolorès
- José Durany as Antonio
- Léon Courtois as le chef
- Georges Deneubourg as l'Alcade
