= La Zingarella (Correggio) =

Painting by Antonio da Correggio

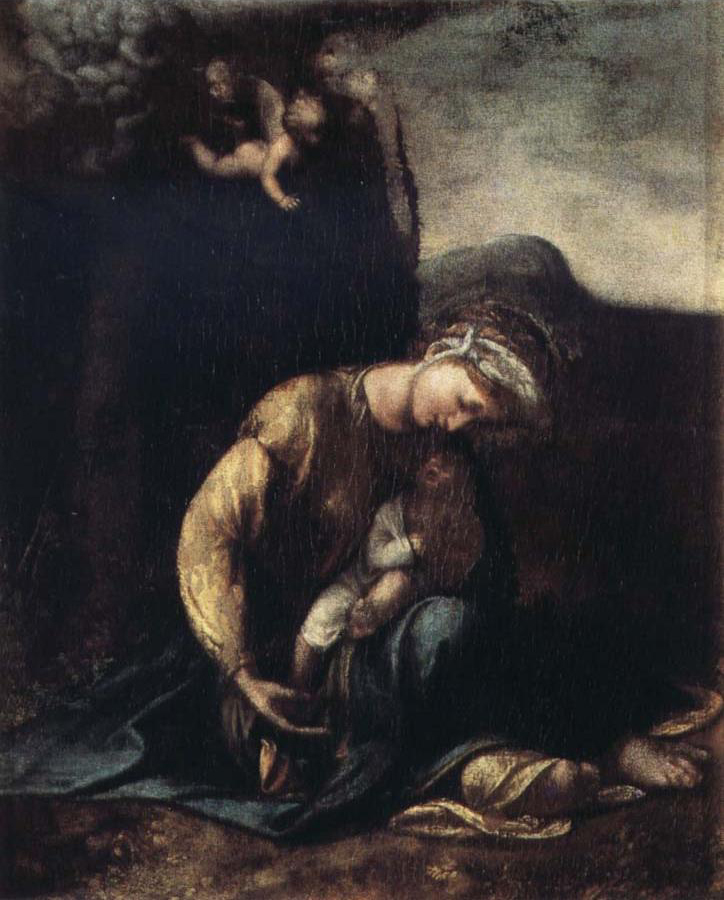

La Zingarella (literally The Little Gypsy Girl) is a 49 x 37 cm oil-on-panel painting executed ca. 1516–17 by the Italian Renaissance painter Correggio. It shows the Rest on the Flight into Egypt, although (as also seen in works around the same time by Dosso Dossi) it omits the figure of Saint Joseph. It is now in the Museo Nazionale di Capodimonte in Naples.

== History ==
It is recorded in the 1587 handwritten inventory of Ranuccio I Farnese's collection in Parma as "a portrait [sic] of the Madonna in gypsy costume by the hand of Correggio, in a walnut frame and with a green cendale curtain". The first printed reference to it is in the 1625 Musaeum by Federico Borromeo, archbishop of Milan: "Work by Correggio and also another painting, popularly known as 'la Zingara'. It was also copied by one of the Carracci brothers and we saw the original in Parma so damaged and ruined that we suspected it would soon disappear. The rest of the beauty of the work was undermined by the same artist by violating the laws of decorum, attributing to an Egyptian thief the figure of the Virgin". A 1935 restoration did further damage to the original.

However, Borromeo was still fascinated by the work and asked the duke of Parma's permission for Bartolomeo Schedoni to make a copy of it. That copy came to Milan after 1610 and inspired several Lombard artists such as Fede Galizia and Francesco Cairo. Other copies had also already been made in the 16th century, one of which can probably be identified with the work mentioned as being in Rome in the inventory of the collection of Girolamo Garimberto from Parma: "Another small painting of the Madonna dressed in gypsy costume, resting in a forest glade on the way into Egypt with her little son in her arms, very beautiful".

== Bibliography ==
- Giuseppe Adani, Correggio pittore universale, Silvana Editoriale, Correggio 2007. ISBN 9788836609772
