= Safta =

Safta or SAFTA may refer to:

== People ==
- Nicoleta Safta (born 1994), now Nicoleta Balog, Romanian handballer
- Safta Brâncoveanu (1776–1857), Romanian noblewoman and philanthropist
- Safta Castrișoaia (died 1862), Romanian merchant
- Safta Jaffery (1958–2017), British music producer

== Acronyms ==
- Scientifically Aggressive Fighting Technology of America, a martial art created by American fighter Jon Hess
- South African Film and Television Awards
- South Asian Free Trade Area
