= Bob Church, Cluj-Napoca =

Church in Cluj-Napoca, Romania

Bob Church
- Biserica Bob
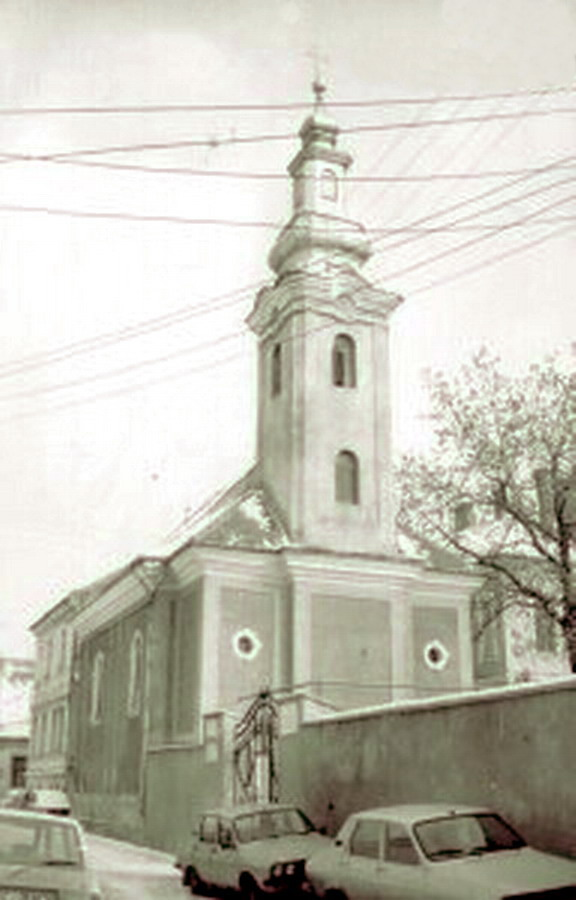
- Cluj-Napoca Bob Church

Religion
- Affiliation: Romanian Greek-Catholic
- District: Eparchy of Cluj-Gherla
- Ecclesiastical or organizational status: Church
- Year consecrated: 1803

Location
- Location: Cluj-Napoca, Romania
- Interactive map of Bob Church
- Coordinates: 46°46′07″N 23°35′15″E

Architecture
- Architect: Iosif Leder
- Style: Baroque
- Completed: 1803

The Bob church (Romanian: Biserica Bob din Cluj, Hungarian: Bob utcai görög katolikus templom) is the first Greek-Catholic church that was built in 1803 in the city of Cluj, Transylvania, at that time part of the Austrian Empire. The name of the church comes from the Romanian noble Ioan Bob, later bishop of the Romanian Greek-Catholic church, who paid for the construction of the church.

On 7 August 1864, Veronica Micle married here Ștefan Micle, the future Rector of the University of Iași.

== Bibliography ==
- Dăianu, Elie (1906). Biserica lui Bob în Cluj. Cluj.

== Gallery ==
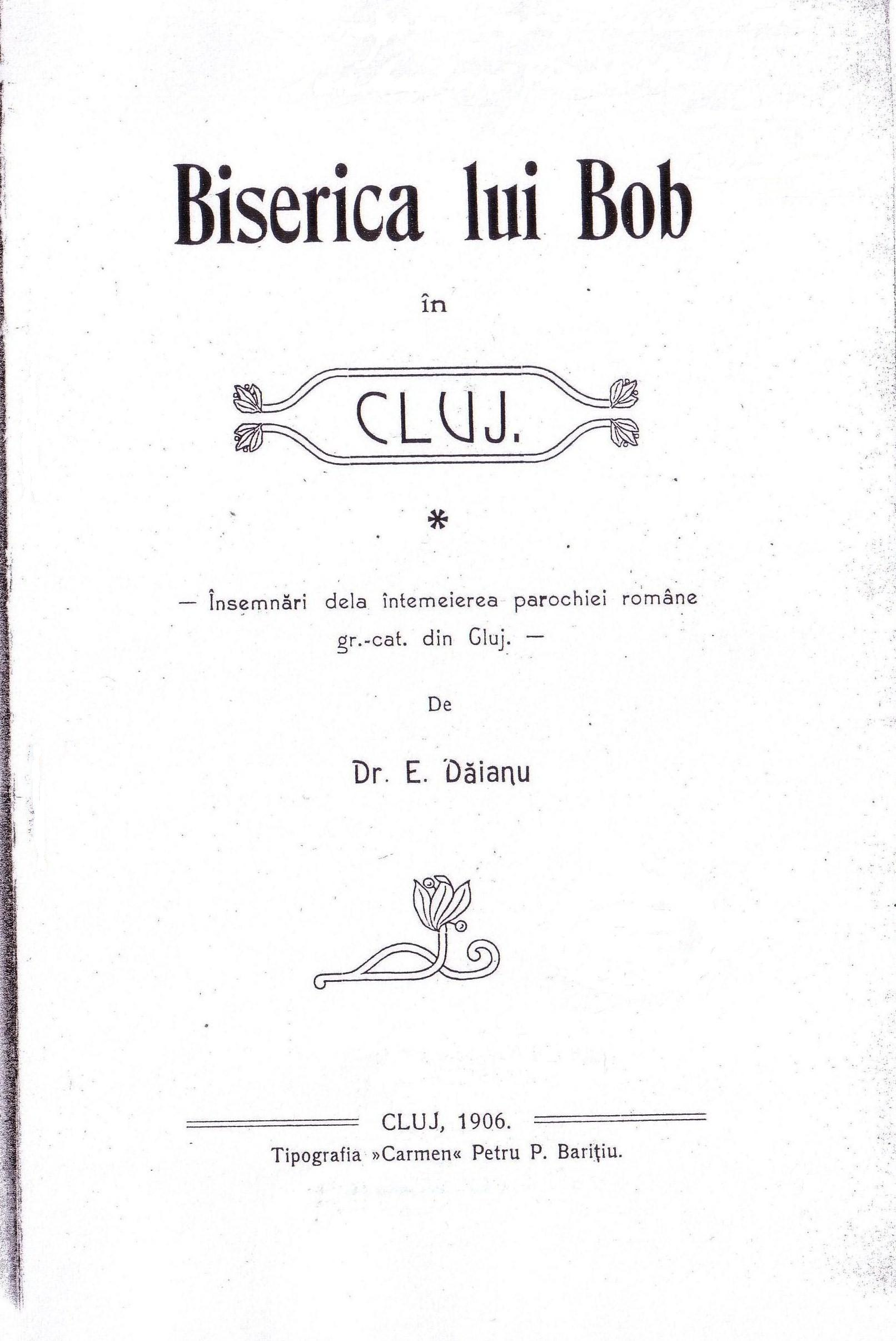
