= Veronica Micle =

Romanian poet and writer (1850–1889)

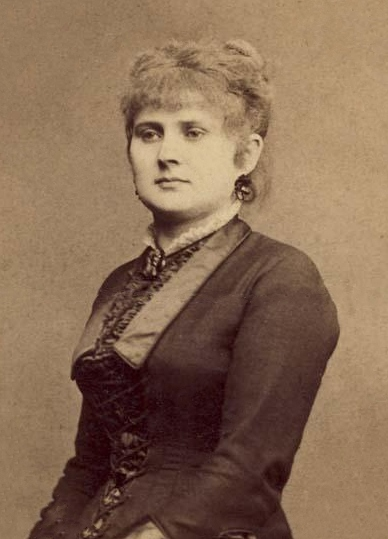
- Veronica Micle
- Born: Ana Câmpeanu; April 22, 1850; Naszód, Kingdom of Hungary
- Died: August 3, 1889 (aged 39); Agapia, Kingdom of Romania
- Resting place: Văratec Monastery
- Education: Iași Central School for Girls
- Occupations: Poet, writer
- Spouse: Ștefan Micle (m. 1864)
- Partner: Mihai Eminescu
- Children: Virginia and Valeria
- Writing career
- Language: Romanian
- Years active: 1872–1889
- Genre: Poetry
- Literary movement: Romanticism

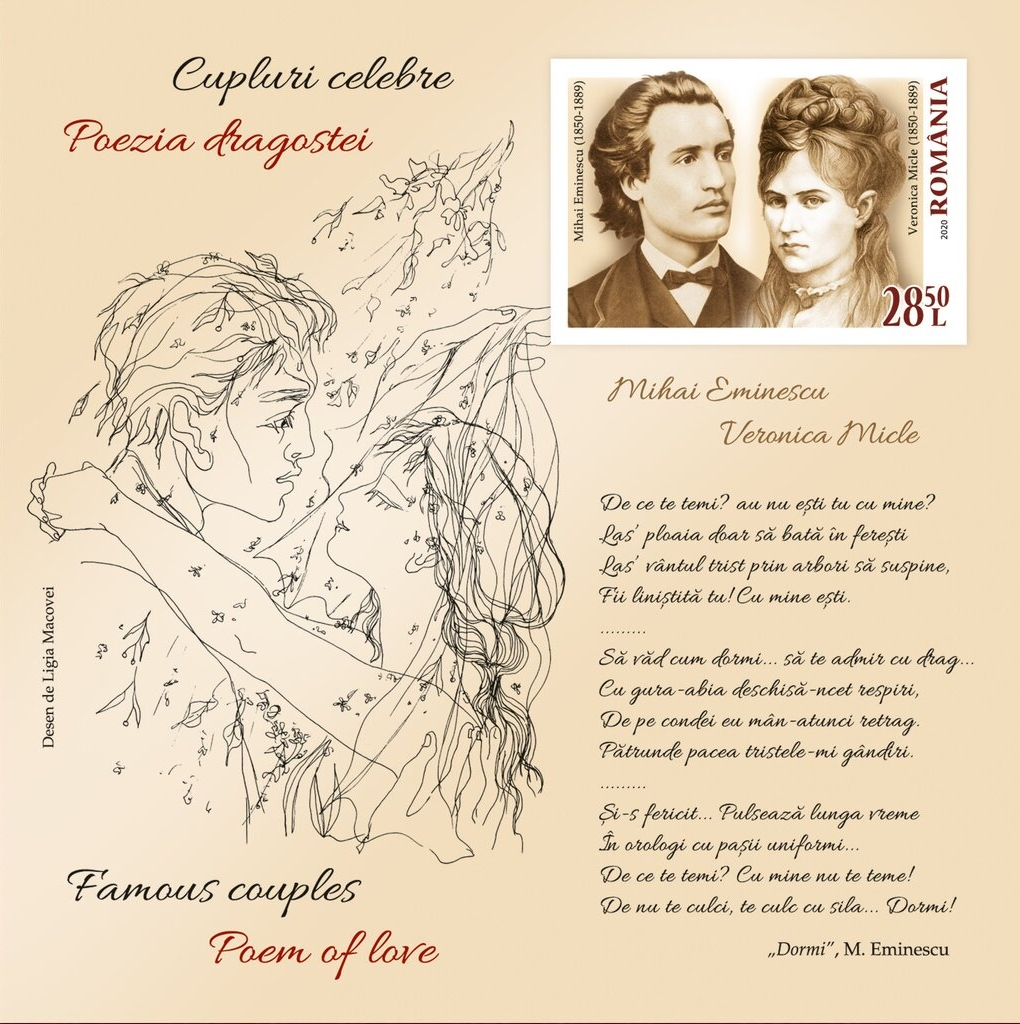
A 2020 Romanian stamp sheet depicting Micle, Eminescu and his 1876 poem Dormi! inspired by Micle

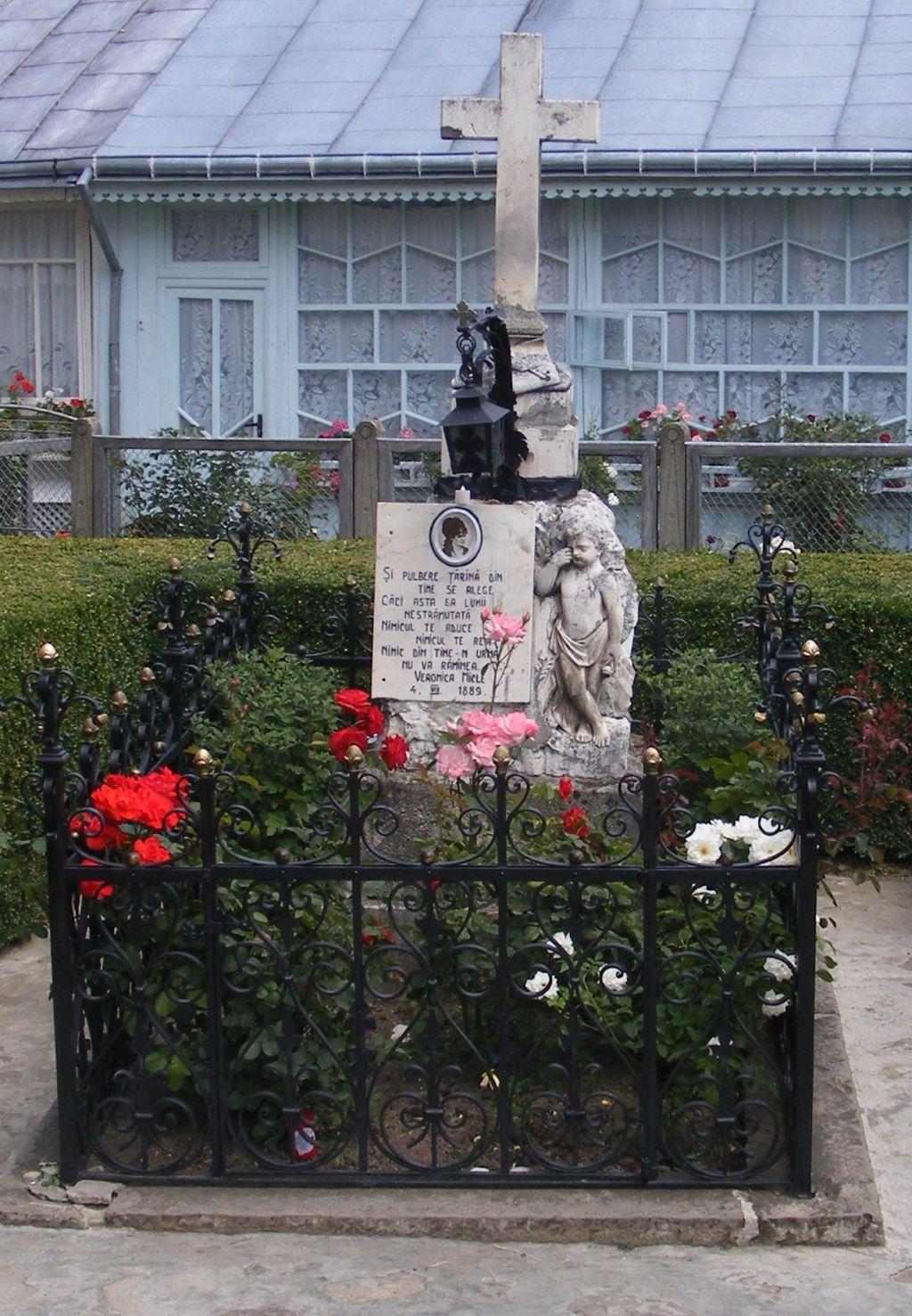
Grave of Micle at Văratec Monastery

Veronica Micle (born Ana Câmpeanu; 22 April 1850 – 3 August 1889) was an Austrian Empire-born Romanian poet, whose work was influenced by Romanticism. She is best known for her love affair with the poet Mihai Eminescu, one of the most important Romanian writers.

== Biography ==
Born in Naszód, Kingdom of Hungary (now Năsăud, Bistrița-Năsăud County, Romania), Micle was the second child of the shoemaker Ilie Câmpeanu and his wife Ana. She was born to him posthumously: Ilie died in 1849, taking two bullets to the chest while fighting under Avram Iancu against the Hungarian revolutionaries. Her mother went to Moldavia, settling in Târgu Neamț in 1850, then to Roman, and finally in Iași in 1853.

Ana went to primary school (during which time she began using the name Veronica) and to the Iași Central School for Girls, which she graduated in June 1863. Her graduation exam proctor was the Rector of the University of Iași, Professor Ștefan Micle. They fell in love and on 7 August 1864, at Bob Church, in Cluj (at the time, Kolozsvár), she married Micle, thirty years her senior. She had two daughters: Virginia, a poet who married Eduard Gruber, and Valeria, an opera singer who used the name Hilda professionally.

In March 1872, in Vienna, she met Eminescu, beginning a relationship that would last for the rest of their lives. At first he would visit the literary salon that she hosted. Their friendship had become love sometime between 1875, when they started dedicating poems to each other, and 1878 (sources vary). Their romance went through several ups and downs—for instance, Eminescu left for Bucharest in 1877 to edit Timpul and that year Micle published poems in which she expressed her sadness at being left behind. Her husband died in 1879, leaving her rather poor. She came to Bucharest to seek a pension and Eminescu publicly called her his fiancée, but further stresses intervened (including a stillborn child in May 1880) and while he took up the subject again in 1881, he was diagnosed with syphilis in 1883.

In 1887, she moved to Bucharest in an effort to keep up Eminescu's spirits. After his death in June 1889, she retired to Văratec Monastery, where she put together a volume called Dragoste și Poezie (Love and Poetry), in which she included poems of her own and those of Eminescu dedicated to her, to which she added commentary. A shaken Micle took arsenic two months after Eminescu's death. She is buried on the monastery grounds, in Văratec village. Her house in Târgu Neamț, given to her by her parents as a wedding dowry and which she donated to the monastery in 1886, is now a museum.

Three bronze sculptures of Micle exist. The first, in Copou Park in Iași, was unveiled in 1943, the work of Ion Irimescu. The second stands beside her memorial house in Târgu Neamț, designed by Damian Popa in 1998. The third, by Veaceslav Jiglițchi, was unveiled in Chișinău in 2021.

== Literary activity ==
Micle made her publishing debut in Noul Curier Român (NCR) in 1872, with two romantic sketches published under the pen-name Corina. She published her poems, influenced by Eminescu, in Columna Lui Traian in 1874 and in Convorbiri Literare the following year. She also contributed to Familia (from 1879), Revista Nouă and Revista Literară.

Additionally, a volume containing 93 of Eminescu's letters to Micle and 15 of her replies was published in 2000.

== Works ==
- Rendez-vous, NCR, I, 1872
- Plimbarea de mai în Iași, NCR, I, 1872
- Poezii, Bucharest, Halman, 1887
- Poezii, Prof. I. S. Mugur, Iași, Șaraga, 1909
- Dragoste și Poezie, Bucharest, Socec, Prof. Octav Minar.
- Translations from Lamartine and Gautier, in Poesii, Bucharest, Halman.
