= Agapia Monastery =

Romanian Orthodox monastery in Târgu Neamț, Romania

Coordinates: 47°10′14″N 26°14′08″E

- Mănăstirea Agapia
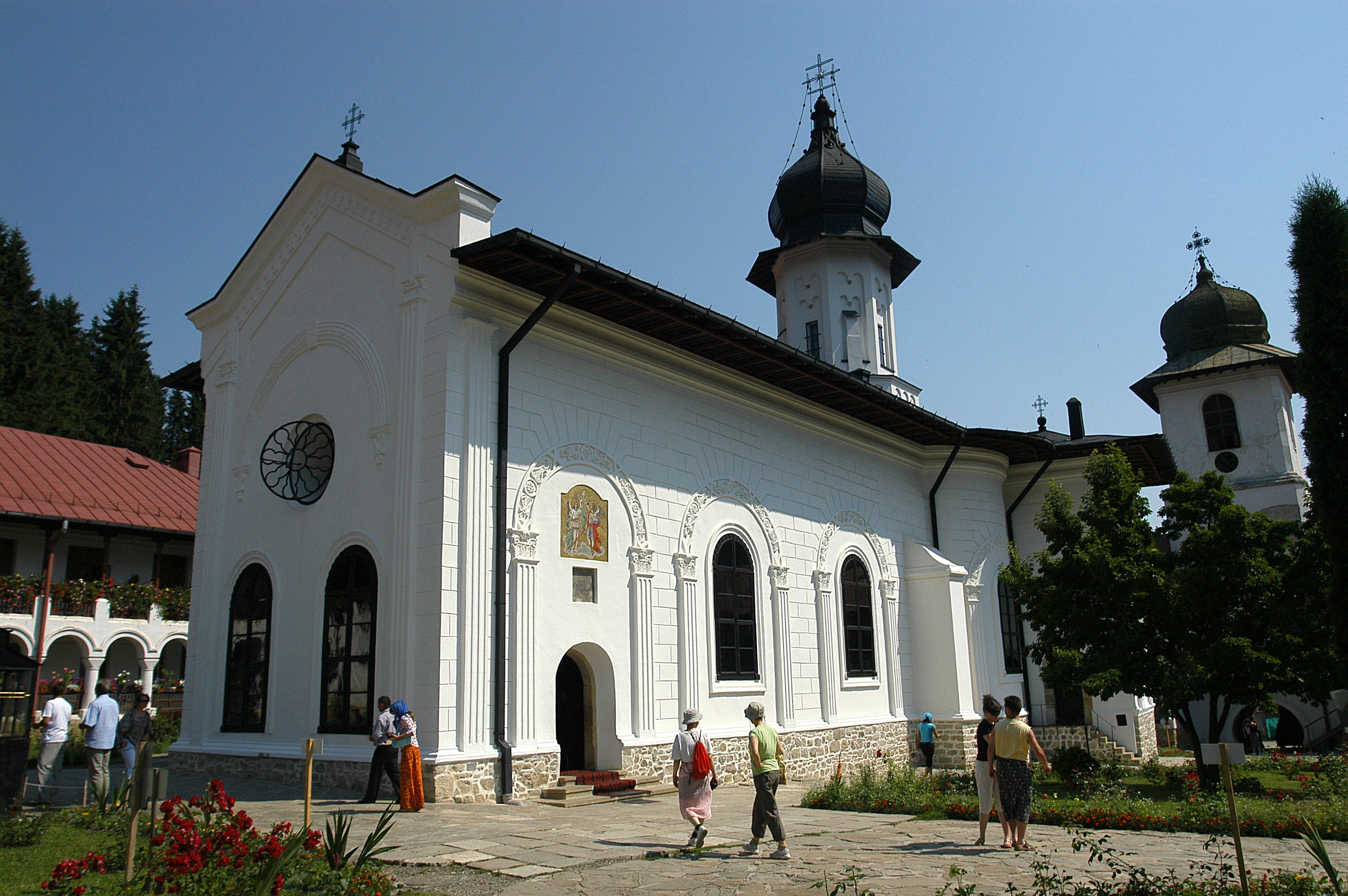
- Sf. Voievozi Church

Religion
- Affiliation: Eastern Orthodox
- Ecclesiastical or organisational status: Nunnery
- Patron: Holy Archangels Michael and Gabriel
- Year consecrated: 1646
- Status: Active

Location
- Location: Agapia, Neamț County, Romania
- Interactive map of Agapia Monastery

Architecture
- Architect: Enache Ctisi
- Style: Neoclassic
- Founder: Gavriil Coci
- Groundbreaking: 1641
- Completed: 1643
- Materials: Stone, granite (bell tower); Stone, brick (Sf. Voievozi Church)

The Agapia Monastery (Romanian: Mănăstirea Agapia) is a Romanian Orthodox nunnery located 9 km west of Târgu Neamț, in the commune of Agapia, Neamț County. It was built between 1641 and 1643 by Romanian hetman Gavriil Coci, brother of Vasile Lupu. The church was painted by Nicolae Grigorescu between 1858 and 1861. It is one of the largest nunneries in Romania, having 300–400 nuns and ranking second place in population after Văratec Monastery.
