= Feleacu =

Feleacu Erdőfelek
- Commune
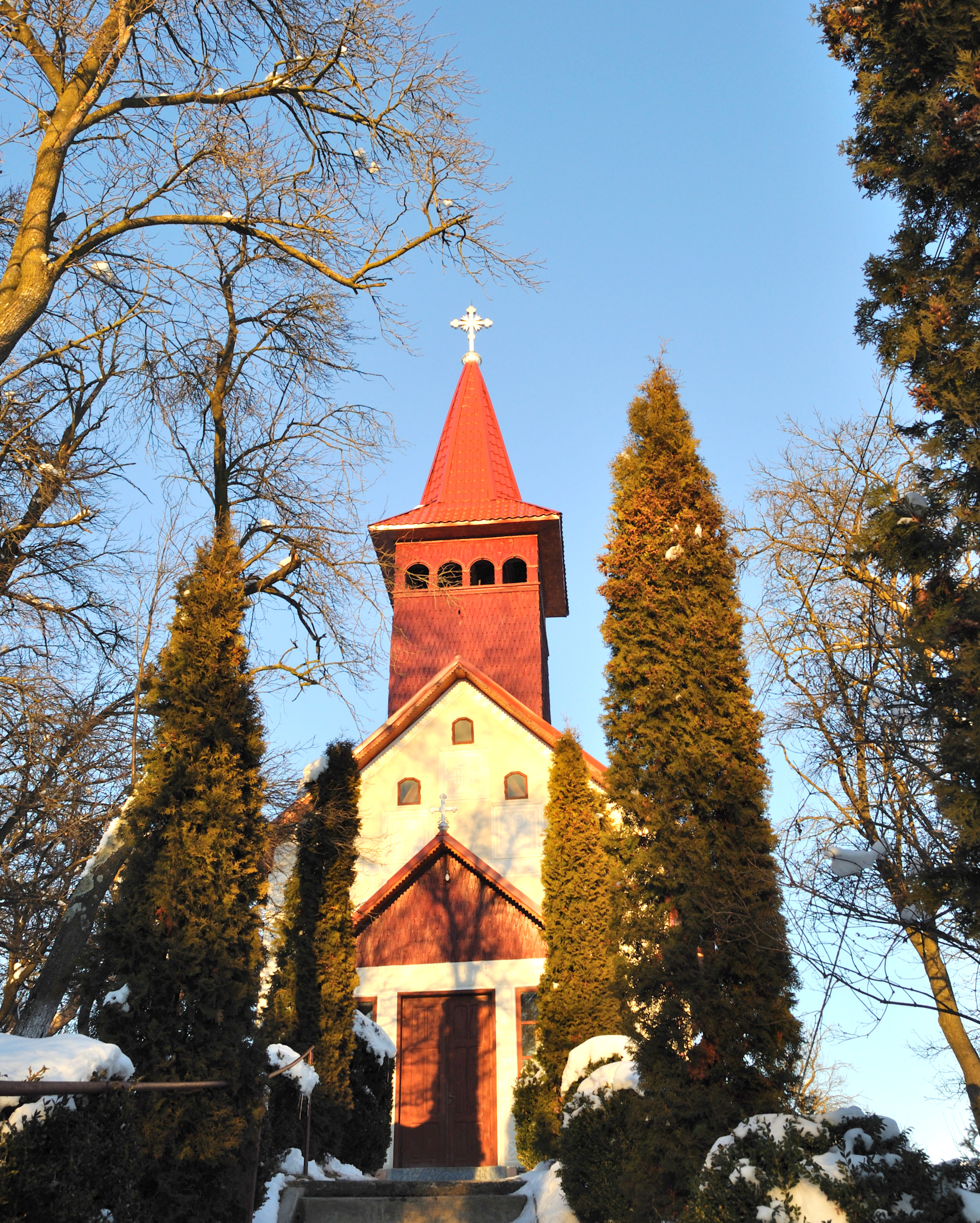
- Orthodox church in Vâlcele

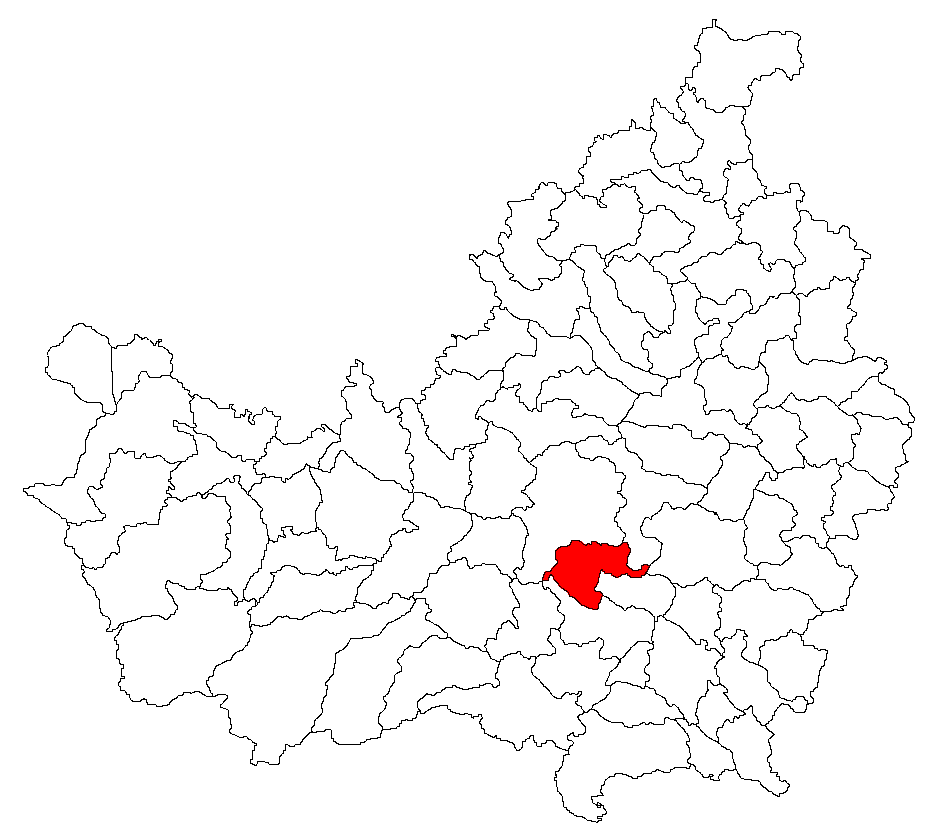
- Location in Cluj County

- Location in Romania
- Coordinates: 46°42′58″N 23°37′06″E
- Country: Romania
- County: Cluj
- Established: 1366
- Subdivisions: Feleacu, Gheorghieni, Vâlcele, Sărădiș, Casele Micești

Government
  - Mayor (2020–2024): Gabriel Victor Costea (PNL)
- Area: 61.7 km^{2} (23.8 sq mi)
- Elevation: 711 m (2,333 ft)
- Population (2021-12-01): 5,693
  - Density: 92.3/km^{2} (239/sq mi)
- Time zone: UTC+02:00 (EET)
  - Summer (DST): UTC+03:00 (EEST)
- Postal code: 407270
- Area code: +40 x64
- Vehicle reg.: CJ
- Website: www.comunafeleacu.ro

Feleacu (Hungarian: Erdőfelek; German: Fleck) is a commune in Cluj County, Transylvania, Romania. It is composed of five villages: Casele Micești (Kaszoly), Feleacu, Gheorghieni (Györgyfalva), Sărădiș (Seregélyes), and Vâlcele (Bányabükk).

== Demographics ==
At the 2021 census, Feleacu had a population of 5,693, an increase from the 2011 census, when the commune had a population of 3,923. Across time, the commune's population has evolved as follows:

Census		Ethnic Composition
Year	Population	Romanians	Hungarians	Germans	Roma	Other
1850	2,049	934	976	3	126	10
1880	2,312	943	1,158	5		206
1890	4,423	2,873	1,432	5		113
1900	4,874	3,291	1,583			0
1910	5,604	3,632	1,958	1		13
1920	5,397	3,723	1,674			0
1930	5,661	3,917	1,742	1		1
1941	5,699	4,104	1,571	3		21
1956	5,787	4,192	1,581		14	0
1966	5,549	4,060	1,485	1		3
1977	5,883	4,363	1,516		4	0
1992	4,116	2,971	1,137		8	0
2002	3,810	2,798	974		34	0
2011	3,923	2,833	894		99
2021	5,693	4,132	1,099		53	404

== Natives ==
- Corneliu Gârbea (1928–2018), actor
- Ștefan Micle (1820–1879), physicist and chemist

== Infrastructure ==
- Guyed TV mast for FM-/TV-broadcasting (height: 180 metres (590 ft)) and some lattice towers with directional antennas at 46°42'52"N 23°38'32"E.

== Notes ==
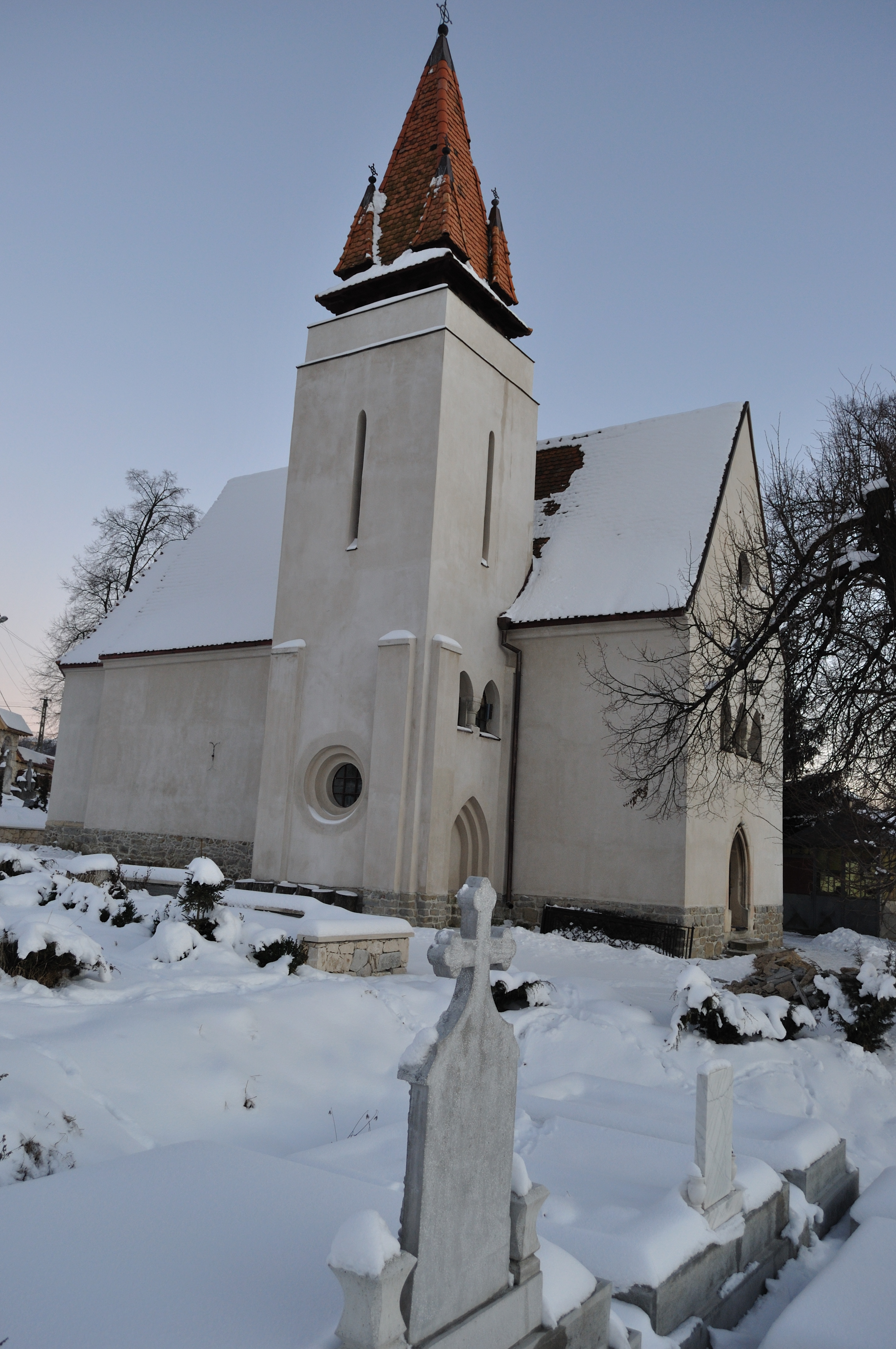
Archdiocesan church of Feleacu

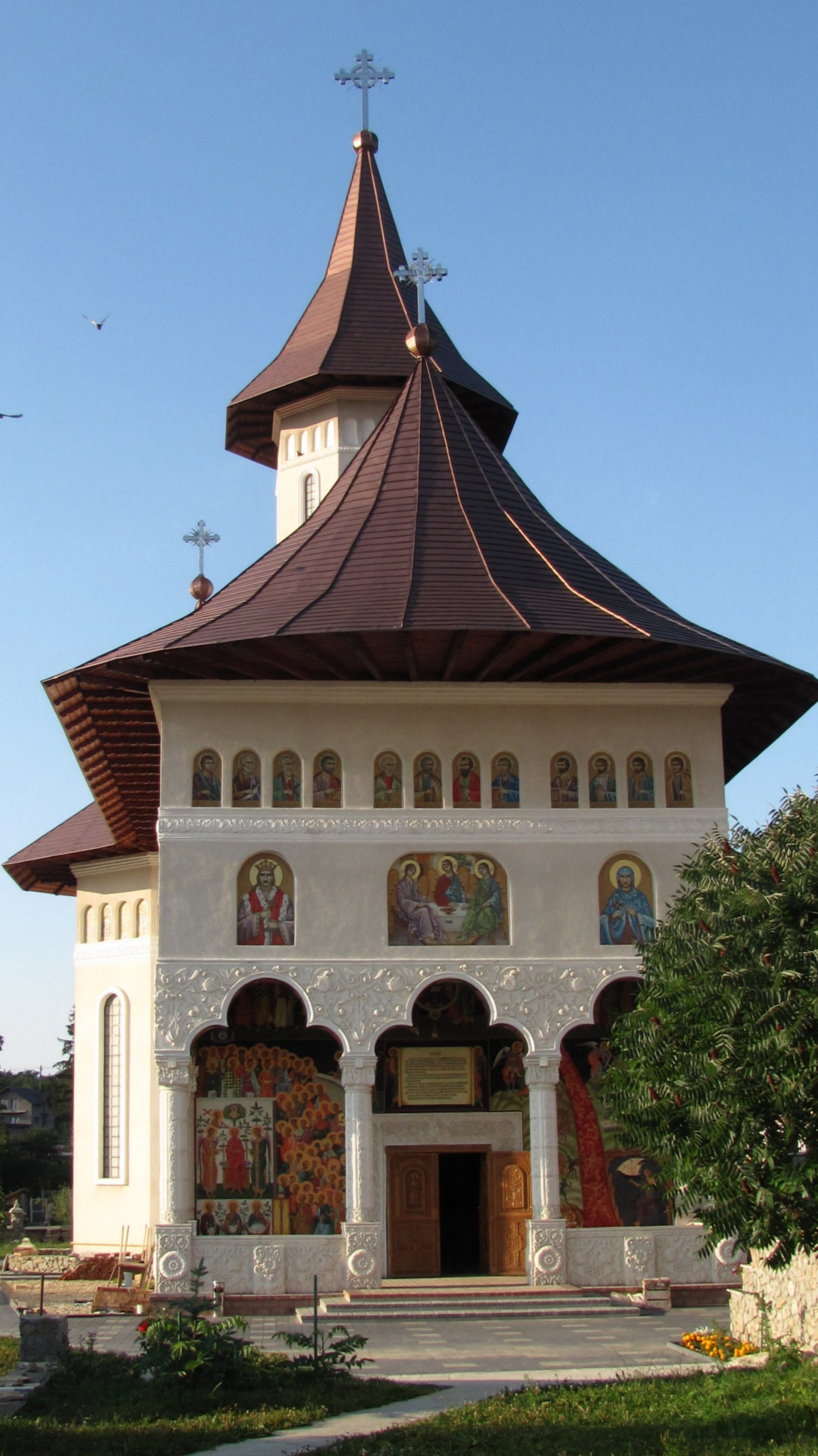
Monastery of the Holy Trinity in Feleacu

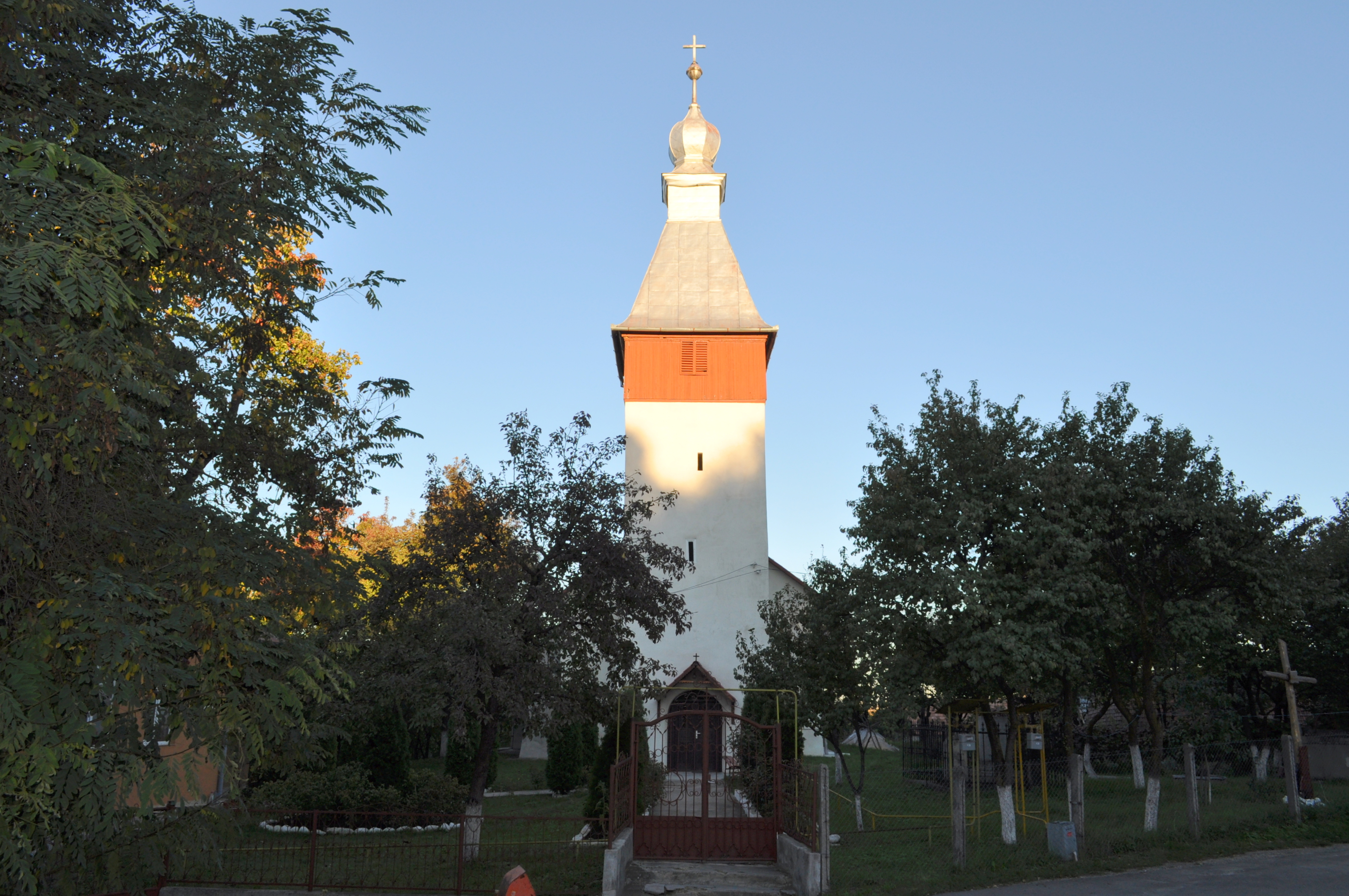
Roman-Catholic church in Gheorghieni
