= Constanța Marino-Moscu =

Romanian short story writer (1875–1940)

Constanța Marino-Moscu (17 April 1875–20 September 1940) was a Romanian short story writer.

Born in Agapia, Neamț County, her father was the farmer Panait Marino and his wife Ana (née Popovici). After attending primary school in Pașcani and high school level classes at the Dodun de Perires boarding school in Iași, she studied piano in Paris, Vienna and Berlin. She married Gheorghe Moscu, a magistrate. Her published debut was the short story "Natalița", which appeared in Viața Românească in 1908. Her first book was the short story collection Ada Lazu (1911). Magazines that published her work include Viața Românească, Sburătorul, Adevărul literar și artistic and Lectura pentru toți. She wrote two other story collections (Tulburarea, 1923; Făclii în noapte, 1930), and memoir essays in Viața Românească ("Amintirile Caterinei State") and Adevărul literar și artistic ("Din zilele şi gândurile mele").
