= Văratec Monastery =

Romanian Orthodox women's monastery

- Mănăstirea Văratec
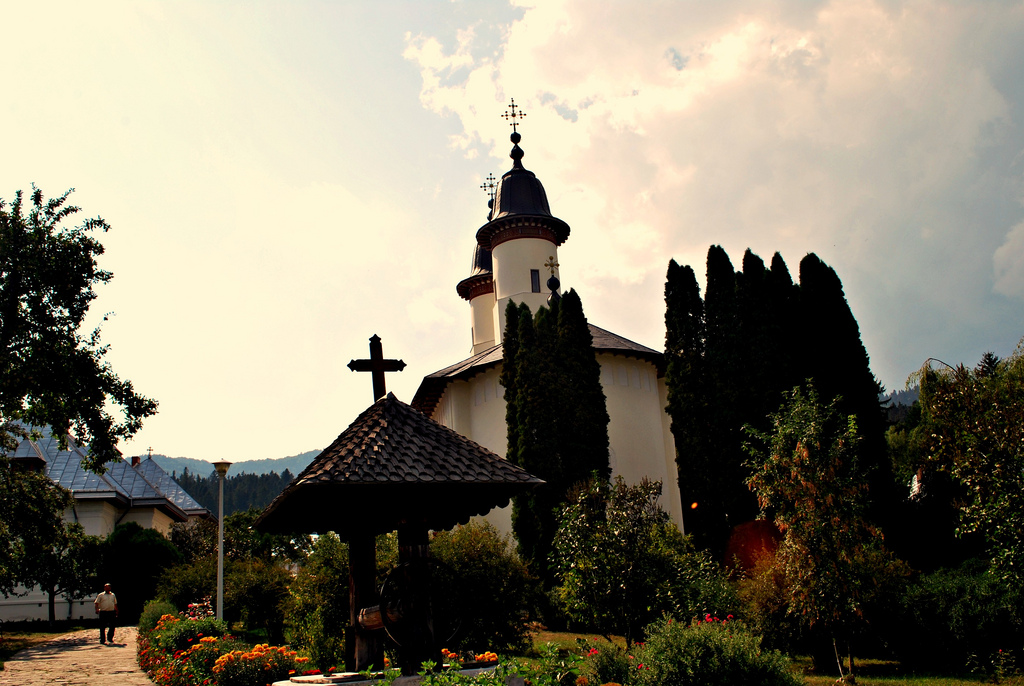

Religion
- Affiliation: Romanian Orthodox
- Ecclesiastical or organisational status: Nunnery
- Patron: Dormition of the Theotokos
- Status: Active

Location
- Location: Văratec, Neamț County, Romania
- Interactive map of Văratec Monastery
- Coordinates: 47°8′23″N 26°16′6″E

Architecture
- Founder: Olimpiada
- Groundbreaking: 1781
- Completed: 1785
- Materials: River stone, brick

Văratec Monastery is a Romanian Orthodox women's monastery located in north-eastern part of the country, in Văratec village, Agapia Commune, Neamț County. It is situated at 12 km from Târgu Neamț and 40 km from Piatra Neamț. It is the largest community of nuns in Romania, with more than 400 nuns living there.

The monastery was founded in 1785 by Schema nun Olimpiada, with her confessor, Father Iosif. In this work, mother Olimpiada was guided by Father Paisius Velichkovsky, hegumen of Neamț Monastery. The monastery was set under the guidance of Agapia Monastery, which was close by, and afterwards the Monastery became an independent monastery in 1839.

Massive stone walls enclose the main church, "The Dormition of the Virgin Mary", the abbot's building and the administrative buildings (on the northern side of the enclosure) and the monastery's Museum, where the "Queen Mary" workshop used to be (in the building on the south side). The monastic precinct is surrounded by the monastery village, made up of rural traditional houses, where the nuns live, and which lie along narrow alleys.

The assembly of Văratec Monastery was included on the historical monuments list from Neamț county in 2004, with the classification code NT-II-a-B-10732 and it consists of 5 objectives:

- The Main Church, "The Dormition of the Virgin Mary" – dating from the beginning of the 19th century, with the code NT-II-m-A-10732.01
- The Gate Bell Tower – dating from the 19th century, with the code NT-II-m-A-10732.02
- The "Saint John the Baptist" church – dating from 1844, with improvements around 1880, with the code NT-II-m-A-10732.03
- The "Transfiguration" church – dating from 1847, with the code NT-II-m-A-10732.04
- The cells – dating from the 19th and 20th centuries, with the code NT-II-m-A-10732.05
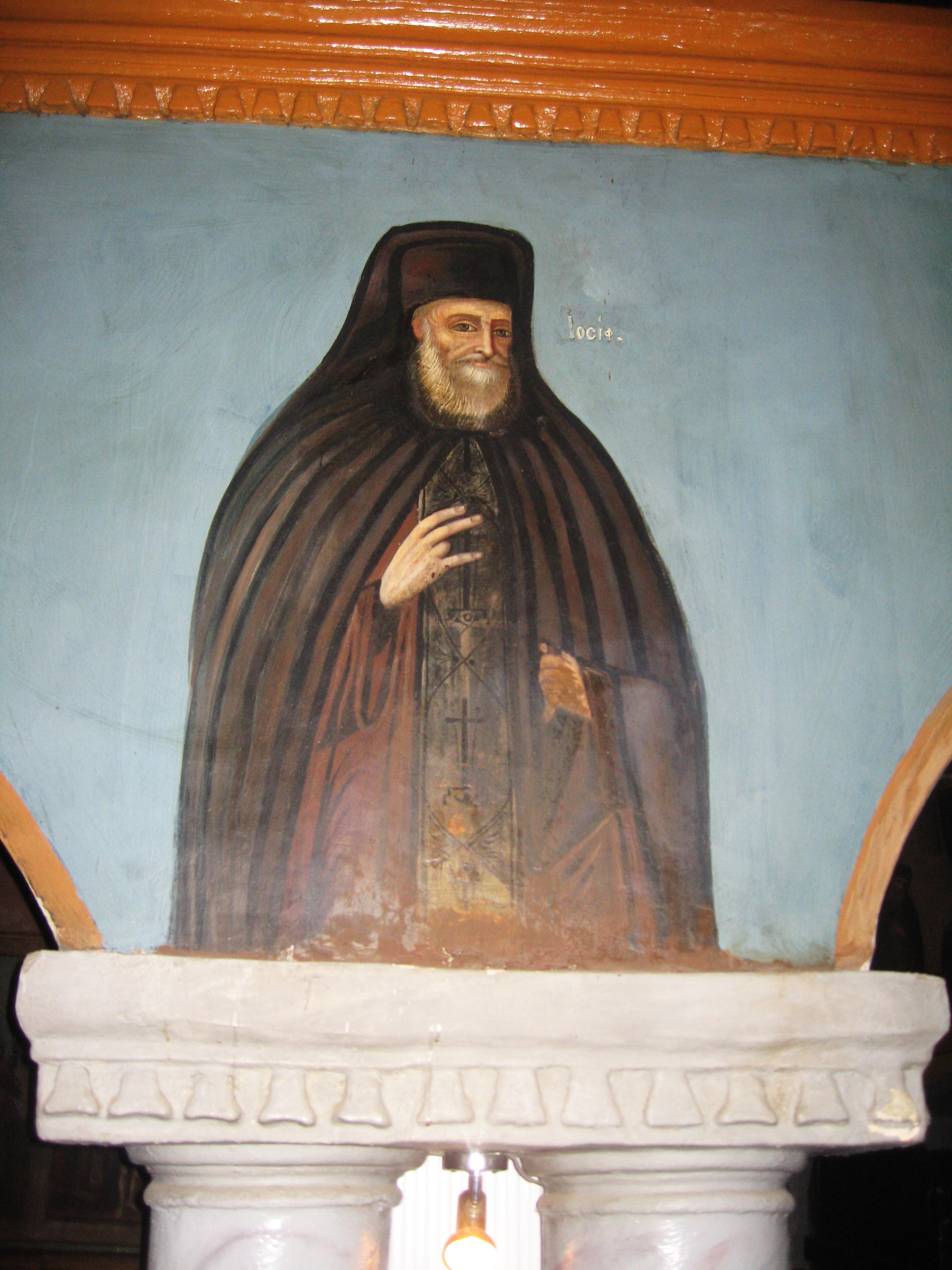
  Saint Iosif

== Monastery history ==
=== Founding ===
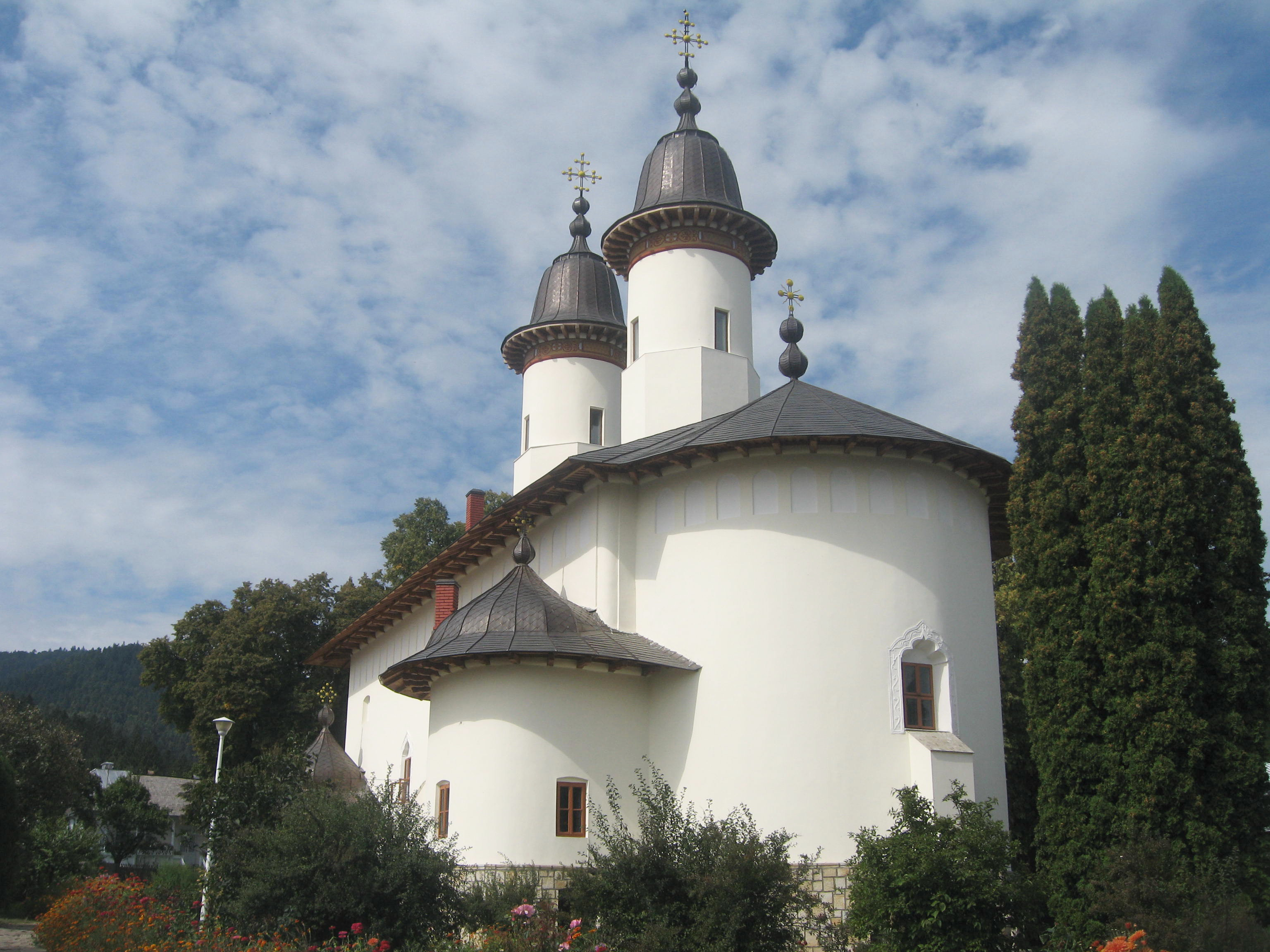
The church Dormition of the Virgin Mary, consecrated in 1812

The founding of the Văratec Monastery is connected with the name of Bălașa Herescu (1757–1842), Father Mihail's daughter, from the Saint Nicolae Domnesc Church in Iași. She lived as rassophore in the Toplița Skete nearby, by the name Sister Olimpiada. She had received some lands from the treasurer Deleanu and from the forester Ion Bălănoiu.

Mother Olimpiada was advised by Father Paisius Velichkovsky, hegumen at Neamț Monastery, who wanted to dissolve the small women's sketes situated near cities and villages to concentrate the nuns in a few larger monasteries isolated from the world. To that end, between 1781 and 1785 Mother Olimpiada established a small hermitage in a clearing in Văratec. In June 1785, Olimpiada, together with her confessor Father Iosif, began building a wooden church with the title "The Dormition of Virgin Mary". Near the church they built cells, in which many nuns came to live, thus founding Văratec Skete.

Together with Mother Olimpiada, Father Iosif is also considered a founder of the monastery. He was born around 1750, in the village Valea Jidanului in Transylvania, and entered the monastic life at an early age, becoming a novice of the renowned monk Father Paisius Velichkovsky, while the latter still resided at Dragomirna Monastery. Father Iosif died on 28 December 1828, and is buried in the narthex of the main church of the Monastery, "The Dormition of the Virgin Mary." He was sanctified as a Saint in 2005, and he is celebrated on 16 August.

In 1787, the Văratec Skete was unified with Toplița Skete to form a larger and better organized monastic settlement. Toplița Skete, founded more than 250 years earlier, was based in the middle of the village of Topolița. Upon uniting these two sketes, the nuns moved from Topolița to Văratec. In the following year the nuns from Durău Skete also came, with their superior Mother Nazaria, who was appointed Superior Mother of Văratec Skete. Schema nun Nazaria led the monastery between 1788 and 1814, with the help of Father Iosif.

=== Monastery development ===
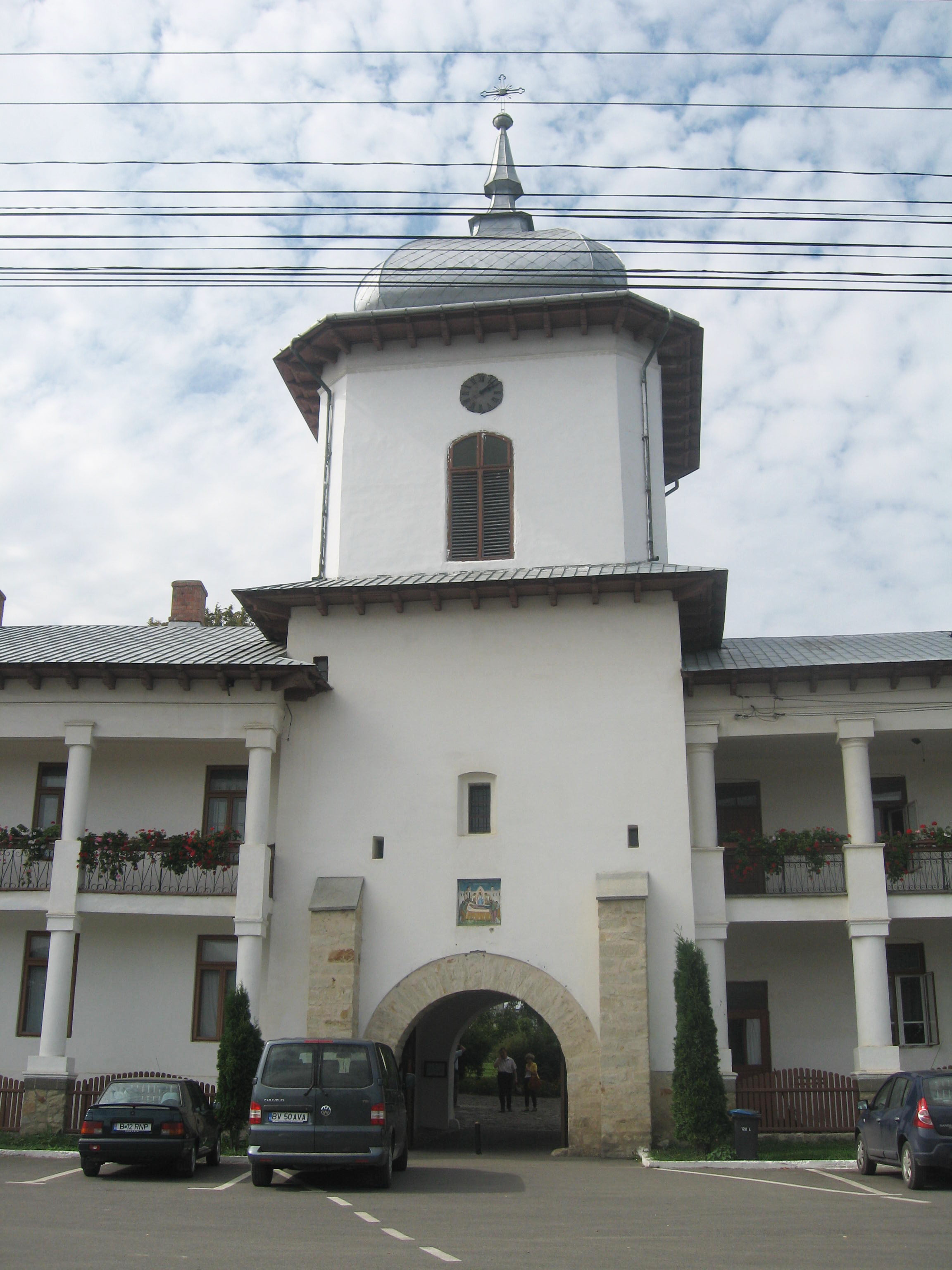
The Bell Tower

In 1803, Metropolitan Veniamin Costachi of Moldavia wanted to establish a seminary for priests at Socola Monastery in Iași, so he decided that the 50 nuns from Socola were to be moved to Agapia Monastery, which thus became a women's monastery. By the Metropolitan's decision, on 10 July 1803, signed by the boyars from the royal court, Văratec Skete was then for a short while united with Agapia Monastery.

By another decree of the Metropolitan, on 23 September 1803, a monastic craft and general knowledge school was established in the two monasteries, where nuns could learn liturgical music, Greek language, as well as embroidery and weaving. The Metropolitan also moved nuns from three other sketes: Prapa Doamna in Iași, Gârcina and Vânătorii Pietrii from Neamț County. The number of nuns in Văratec grew considerably with these additions, By 26 September 1811, Văratec had 273 nuns, out of which 197 nuns and 76 novice sisters. These were separated according to their social origin: 33 boyar daughters, 59 merchant daughters, 105 peasant daughters, 23 daughters of dignitaries which lost their functions, 51 clergy daughters, a teacher daughter, a shepherd daughter and a different religion woman.

Due to the growing number of nuns, the wooden church became too small. So, in 1808, Superior Mother Nazaria (1788–1814) began the constructions of a stone church, which was finalized and consecrated in 1812. The church was painted in 1841, and reconsecrated by Metropolitan Veniamin Costachi, with an added inscription.

During the Wallachian uprising of 1821, the skete was besieged and robbed by Ottomans: various goods were stolen and the nuns were cast out or killed; Mother Olimpiada took refuge in Secu Monastery.

New structures were added in the first half of the 19th century: the enclosure walls, a stone refectory, some cells and the bell tower, on three levels, situated towards east, where "Saint Nicholas" Chapel was made, at a certain moment between 1840 and 1850. Mother Olimpiada, the founder of the settlement, had an important role in the development of the monastic collectivity in Văratec, devoting all her worldly fortune to this purpose. Many boyar wives also donated land to this monastic settlement:

- Elencu Paladi gave three domains, and the necessary money to make the iconostasis for the main church, "Dormition of the Virgin Mary", in 1816.
- Mother Elisabeta Balș (+1833), born as Zoe Rosetti and married to boyar Teodor Balș (1743–1810). She withdraw in 1832, with her daughter, Safta Brâncoveanu, in Văratec Monastery. She donated the Vulturești domain to the monastery. She died around 1833 and is buried in Văratec.
- Mother Safta Brâncoveanu (1778 – August 1857), daughter of Teodor Balș and Zoe Rosetti-Balș (Mother Elisabeta Balș), was married in 1793 to Grigore Brâncoveanu, lord of Craiova, but had no children. She withdraw with her mother, in 1832, after the death of her husband, to Văratec Monastery. Being a royal daughter, with a large fortune, she made numerous donations to different churches and monasteries, hospitals, etc. She donated the domains Osica and Vlăduleni to Văratec Monastery, clerical vestments, coverings with golden filaments, religious books, etc. She melted her personal silver objects and made bindings for the Gospel, coverings for icons, candles, holy vessels, cross bases for the altar with them. She died on 8 August 1857 and was buried in Văratec, next to her mother's grave.

In 1839, Văratec Monastery separated from Agapia Monastery and became independent. The Superior Mothers of this period were Nazaria (1788–1814), Magdalena (1815–1822) and Olimpiada (1822–1828 and 1834–1842).

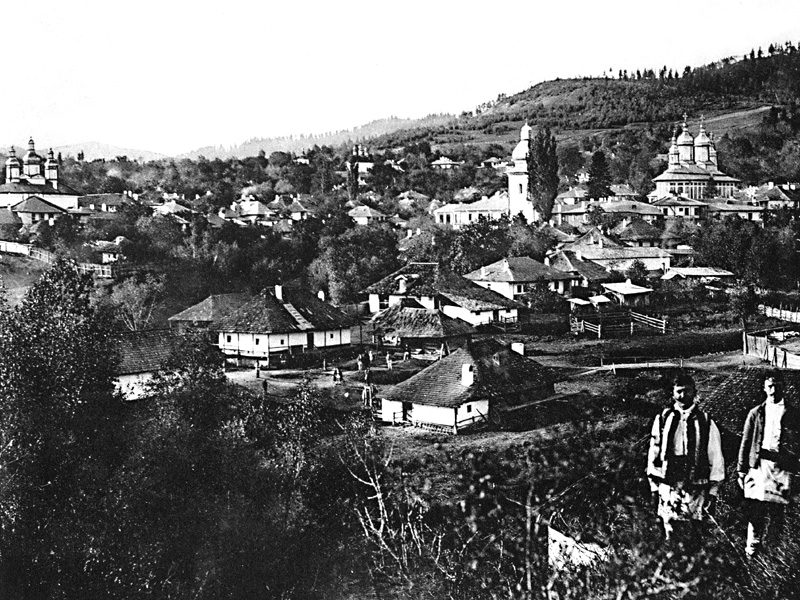
Văratec Monastery – vintage photo from the time 1901–1904. It was made by Alexandru Antoniu (1860–1925) and published in "General Romania album: made of 300 images representing historical and contemporary monuments, picturesque positions, Crown Domains and national costumes with picturesque and historical description" (Dresden, C. G. Röder, 1901–1904).

During the leadership of Mother Eufrosina Lazu (1844–1887), Mother Olimpiada's novice, numerous works took place, in order to expand the monastery:

- The Church "The Birth of Saint John the Baptist" was rebuilt from stone, in 1844. The church was initially built from wood in 1817, in the old monastery cemetery. Around 1880 several improvements were made to the building, and the interior walls and the iconostasis icons were painted.
- The "Transfiguration" Church was built during 1845–1847, due to the extension of the monastic settlement towards south and south-west.
- The inner painting of the "Dormition of the Virgin Mary" Church was redone in 1882, by painters T. Ioan and D. Iliescu

Văratec Monastery also housed a liturgical music school (1859–1860); a mixed village school (from January 1860); The Primary Girl School (from 1 September 1860); as well as a "School for adults" (from 1 September 1911 until 1943) which was frequented by the nuns up to 50 years old who hadn't graduated primary school; The Monastic Seminary for Nuns (1948–1950); and also the monastic and liturgical music school (from 1940).

The following superior mothers after Mother Eufrosina Lazu were Abbess Eugenia Negri (1887–1894) and Abbess Veniamina Hermeziu (1894–1904).

=== Văratec Monastery in the 20th century ===
Văratec Monastery was affected by a great fire during the night of 10/11 June 1900, which burned most of the cells and the roof of the main church. After the fire the church roof was rebuilt with only two steeples, without the former wooden steeples. The actual building complex was built from the monastery enclosure, the only original building being the surrounding wall, built during 1808–1812. "Saint Nicholas" Chapel was rebuilt during 1903–1909, the iconostasis and the interiors were painted by hieromonk Eftimie Obrocea from Ciolanu Monastery.

There were 304 nuns and sisters living in Văratec, in the year 1909, under abbess Evghenia Teodor.

In 1934, at the idea of metropolitan Pimen Georgescu of Moldavia, a building was established on the southern side of the enclosure, the "Queen Mary" workshop, where the nuns worked on church embroidery, carpets and national canvas. In the monastery, in November 1940 functioned several workshops: church embroidery and book binding, carpets, knitting, church painting and decorative art, most of them being still present. From 1960, this building has been set up as museum, housing a rich collection of exhibits.

A bronze statue of Saftei Brâncoveanu, made by sculptor Ion Jalea was placed in 1935, close to the eastern apse of the "Dormition of the Virgin Mary" Church.

Important consolidation, restoration and renewal works have been made, beginning with 1962, with the financial and technical support of the state and of Moldavia and Suceava Mitropoly, both for the three churches as for the guest

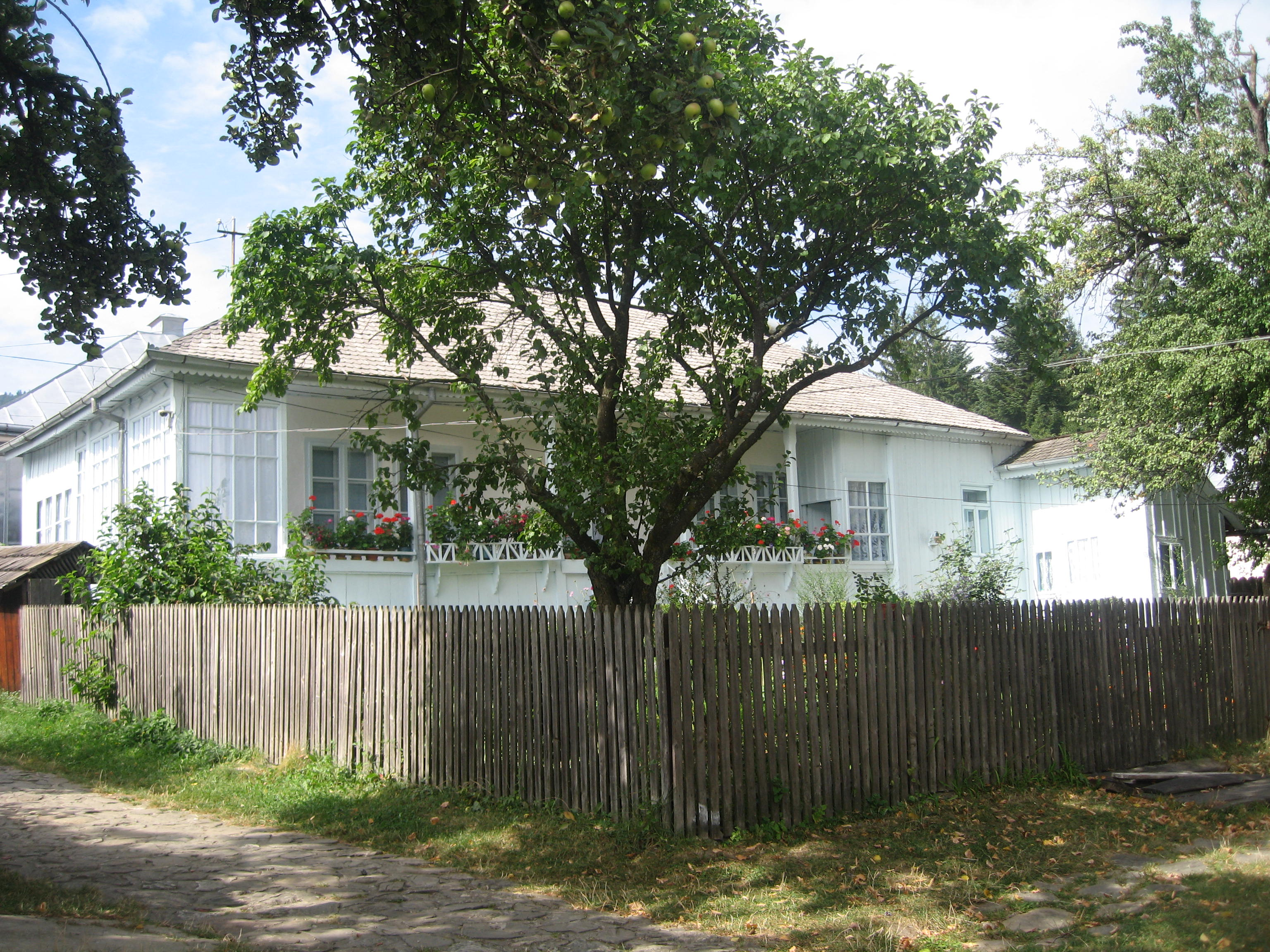
Cell (nun house)

chamber and for some of the buildings in Văratec Monastery. During 1968–1969 the restorer painter Arutium Avachian washed and restored the painting for the "Dormition of the Virgin Mary" Church.

During abbess stavrophore Nazaria Niță (1973–1995), Văratec Monastery was visited by patriarchs Pimen Izvekov of Moscow, Diodor of Jerusalem and Dimitrios of Constantinopole, and also by a large number of Orthodox Church hierarchs, and by other representatives of Christian Churches.

A basin was installed in 1985 in place of the altar of the old wooden church, the statue of an angel with a cross in his arms being placed there.

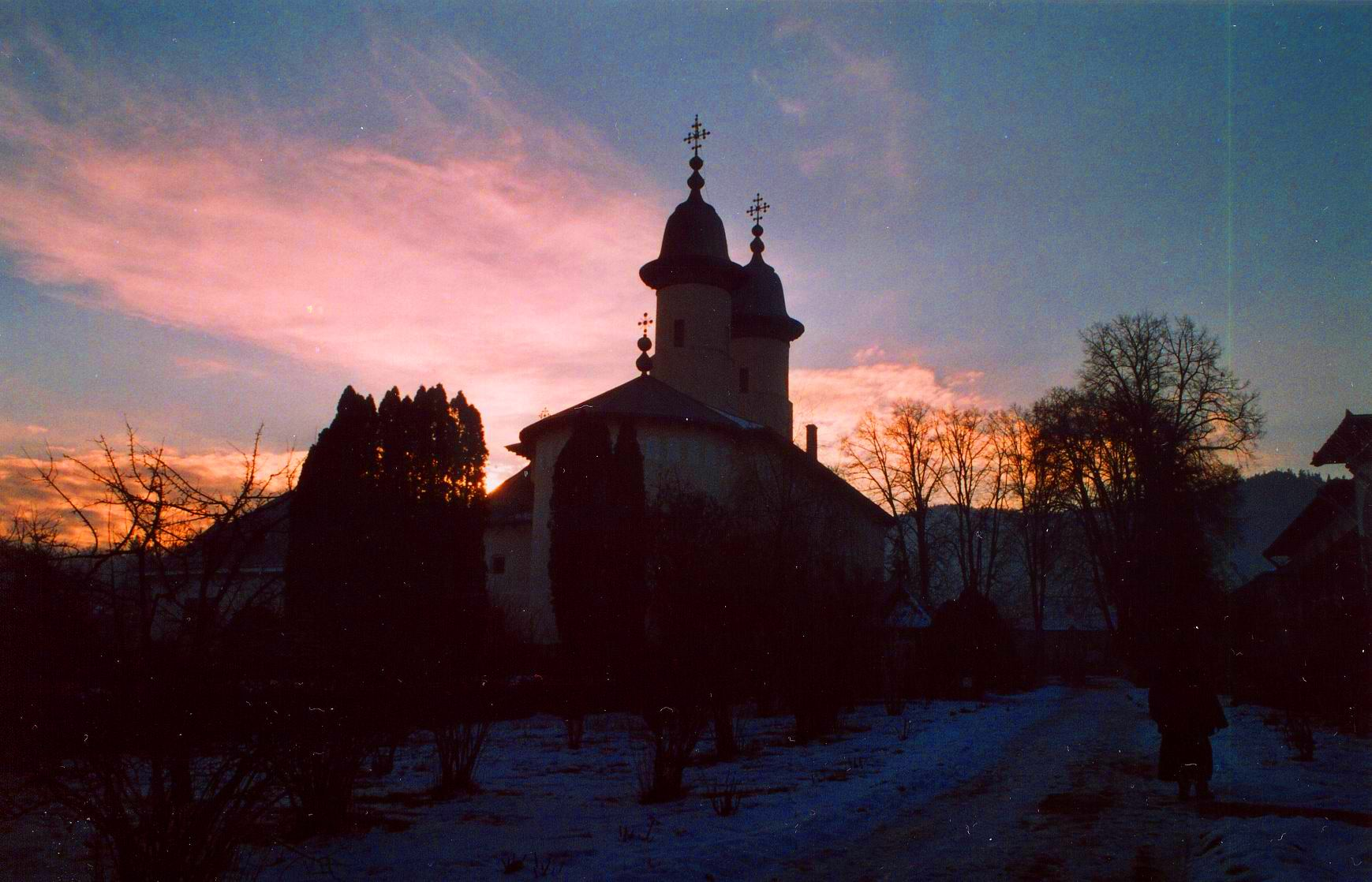
Văratec Monastery – sunset

The superior mothers leading the monastic life in this place during the 20th century were:

- Evghenia Teodor – abbess around the year 1909
- archimandrite Irina G. Lecca (20 January 1881 – 30 November 1953) – abbess during 1940–1942 and 1946–1951
- stavrophore Margareta Ocolescu (10 February 1916 – 6 January 1996) -abbess during 1951 – 1954
- schema nun Pelaghia Amilcar (1885–1981) – abbess during 1942–1946 and 1954–1972
- stavrophore Nazaria Niță (7 May 1928 – 28 October 2001) – hegumen during 1958–1965 and abbess during 1973–1995

=== Văratec Monastery in the 21st century ===
From 2002 the monastery abbess is stavrophore mother Iosefina Giosanu, sister of Ioachim Giosanu bishop and niece of Ioanichie Bălan archimandrite.

In the meeting of the Holy Synod of Romanian Orthodox Church from 5–7 March 2008, at the proposal of the Moldavia and Bucovina metropolitan, they discussed sanctifying nine saints from Neamț county. The Holy Synod decided that the nine proposed saints were canonized (sanctified). Father Iosif of Văratec is also among the nine canonized saints, and his celebration day was chosen to be 16 August. The solemn proclamation of the nine Neamț saints took place on 5 June 2008, at Neamț Monastery, and was celebrated by the patriarch Daniel.

On 16 August 2008, during the feast of the titular saint of the Church "Dormition of the Virgin Mary", a special local service took place at Văratec Monastery, to proclaim the sanctification of Father Iosif, founder and confessor of the monastery. The religious service was held by metropolitan Teofan Savu of Moldova and Bucovina, which read the sanctification act of Saint Iosif. Archbishop Pimen Zainea, of Suceava and Rădăuți, Bishop-vicar Calinic Botoșăneanul of Iași Archdiocese, and Ioachim Băcăuanul, Bishop-vicar of Huși diocese also took part in the service.

=== Famous people who lived here ===
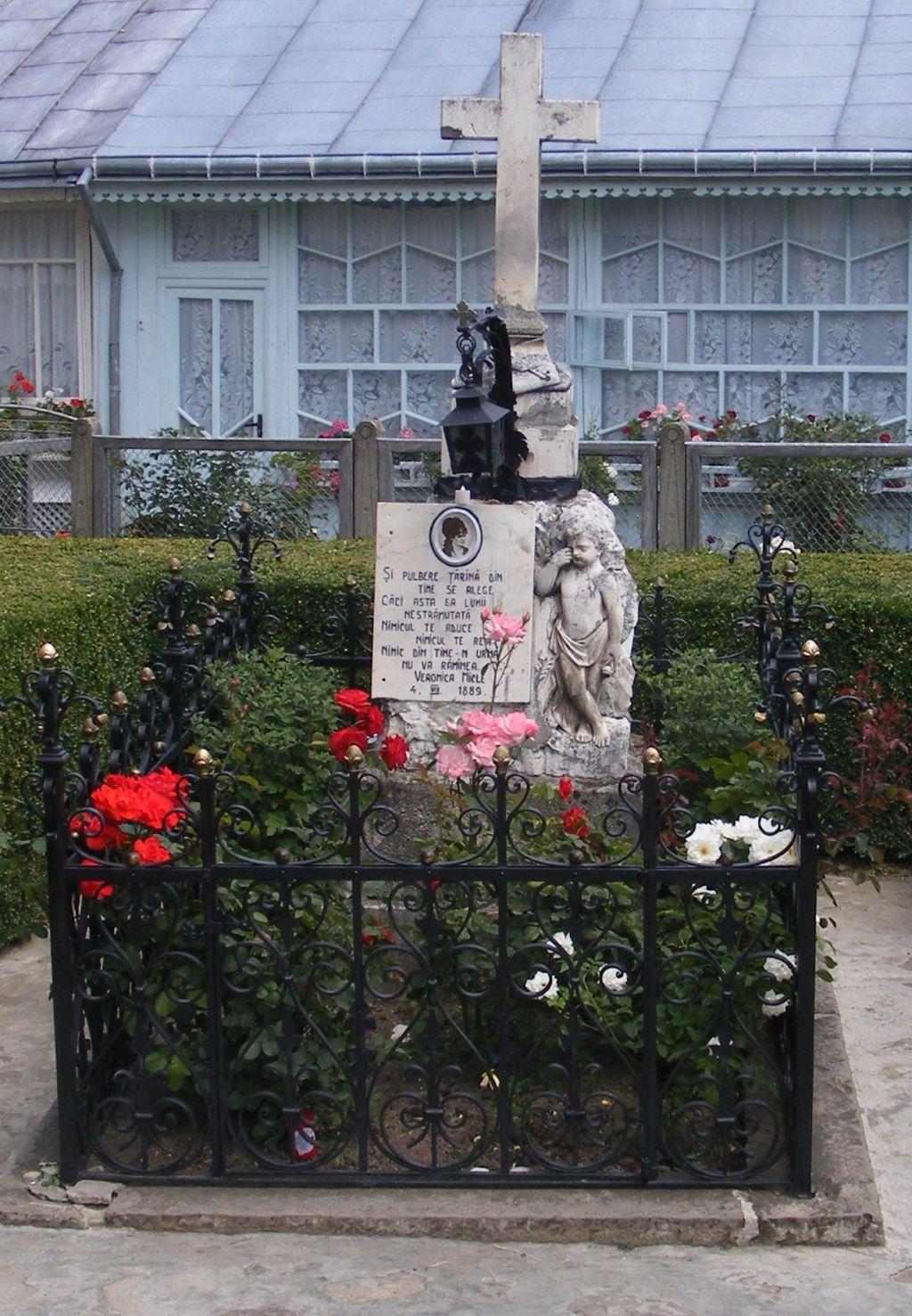
Grave of Veronica Micle at Văratec Monastery

Over the years, many theologians and people of culture lived here.

- Poet Veronica Micle (1850–1889), withdrew here two weeks after the funeral of Mihai Eminescu. She lived in Fevronia Sârbu's house. She had strong migraines and was depressed. In the night 2/3 August 1889 she committed suicide with arsenic. She is buried in the monastery's cemetery.
- Protosinghel (monk) Nicodim Măndiță (1889–1975), author of religious books. He was confessor in Văratec during 1945–1962.
- Bishop Partenie Ciopron (1896–1980), ex-bishop of the Army (1937–1948) and of Roman and Huși (1962–1978). After 15 years of being bishop in Roman and Huși diocese, he withdrew on 1 January 1978 to Văratec Monastery, where he died on 28 July 1980. He is buried in the monastery's cemetery.
- Archimandrite Bartolomeu Anania (1921–2011), future metropolitan of Cluj, Alba, Crișana, and Maramureș, retired to Văratec Monastery in 1982, from his function of director at the Biblical and Mission Orthodox Church Institute, in order to write. He received an apartment in the house of Partenie Ciopron bishop. There he wrote many poems and prose volumes. He also began here the correction and annotation of the Holy Scripture, working until late at night. He lived here until he was chosen archbishop of Vad, Feleac and Cluj, on January the 21st 1993.
- Academician Zoe Dumitrescu Bușulenga (1920–2006), who withdrew around 2000 to Văratec Monastery, where, in 2005, she became a nun under the name sister Benedicta. She is buried at the cemetery of Putna Monastery.

== The Church "Dormition of the Virgin Mary" ==
=== History ===
The Church "Dormition of the Virgin Mary" was built during 1808–1812, and consecrated in 1812. It was painted in 1841, and then reconsecrated by metropolitan Veniamin Costachi and an inscription was also placed over the narthex entrance door. This inscription is written in Romanian with Latin alphabet and it says: "In the year 1808 this holy church was built, with the titular saint Dormition of the Virgin Mary, through the holy works of Father Iosif the confessor and of superior mother Olimbiada, and the first founders were the nuns in this place. The second founders where Lady Elencu Paladi, who gave four domains and mother Elisaveta Balș, who gave Vulturești domain, mother Safta Brâncoveanu, who gave the domains Osica and Vlâdulenii with many other properties in her will. And the other domains, vineyards and other outbuildings are written in the book of life, for their eternal memory. 1841 October 20".

The interior fresco (wall painting) was redone, in neo-Byzantine style, in 1882, as it is stated in an inscription situated in the northern side of the porch: "This church was painted in oil by painters T. Ioan and D. Iliescu in the year 1882". Due to smoke, the painting was washed and cleaned in the years 1968–1969 by the restorer painter Arutium Avachian.

The edifice initially had two wall steeples (on the nave and narthex). Two smaller wooden steeples war latter added, above the porch and the altar. In 1900, the church roof burned in a fire and the wooden steeples were not rebuilt anymore.

On the right side of the church narthex, in front of the sustaining pillars of the belfry, lies the grave of confessor Iosif, the founder of the monastery, who died on 28 December 1828. On his gravestone, which is no longer the original one, lays written: "Pious hieroschemamonk Iosif, founder and confessor of the holy Văratec Monastery, deceased on the 28th Dec. 1828". His face is represented on the wall situated behind the grave. Some specialists assume that in the same area of the church are the graves of mothers Olimpiada, Nazaria (1788–1814) and Magdalena (1815–1822), without being marked.

=== Architecture ===
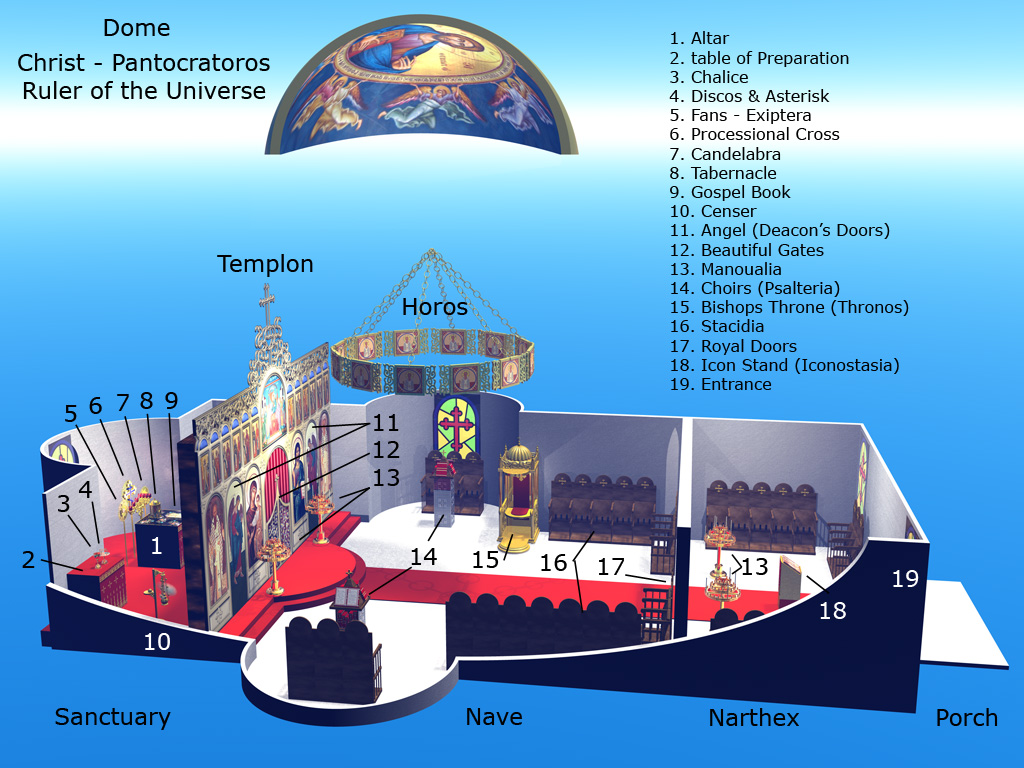
Orthodox church interior (generic)

The church "Dormition of the Virgin Mary" was built from river rock and from bricks. It is rectangular, without apses, with the altar apse being semicircular. The edifice sits on four short piers. Under the eaves the church is surrounded by a belt of blind alcoves. There are two stone steeples on the roof (on the narthex and the nave), with semicircular shape, sitting on polygonal bases. The church has two lateral doors, on north and on the south of the porch, each with its own small porch and bulb shaped roof, and there is also another door in the deacon's wall (on the south side of the church). The interior has four areas: porch, narthex, nave and altar. Over the porch there is a special place, where the valuable monastery goods were kept. Between the narthex and the nave there are two massive pillars with iconic style column heads. Lateral apses are hollowed in the lateral sides of the nave, in the thickness of the walls. The iconostasis (templon), separating the nave from the altar (sanctuary), is sculpted in yew wood and gilded in gold. It was made by Constantin Zugravul in 1816, on the expense of lady Elencu Paladi. The altar apse has a semicircular shape, with a deacon room on the south side and niche for the table of oblation (where the Holy Communion is prepared, during the Divine Liturgy).

=== Tombs near the altar apse ===
Outside the church, under the altar apse there is an ossuary where the bones of the mothers who played an important role in the monastic community were moved from the old monastery cemetery.

- archimandrite Eugenia Negri (1818–1894) – sister of the political figure and writer Costache Negri and mother superior of Văratec Monastery from 1887 to 1894. Above her tomb is a marble funerary monument with a bass relief of a house in a mountain forest, and a Romanian inscription saying: "Here lays Her Holiness Mother Maica Eugenia Negri Archimandrite and Mother Superior of Varaticulŭ Monastery, born in 1818 and deceased in 1894. Pray for Her!" And the sculptor name is written at the base "G. Franzoni Jassy".
- archimandrite Veniamina Hermeziu (1 March 1821 – 24 February 1904) – superior mother from 6 August 1894 to 24 February 1904. On her marble funerary monument is the next inscription in Romanian: "Archimandrite Veniamina Hermeziu 1821 (1 March) – 1904 (24 February) Superior Mother of Văratec Monastery 1894 (6 August) – 1904 (24 February)".
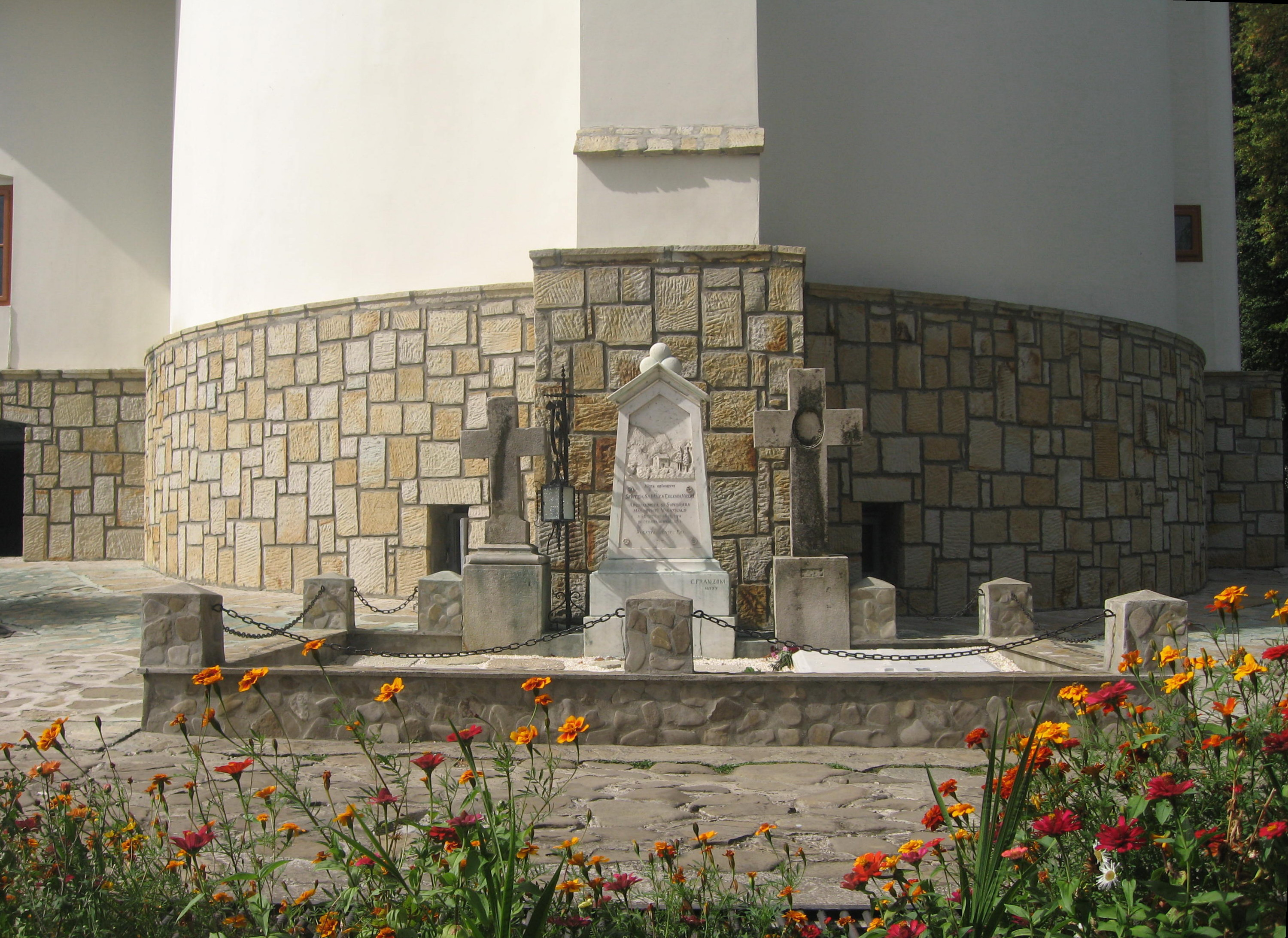
  Tombs behind the altar apse
- schema nun Evghenia Ștefănescu (1821 – 19 July 1889) – daughter of priest Petru from Gârcina and sister of bishop Melchisedec Ștefănescu of Roman; she was in charge the monastery's financial administration.
- archimandrite Eufrosina Lazu (1797 – 13 May 1887) – Mother Olimpiada's novice and superior mother of the monastery from 1844 to 13 May 1887. On her marble funerary monument is the next inscription in Romanian: "Archimandrite Efrosina Lazu born in 1797, became a nun in 1814, chosen superior mother in 1844. Died on the 13th of May 1887".
- Ecaterina Balș (22 July 1814 – August 1887) – born in the Dimachi family, second wife of general Teodor Balș (1805–1857), locum tenens of Moldavia's lord during 1856–1857, with whom she got married on 30 June 1846 in Dimăcheni (Dorohoi). On her marble funerary monument is the next inscription in Romanian, with Cyrillic characters: "Here is laid to rest Ecaterina Feodor Balș, general Feodor Balș's wife, born on the 22nd July 1814 deceased in August 1887".
- Veniamina Pribagu (died in 1895) – in charge the monastery's financial administration.

== Other churches of the monastery ==
=== The Church The Birth of Saint John the Baptist ===
The church The Birth of Saint John the Baptist was built of wood in 1817, in the old monastery cemetery, situated at about approximately 150 m south-east of the Church "Dormition of the Virgin Mary", on a low crest. This place was built through the assiduity of mother Olimpiada, founder of the monastery.

The cemetery church was rebuilt in stone in 1844, as an inscription on the west wall states, during the superior mother Eufrosina Lazu. Considering the raising of the church, we can read the following in the chronicle of the church: "The founders of the holy church were first of all Her Holiness schema nun Eufrosina Lazu, archimandrite and superior mother of the holy Văratecu Monastery. And second, the monastic community and other well-doers". It has been improved around the year 1880.

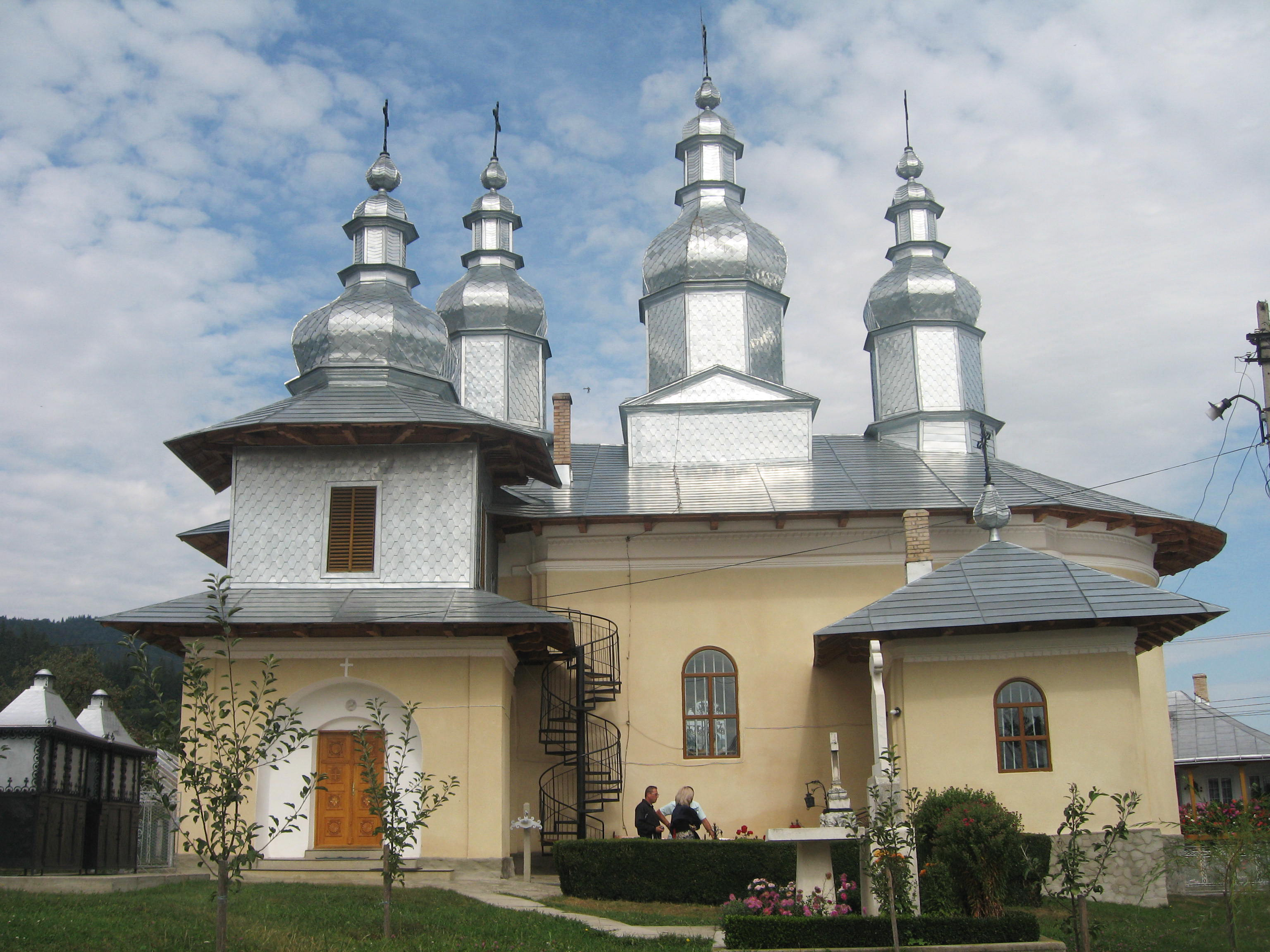
The Birth of Saint John the Baptist Church, built in 1844

The church has a rectangular shape, with a porch in the south-west corner and a deacon's room in the south-east corner. There is a bell-tower above the porch, with a wooden steeple above. On the church's roof there are three tall wooden steeples.

The interior consists of the porch, narthex, nave and altar. The narthex is separated from the nave by a massive arcade, and the lateral apses are hollowed in the thickness of the walls. The interior walls of the church and the iconostasis icons were painted in 1880 by painters T. Ioan and D. Iliescu, the same painters who painted in 1882 the walls for the Church "Dormition of the Virgin Mary".

Close to the southern church wall is the tomb of poet Veronica Micle (1850–1889). This is the only tomb which remained from the old monastery's cemetery, after the exhumation of the bodies from the other tombs and their deposit in the ossuary situated beneath the "Dormition of the Virgin Mary" church's altar. On her marble funerary stone is an epitaph she wrote herself:

From you remain just ashes
For this is our world's law.
The nothingness creates you,
The nothingness retakes you,
You leave nothing behind.
Veronica Micle. 4. VIII. 1889

Now this church is used for the nuns' daily prayer.

=== The Transfiguration Church ===
The Transfiguration Church was built during 1845–1847, through the assiduity of mother Eufrosina Lazu, and it was consecrated on 2 November 1847. The construction of this church took place as an extension of the monastic settlement towards south and south-west. The titular saint is the Transfiguration, celebrated every 6 August.

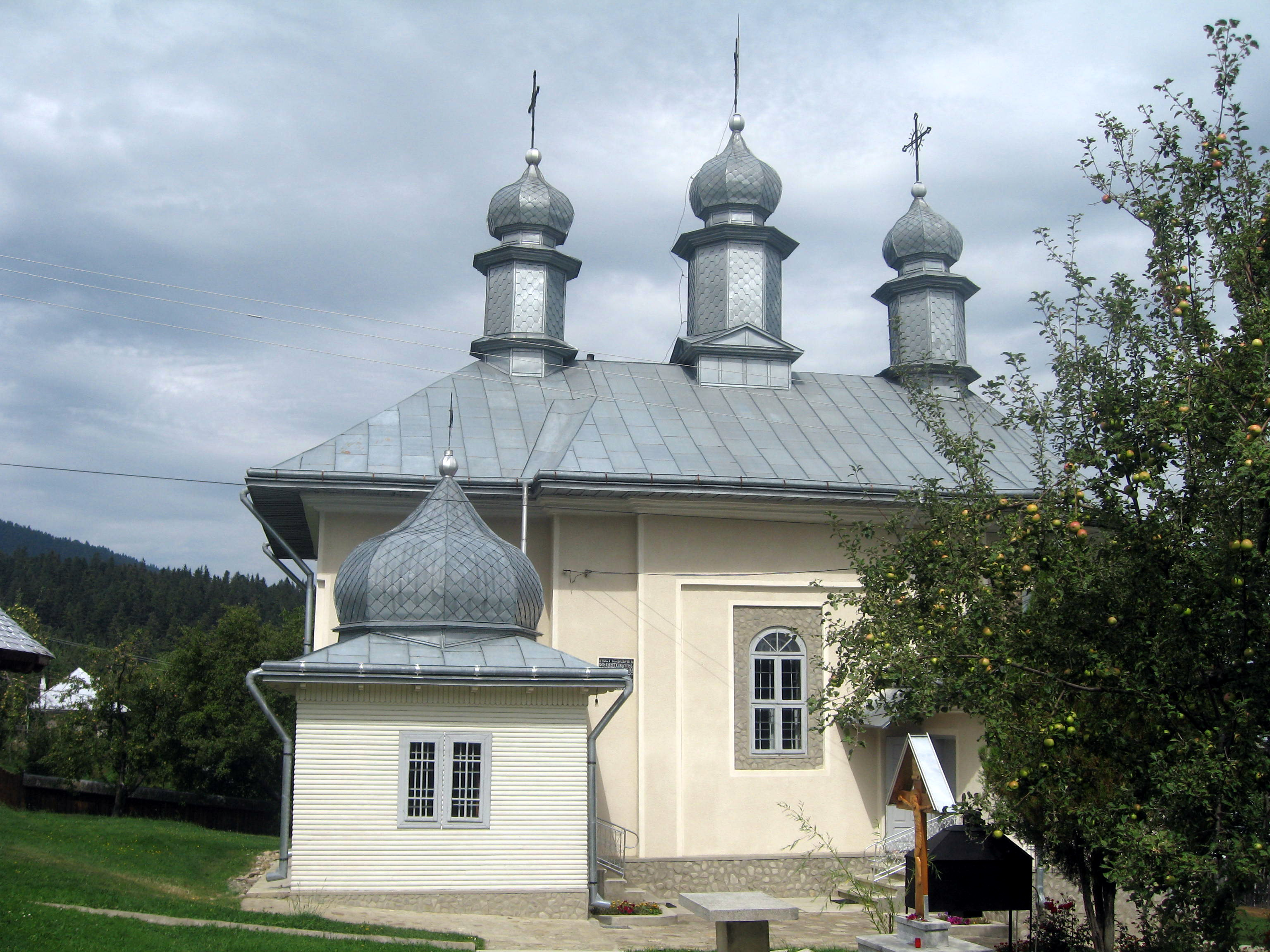
"The Transfiguration" Church, consecrated in 1847

On the south wall of the edifice is an inscription in Romanian with the following text: "This church was built on the expense of the well-doers and through the assiduity of Her Holiness mother E(u)frosina Laz(u) superior mother of Varatecul, and was consecrated in 1847, November 2".

The church has a rectangular shape, with a wooden porch in the south-western corner. On the church's roof there are three tall wooden steeples. It was initially segmented in narthex, nave and altar but they added a wooden porch later, to protect the south-west entrance. The iconostasis is old, dating from the middle of the 19th century. The church was painted in 1965 by Eremia Profeta (1914–2002).

A bell tower was built at the entrance of the church's yard, containing a bell from the time of mother Olimpiada (1838) and another one from Eufrosina Lazu (1851).

Today the courtyard of the church is the entrance to the actual monastery graveyard, situated in the north-west of the monastery.

== The bell tower ==
The bell tower is a massive stone constructions, included in the cell building on the eastern side of the enclosure, built in the first half of the 19th century. This cell building has two levels, with a large stoop, supported by rows of wooden columns.

Situated at a distance of 80 m east from the Church "Dormition of the Virgin Mary", the bell tower has an entrance alleyway at the ground floor and two square shaped levels. In the first floor room the "Saint Nicholas" Chapel was set up in the 1840–1850. The bell tower roof has a Mithras shape.

== Heritage objects ==
A museum was set up in a few rooms during 1960–1961, where the collection of religious objects is exposed – embroidery, icons, liturgical vessel, manuscripts, crosses etc. – with historical and artistic value.

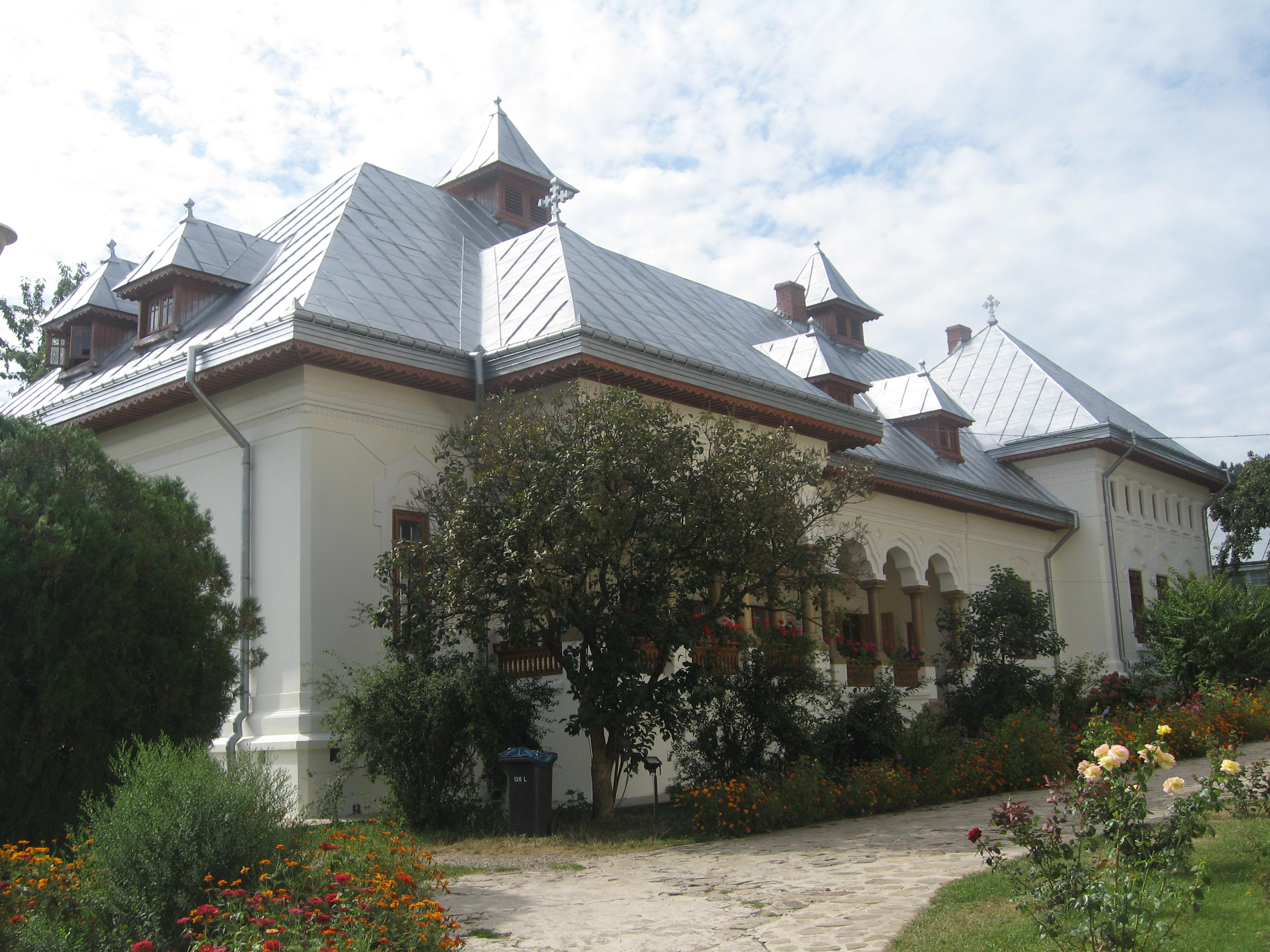
Monastery museum

These heritage objects include the following.

- Icons from the 15th century from Râșca Monastery and from the 16th to 18th centuries from the churches in Văleni – Piatra-Neamț and Topolița
- Icons dressed in silver gilded in gold by Ion Atanasiu, from Iași, in 1827.
- An epitaph worked in golden and silver wire, by Smaranda Niculce in 1798.
- Phelonion, epitrachelion and epimanikia with floral motives, embroiled on garnet velvet with golden and silver wire by Safta Brâncoveanu.
- A three-arms cross, sculpted in 1596 from cypress wood, and brought from Topolița Skete.
- An olive wood procession cross, donated in 1852 by Gheorghe and Maria Hermeziu.
- A silver gilded in gold chalice, given in 1840 by Safta Brâncoveanu.
- A Slavic Evangelion (Gospel Book), printed in Liov in 1644, with silver binding.
- A Greek Evangelion, printed in Venice in 1811, with silver gilded in gold binding and adorned with enameled icons.
- The great Evangelion, printed in 1821 in Neamț Monastery, with silver gilded in gold binding.
- Târnosania, manuscript with leather binding, copied in 1752 by protopop Vasilie.
- Hronograf, manuscript with leather binding, copied in 1805 by mother Olimpiada.
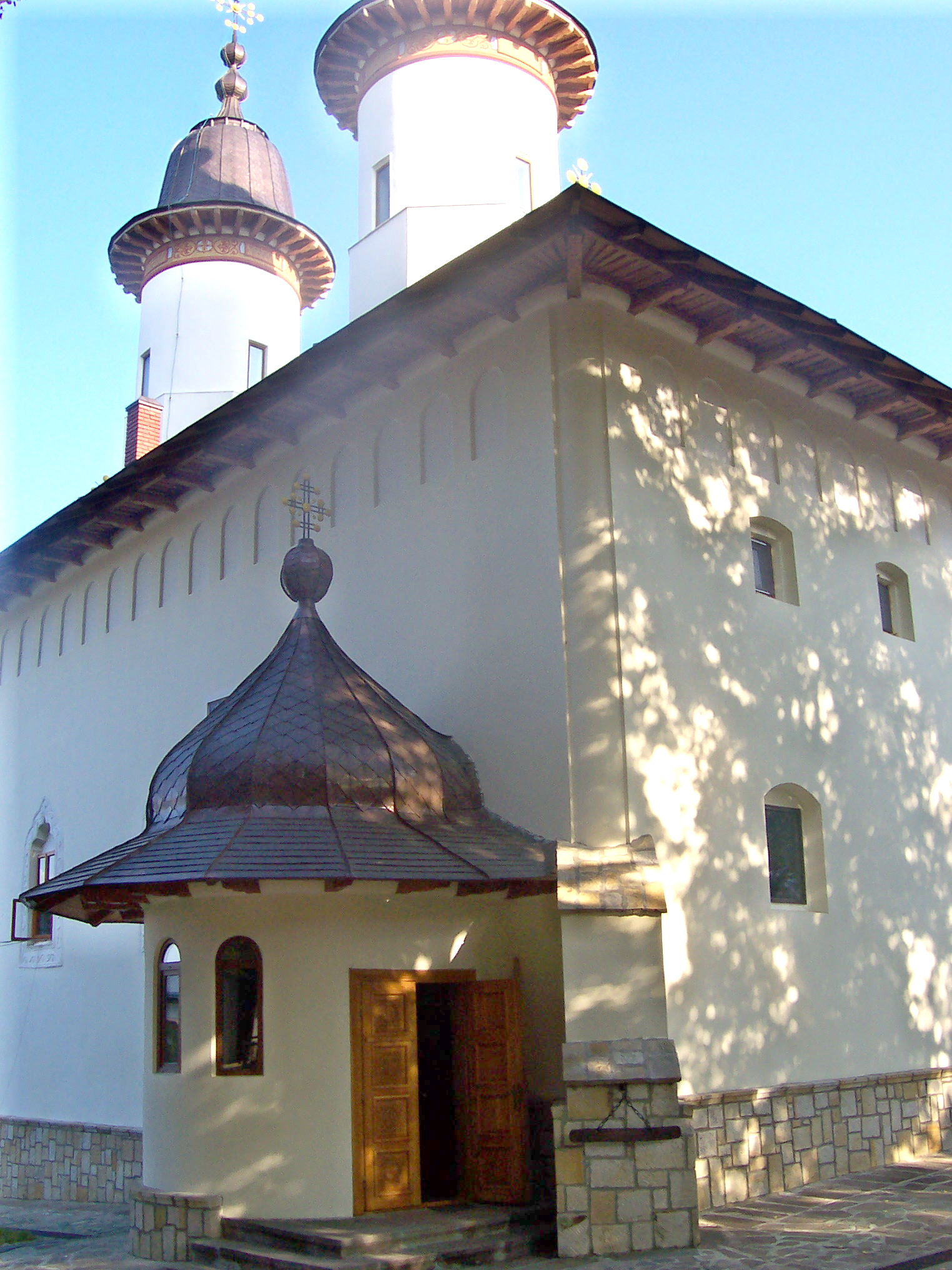
The church's main entrance

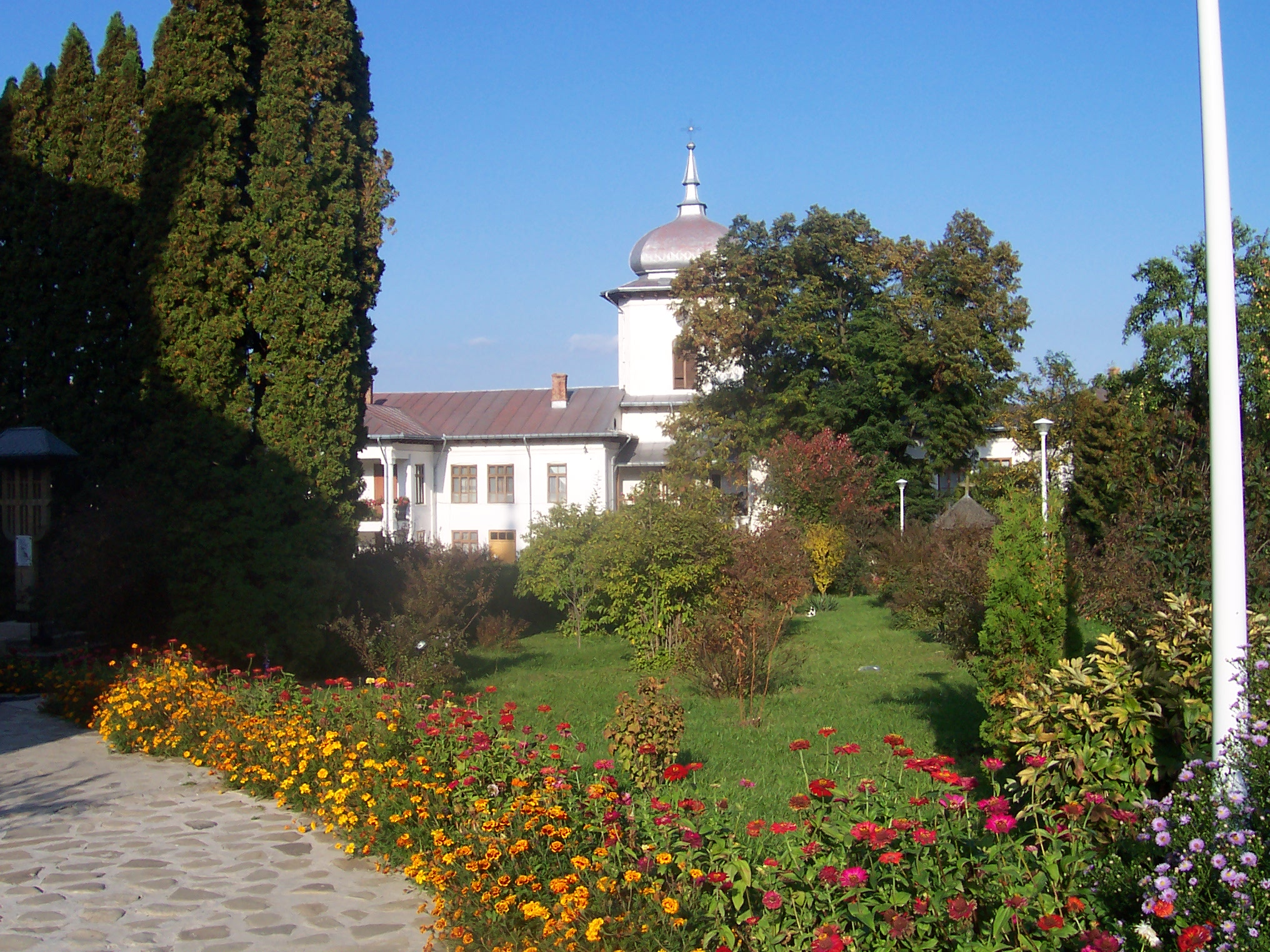
The garden

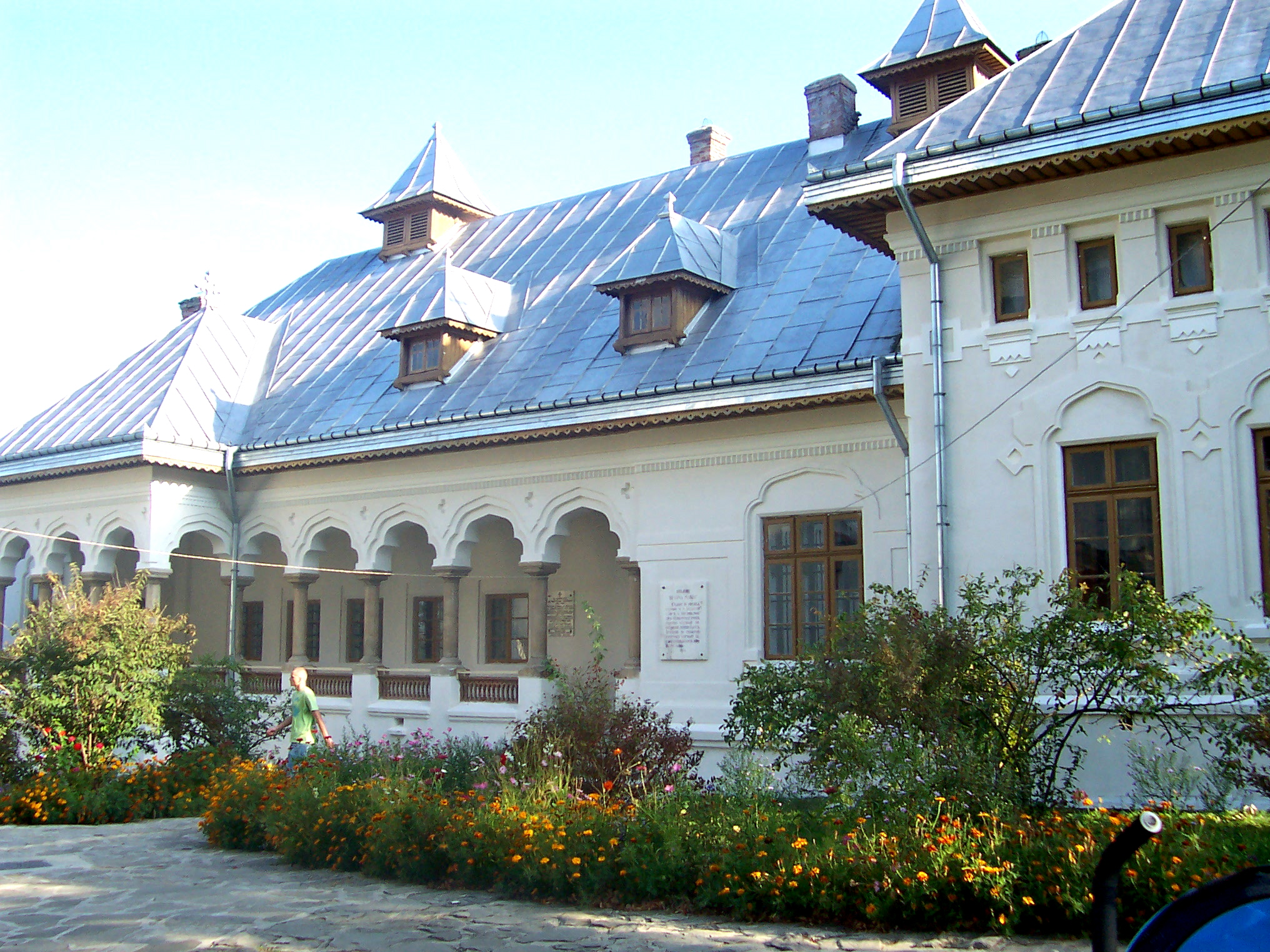
The inner court

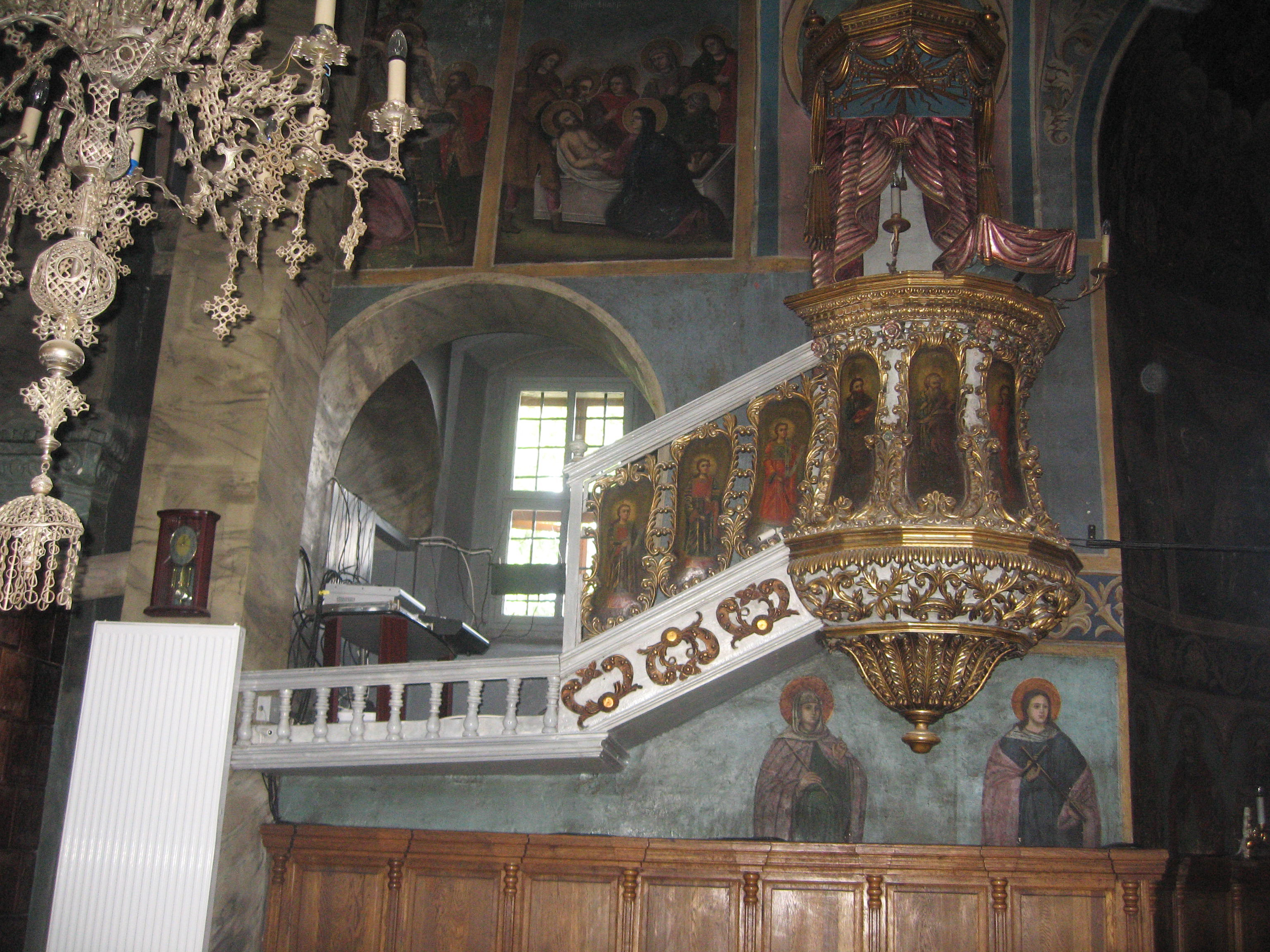
The pulpit of the Church "Dormition of the Virgin Mary"

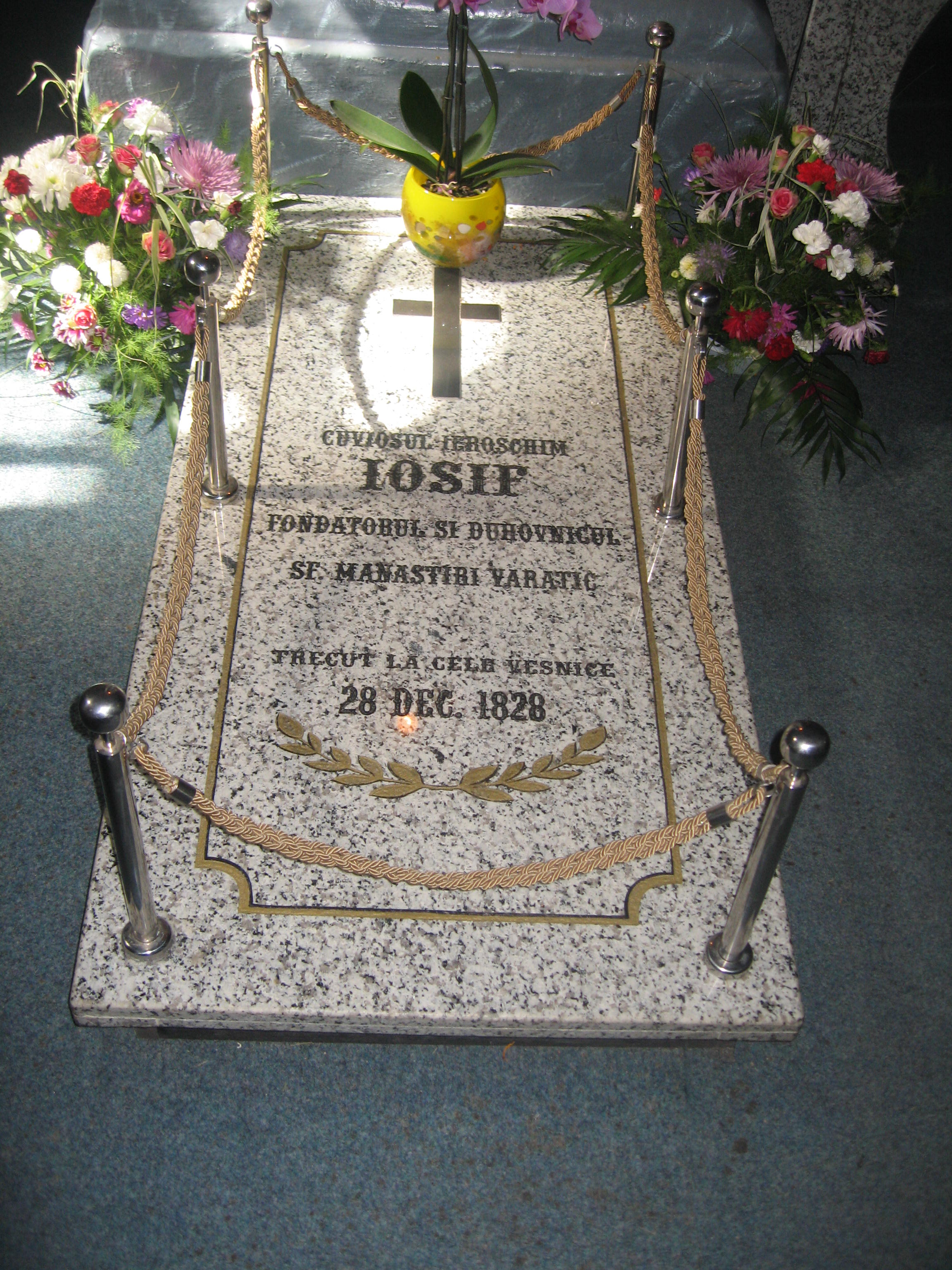
Hieroschemamonk Iosif's grave

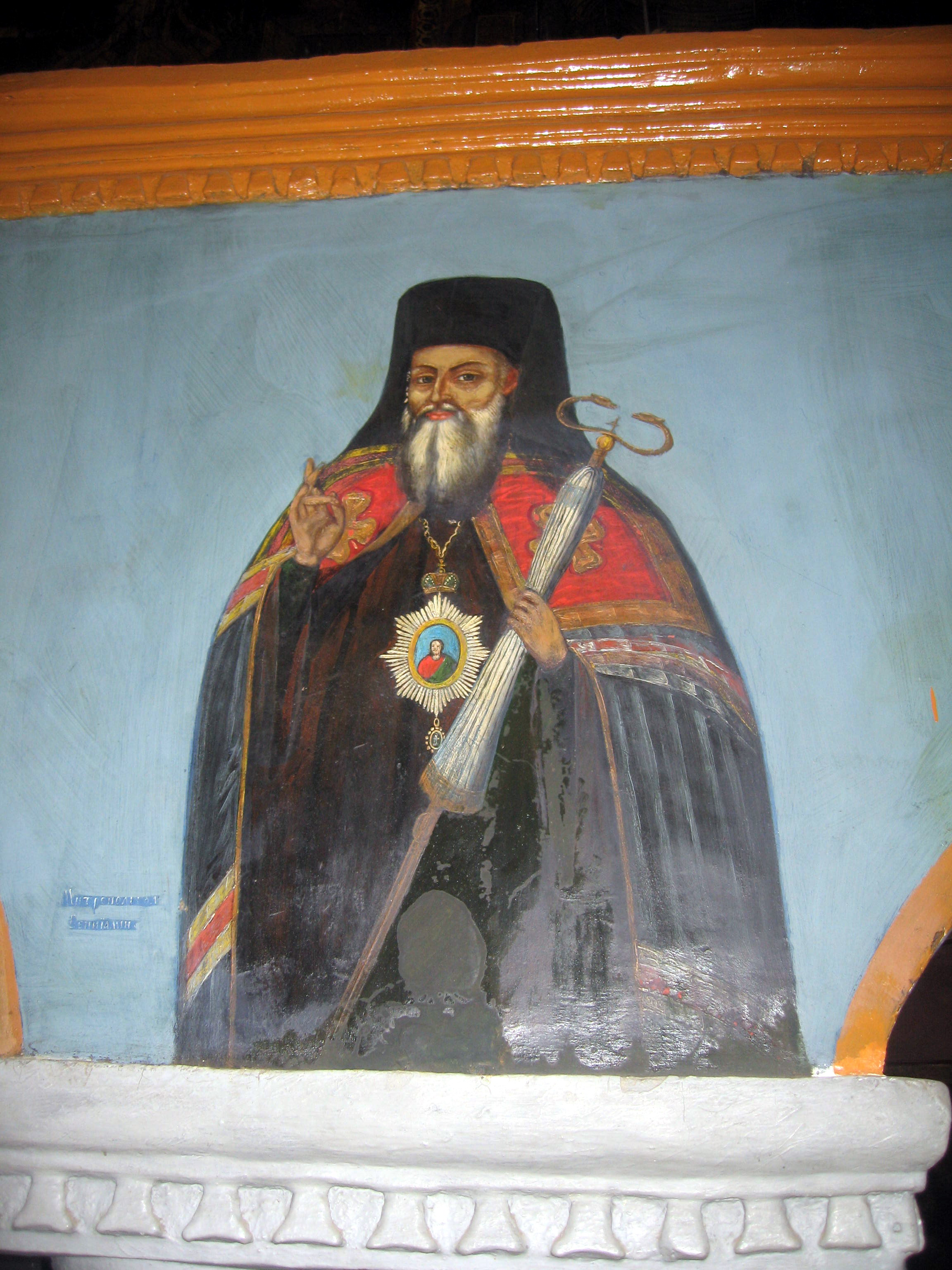
Metropolitan Veniamin Costachi

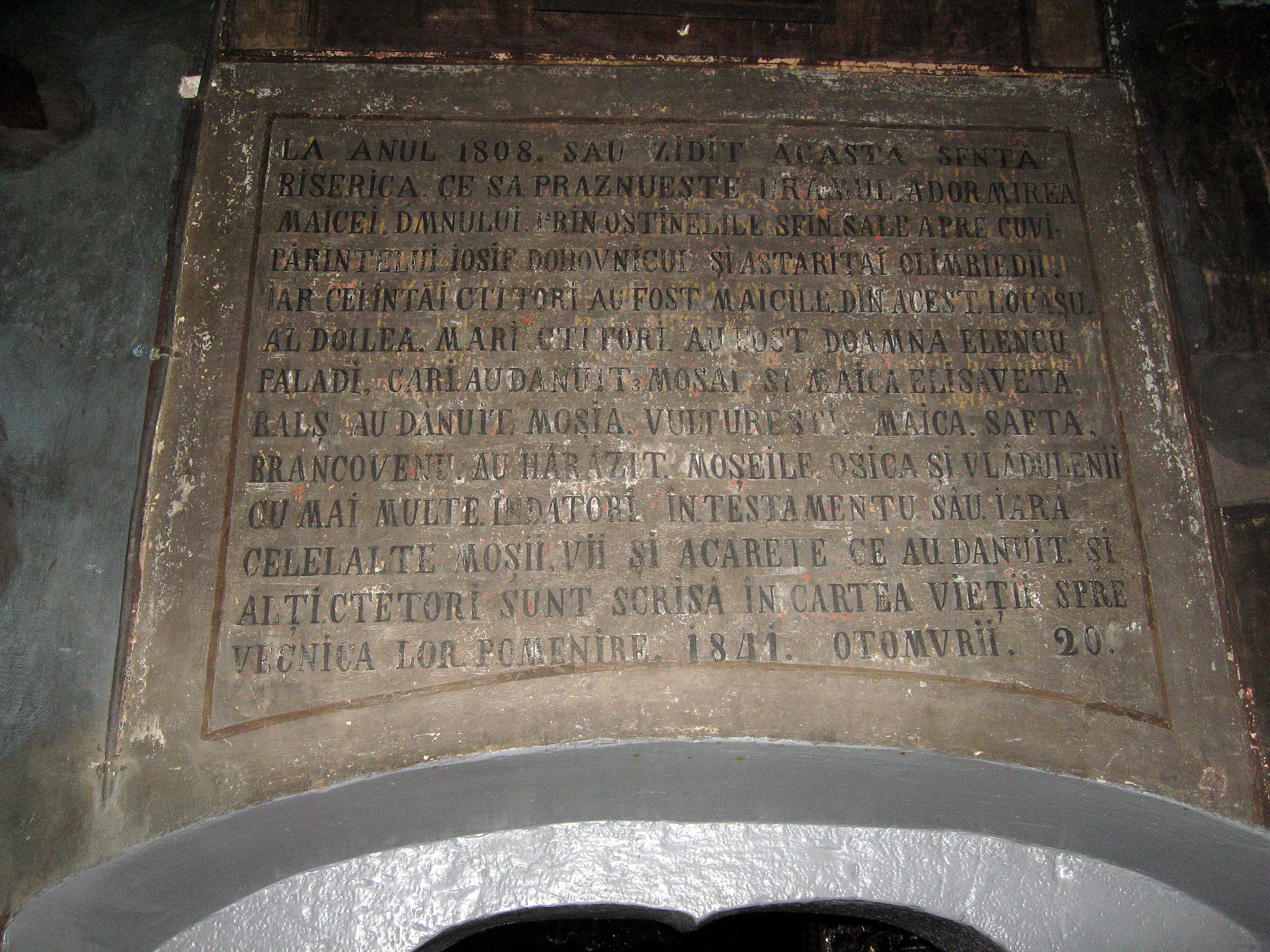
Inscription of the church "Dormition of the Virgin Mary"

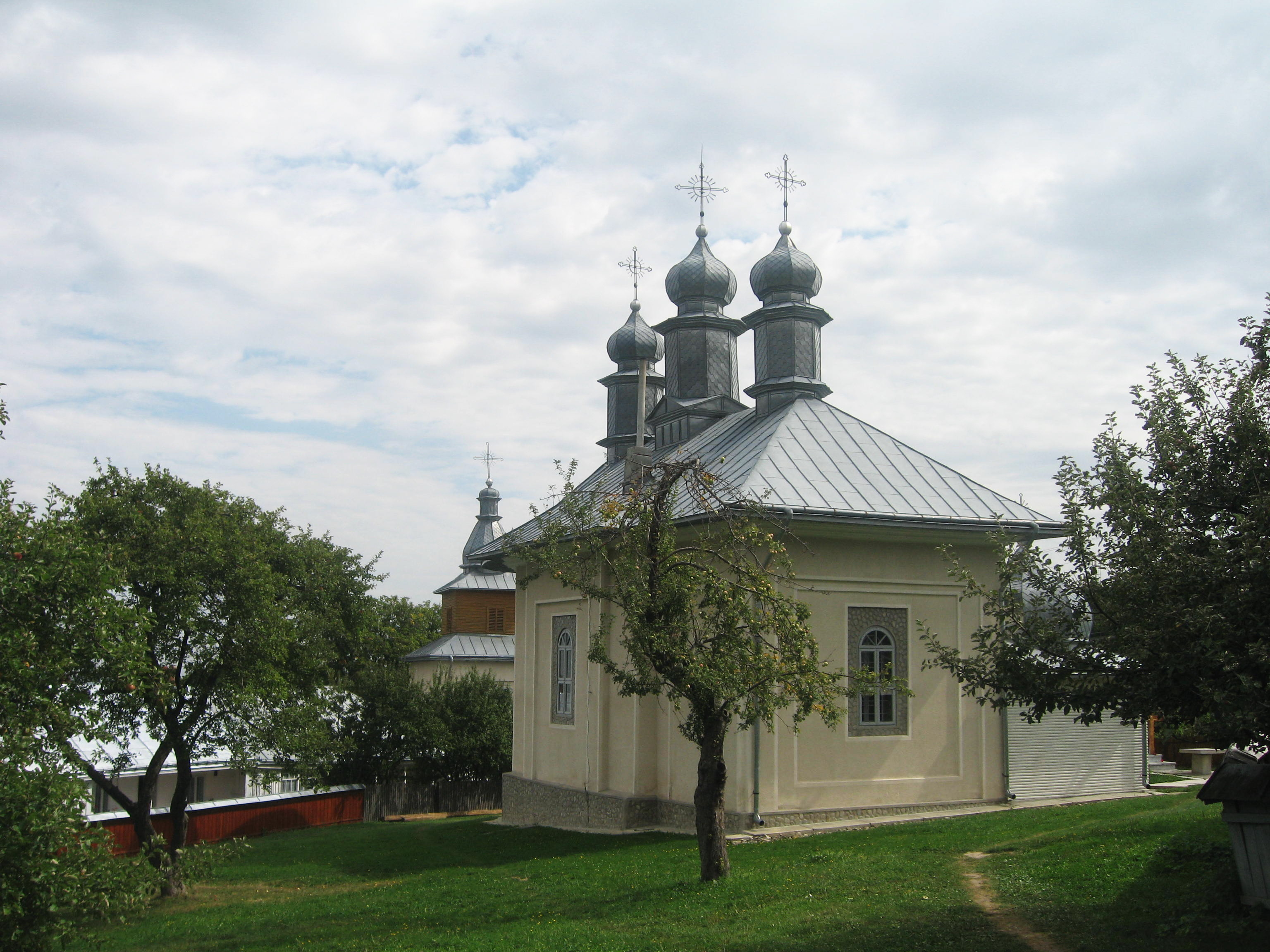
The Transfiguration Church, west view
