= Agapia =

- Commune
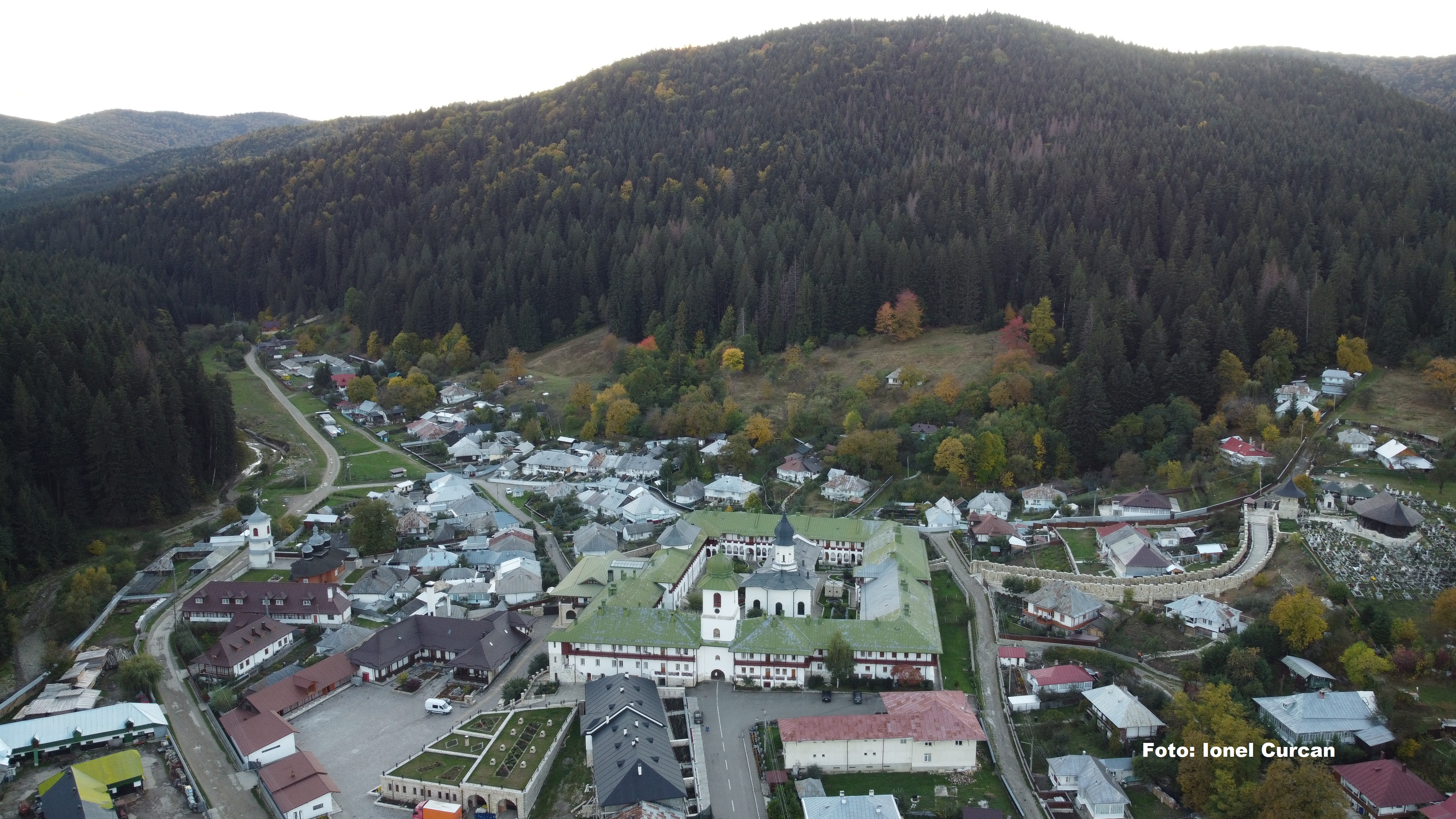
- Agapia Monastery

- Location in Neamț County

- Location in Romania
- Coordinates: 47°10′N 26°17′E
- Country: Romania
- County: Neamț
- Subdivisions: Agapia, Filioara, Săcălușești, Văratec

Government
  - Mayor (2024–2028): Neculai Nastasă (PSD)
- Area: 58.58 km^{2} (22.62 sq mi)
- Elevation: 470 m (1,540 ft)
- Population (2021-12-01): 3,696
  - Density: 63.09/km^{2} (163.4/sq mi)
- Time zone: UTC+02:00 (EET)
  - Summer (DST): UTC+03:00 (EEST)
- Postal code: 617010
- Area code: (+40) x33
- Vehicle reg.: NT
- Website: agapia.ro

Agapia is a commune in Neamț County, Western Moldavia, Romania. It is composed of four villages: Agapia, Filioara, Săcălușești, and Văratec. The commune is the site of Agapia Monastery and Văratec Monastery.

== Demographics ==
Historical population
Year	Pop.	±%
1992	4,353	—
2002	4,542	+4.3%
2011	3,893	−14.3%
2021	3,696	−5.1%
Source: Census data

At the 2002 census, the commune had 4,542 inhabitants, 100% of which were ethnic Romanians, and 99.2% Romanian Orthodox. At the 2021 census Agapia had a population of 3,696; of those, 87.12% were Romanians.

== Natives ==
- Constanța Marino-Moscu (1875–1940), short story writer
