= Safta Castrișoaia =

19th-century Romanian merchant

Safta Castrișoaia (died 1862) was a Romanian merchant.

She inherited and managed a merchant empire from her late spouse, the Greek merchant trader Gheorghe Castrișiu (d. 1810), who emigrated from Greece to Bucharest, Romania, where he became a successful merchant trader in luxury goods from Austria and Hungary and exported goods from Romania to the Habsburg lands. She expanded the company of her spouse and managed a chain of luxury shops in central Bucharest, owned several estates and founded a pleasure ground as well as a luxurious inn fashionable among the rich boyars and foreigners in Bucharest. She was also an influential philanthropist who gave regular donations to pay for free places for poor patients in hospitals as well as for the newly established national theatre.
