= Ștefan Micle =

Romanian physicist and chemist

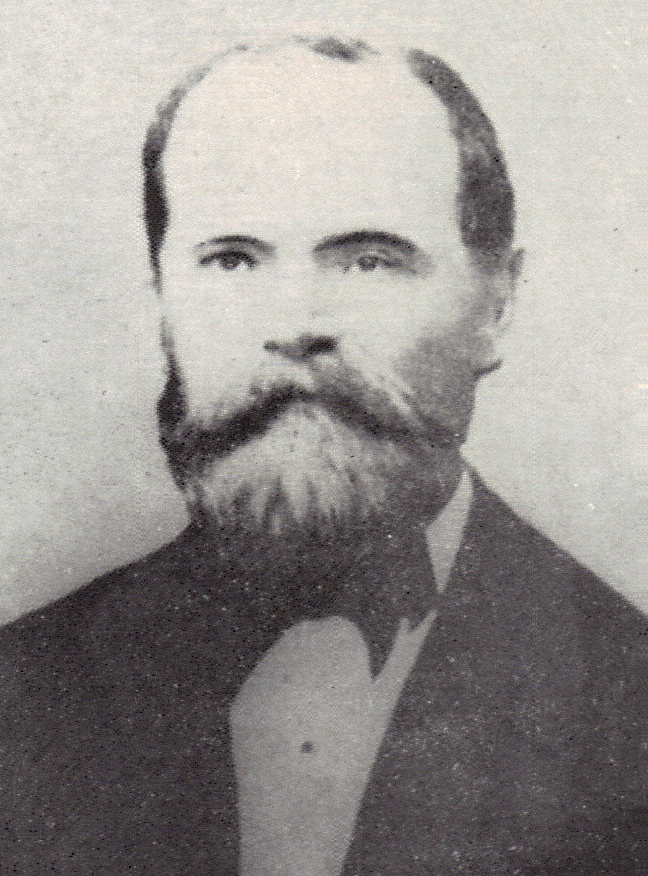
Ștefan Micle

Ștefan Micle (25 September 1820 – 4 August 1879) was an Imperial Austrian-born and Romanian physicist and chemist.

Born into a poor family in Feleacu, then in Imperial Austrian-ruled Transylvania and now in Cluj County, Romania, he attended primary school in nearby Cluj (Kolozsvár). He went to high school in Cluj, Blaj, and Bistrița, and began work as an apprentice during that time in order to support himself. In 1843, he graduated with high marks from the Cluj Academy of Law (later incorporated in Franz Joseph University). He was an active participant during the Transylvanian Revolution of 1848. In 1850, after receiving a scholarship, he left for the Vienna Polytechnic. There, he proved an able experimenter, and a professor allowed him to live in the physics institute's building. In 1856, invited by August Treboniu Laurian, he came to Iași, where he was named professor of physics and chemistry at the newly founded institute of higher education that evolved from Academia Mihăileană. His hiring at Iași formed part of a wider educational reform initiated by domnitor Grigore Alexandru Ghica in 1849. In 1858, in order to popularize science, he initiated a free physics course which drew large audiences.

When the University of Iași was founded in 1860, he was named full professor in the physics and chemistry department. He taught both subjects until 1878, when the department split and he was left with only the physics section. Together with Petru Poni, he pushed for the establishment of a chemistry laboratory. This began to take shape in the 1864–1865 academic year, when 2000 lei were allocated in the university budget for said purpose. He served as the university's rector between 1867 and 1875. In August 1864, at Cluj, he married Veronica Câmpeanu. His scientific activity primarily consisted of astronomical and meteorological observations. Although his lecture notes are lost, Constantin Istrati reported seeing manuscripts of Micle's on mineralogy; agricultural mechanics; astronomy; botany; zoology; and analytic, inorganic, organic and experimental chemistry. He died in Iași in 1879.
