= Safta Brâncoveanu =

Romanian noble and philanthropist

Safta Brâncoveanu (1776–1857) was a Romanian noblewoman and philanthropist.

== Biography ==
She was the daughter of Teodor Balș and Zoe Rosetti-Balș and married in 1793 to Grigore Brâncoveanu, lord of Craiova. She became famed as a great benefactor of hospitals, monasteries, churches and charitable projects. After being widowed in 1832, she withdrew with her mother to Văratec Monastery, where she became a nun in 1840. In 1835–38, she founded the famous charity hospital Spitalul Brâncovenesc for the poor in Bucharest.

== Canonization ==
On July 1, 2025, Brâncoveanu was canonized by the Romanian Orthodox Church.
