= Mitrea Cocor =

1952 film by Victor Iliu

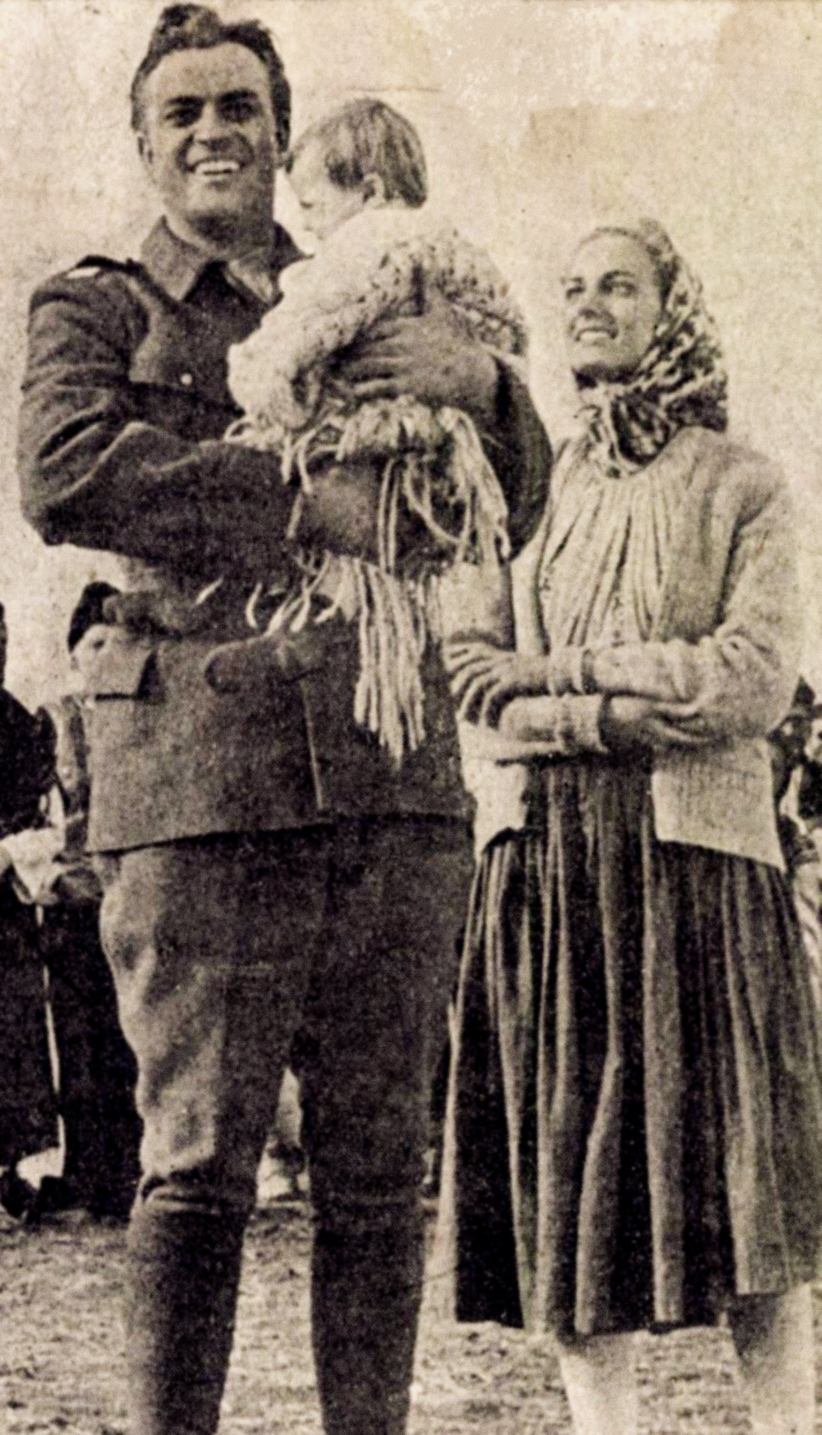
- Mitrea (Septimiu Sever) and his wife (Aurelia Sorescu) in the climactic scene, as they inaugurate a village land reform
- Directed by: Victor Iliu; Marietta Sadova
- Written by: Mihail Sadoveanu (novel)
- Cinematography: Wilfried Ott
- Music by: Sabin Drăgoi
- Release date: 1952
- Country: Romania
- Language: Romanian

Mitrea Cocor is a 1952 Romanian war drama film directed by Victor Iliu and Marietta Sadova. It is based on the 1949 socialist realist novel of the same name by Mihail Sadoveanu. A poor young Romanian goes off to fight during the Second World War, and returns home at the same time as the Red Army advances into the country.

== Cast ==
- Toma Dimitriu
- Constantin Ramadan
- Cornel Rusu
- Marietta Sadova
- Dem Savu
- Septimiu Sever
- Aurelia Sorescu
- Ion Talianu
- Nicolae Tomazoglu
- George Manu
- Andrei Codarcea
- Vasile Lăzărescu
- Nucu Păunescu
- Titus Laptes
- Maria Voluntaru
- Gheorghe Ionescu-Gion
- Ion Henter

== Bibliography ==
- Liehm, Mira & Liehm, Antonín J. The Most Important Art: Eastern European Film After 1945. University of California Press, 1977.
