= Mihail Sadoveanu =

Romanian writer, journalist and politician (1881–1961)

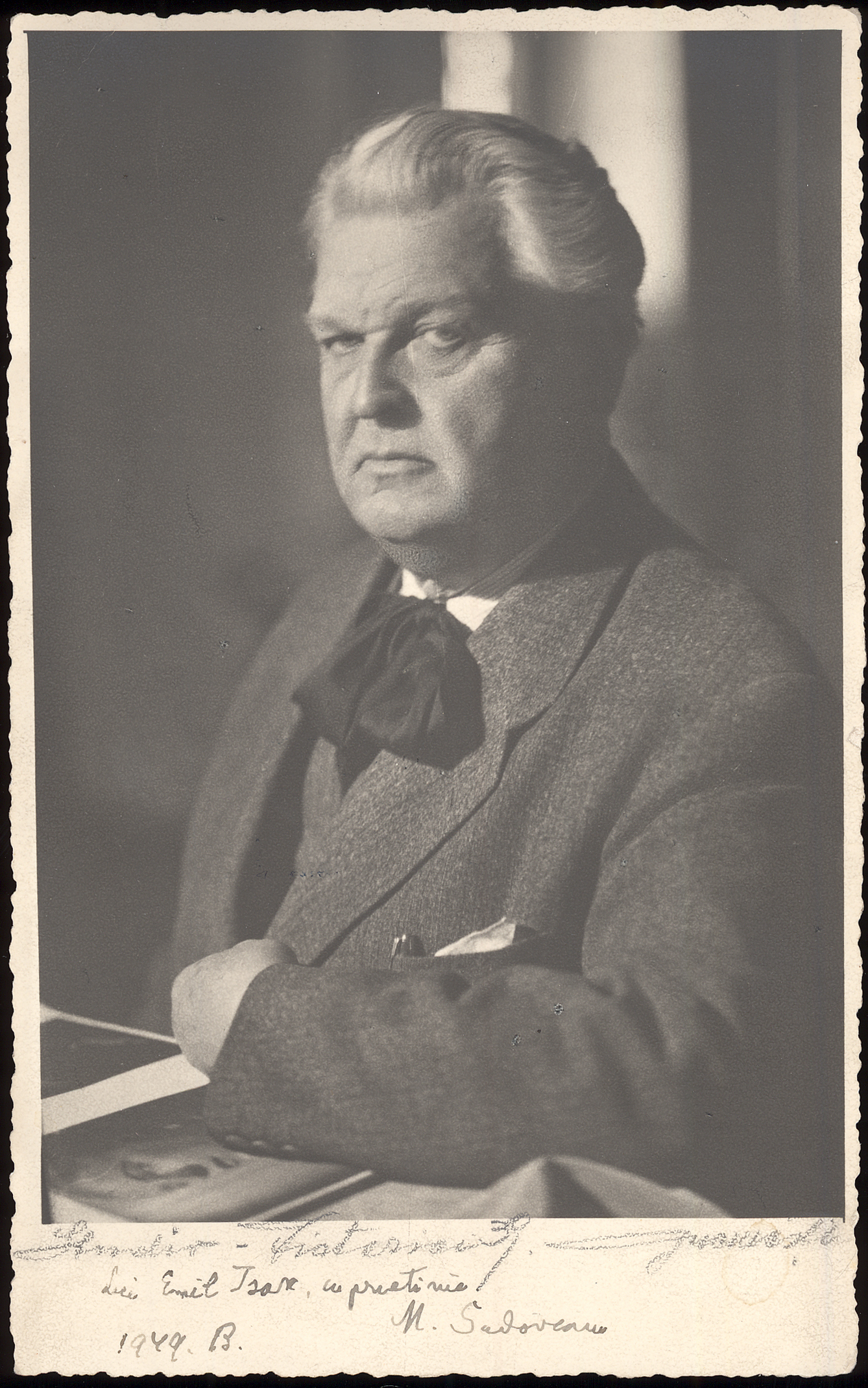
- 1949 photograph
- Born: 5 November 1880; Pașcani, Iași County, Kingdom of Romania
- Died: 19 October 1961 (aged 80); Vânători-Neamț, Neamț County, Romanian People's Republic
- Resting place: Bellu Cemetery, Bucharest, Romania
- Occupations: novelist, short story writer, journalist, essayist, translator, poet, civil servant, activist, politician
- Spouses: Ecaterina Bâlu; Valeria Mitru
- Children: Profira; Paul-Mihu

President of the Presidium of the Great National Assembly of the People's Republic of Romania
- Acting
- In office 7 January 1958 – 11 January 1958 Serving with Anton Moisescu
- Preceded by: Petru Groza
- Succeeded by: Ion Gheorghe Maurer

Head of state of Romania
- Acting
- In office 30 December 1947 – 13 April 1948 Serving with Constantin Ion Parhon, Ștefan Voitec, Gheorghe Stere, Ion Niculi
- Preceded by: Michael I (as King of Romania)
- Succeeded by: Constantin Ion Parhon (as President of the Presidium of the Great National Assembly)

President of the Assembly of Deputies of Romania
- In office 5 December 1946 – 24 February 1948
- Preceded by: Alexandru Vaida-Voevod
- Succeeded by: Gheorghe Apostol (as President of the Great National Assembly of the People's Republic of Romania)

President of the Senate of Romania
- In office 18 June 1931 – 10 June 1932
- Preceded by: Traian Bratu
- Succeeded by: Neculai Costăchescu

Personal details
- Party: Romanian Communist Party (1944–1961)
- Other political affiliations: National Renaissance Front; Agrarian Union Party; National Agrarian Party; National Liberal Party–Brătianu; People's Party
- Awards: Lenin Peace Prize
- Writing career
- Pen name: Mihai din Pașcani, M. S. Cobuz
- Language: Romanian
- Years active: 1892 – 1952
- Genres: historical novel, adventure novel, biographical novel, political novel, psychological novel, crime fiction, memoir, travel literature, nature writing, fantasy, reportage, biography, sketch story, children's literature, lyric poetry
- Movements: Realism, Social realism, Naturalism, Sămănătorul, Poporanism, Socialist realism

Mihail Sadoveanu (Note: Romanian pronunciation: [mihaˈil sadoˈve̯anu]) (occasionally referred to as Mihai Sadoveanu; 5 November 1880 – 19 October 1961) was a Romanian novelist, short story writer, journalist and political figure, who twice served as acting head of state for the Socialist Republic of Romania (1947–1948 and 1958). One of the most prolific Romanian-language writers, he is remembered mostly for his historical and adventure novels, as well as for his nature writing. An author whose career spanned five decades, Sadoveanu was an early associate of the traditionalist magazine Sămănătorul, before becoming known as a Realist writer and an adherent to the Poporanist current represented by Viața Românească journal. His books, critically acclaimed for their vision of age-old solitude and natural abundance, are generally set in the historical region of Moldavia, building on themes from Romania's medieval and early modern history. Among them are Neamul Șoimăreștilor ("The Șoimărești Family"), Frații Jderi ("The Jderi Brothers") and Zodia Cancerului ("Under the Sign of the Crab"). With Venea o moară pe Siret... ("A Mill Was Floating down the Siret..."), Baltagul ("The Hatchet") and some other works of fiction, Sadoveanu extends his fresco to contemporary history and adapts his style to the psychological novel, Naturalism and Social realism.

A traditionalist figure whose perspective on life was a combination of nationalism and Humanism, Sadoveanu moved between right- and left-wing political forces throughout the interwar period, while serving terms in Parliament. Rallying with People's Party, the National Agrarian Party, and the National Liberal Party-Brătianu, he was editor of the leftist newspapers Adevărul and Dimineața, and was the target of a violent far right press campaign. After World War II, Sadoveanu became a political associate of the Romanian Communist Party. He wrote in favor of the Soviet Union and Stalinism, joined the Society for Friendship with the Soviet Union and adopted Socialist realism. Many of his texts and speeches, including the political novel Mitrea Cocor and the famous slogan Lumina vine de la Răsărit ("The Light Arises in the East"), are also viewed as propaganda in favor of communization.

A founding member of the Romanian Writers' Society and later President of the Romanian Writers' Union, Sadoveanu was also a member of the Romanian Academy since 1921 and a recipient of the Lenin Peace Prize for 1961. He was also Grand Master of the Romanian Freemasonry during the 1930s. The father of Profira and Paul-Mihu Sadoveanu, who also pursued careers as writers, he was the brother-in-law of literary critic Izabela Sadoveanu-Evan.

== Biography ==
=== Early years ===
Sadoveanu was born in Pașcani, in western Moldavia. His father's family hailed from the southwestern part of the Old Kingdom, in Oltenia. Their place of origin, Sadova, provided their chosen surname (lit. "from Sadova"), which was adopted by the family only in 1891. Mihail's father was the lawyer Alexandru Sadoveanu (d. 1921), whom literary critic George Călinescu described as "a bearded and well-to-do man"; according to the writer's own notes, Alexandru was unhappy in marriage, and his progressive isolation from public life impacted on the entire family. Mihail's mother, Profira née Ursachi (or Ursaki; d. 1895), hailed from a line of Moldavian shepherds, all of whom, as the writer recalled, had been illiterate. Literary historian Tudor Vianu believes this contrast of regional and social identities played a part in shaping the author, opening him up to a "Romanian universality", but notes that, throughout his career, Sadoveanu was especially connected with his Moldavian roots. Mihail had a brother, also named Alexandru, whose wife was the Swiss-educated literary critic Izabela Morțun (later known as Sadoveanu-Evan, she was the cousin of socialist activist Vasile Morțun). Another one of his brothers, Vasile Sadoveanu, was an agricultural engineer.

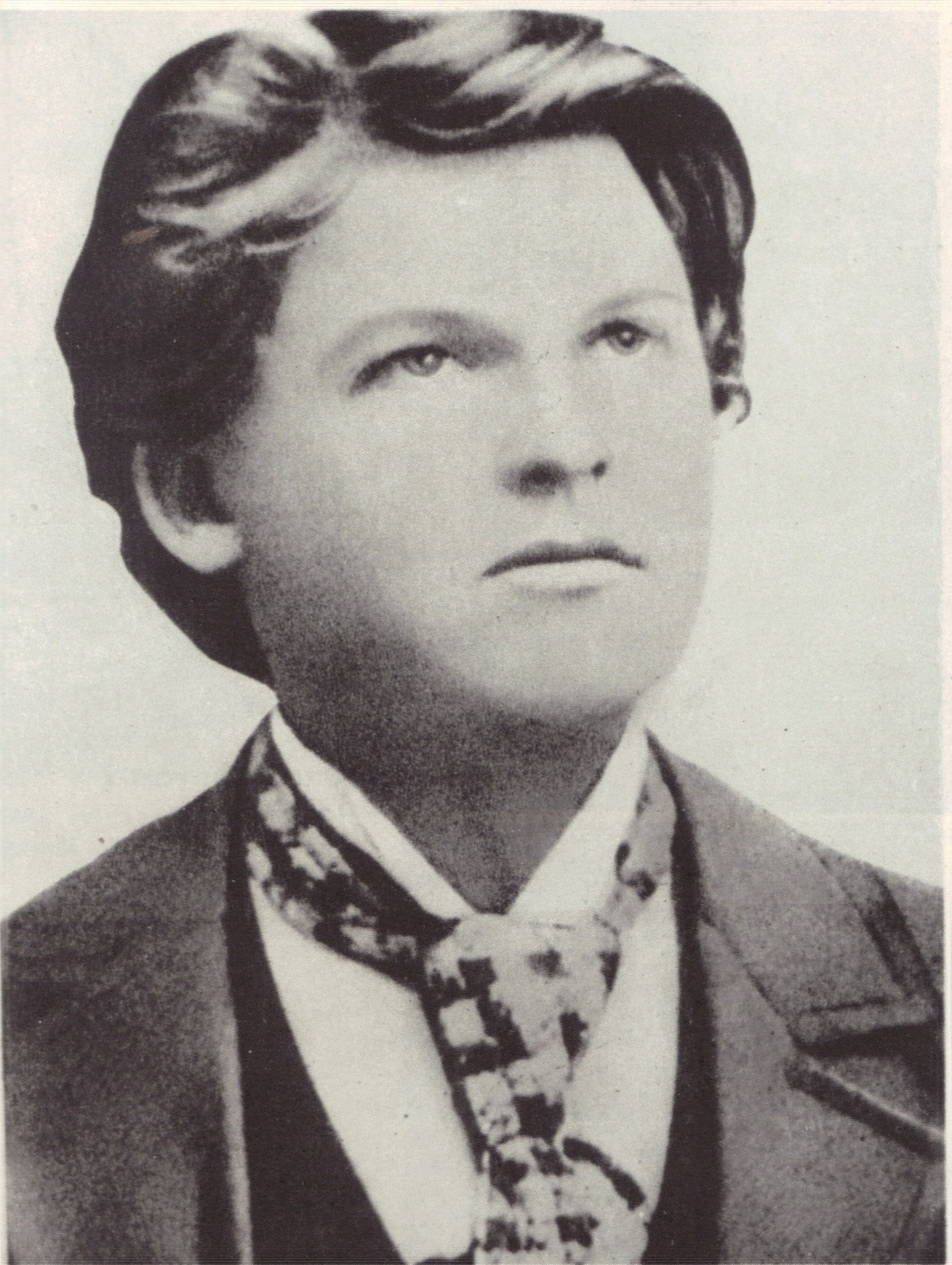
A young Sadoveanu in 1898

Beginning in 1887, Sadoveanu attended primary school in Pașcani. His favorite teacher, a Mr. Busuioc, later served as inspiration for one of his best-known short stories, Domnu Trandafir ("Master Trandafir"). While away from school, young Sadoveanu used much of his spare time exploring his native region on foot, hunting, fishing, or just contemplating nature. He was also spending his vacations in his mother's native Verșeni. During his journeys, Sadoveanu visited peasants, and his impression of the way in which they were relating to authority is credited by critics with having shaped his perspective on society. Shortly after this episode, the young Sadoveanu left to complete his secondary studies in Fălticeni and at the National High School in Iași. While in Fălticeni, he was in the same class as future authors Eugen Lovinescu and I. Dragoslav, but, having lost interest in schoolwork, he failed to get his remove, before eventually graduating top of his class.

=== First literary attempts, marriage and family ===
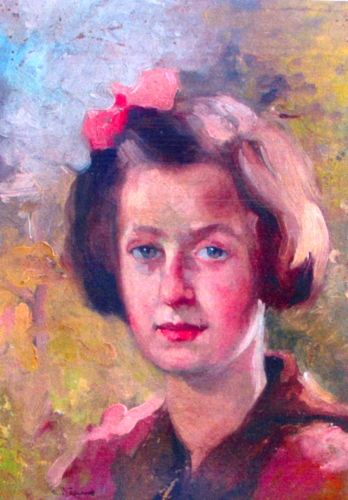
Sadoveanu's daughters, portraits by Aurel Băeșu: Profira,

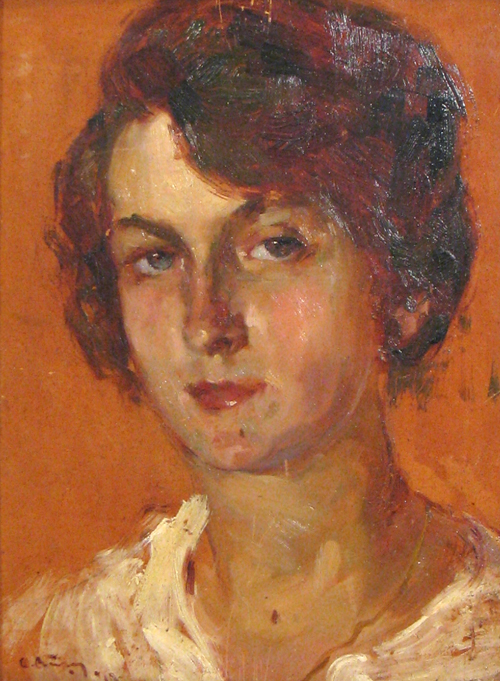
Despina-Lia,

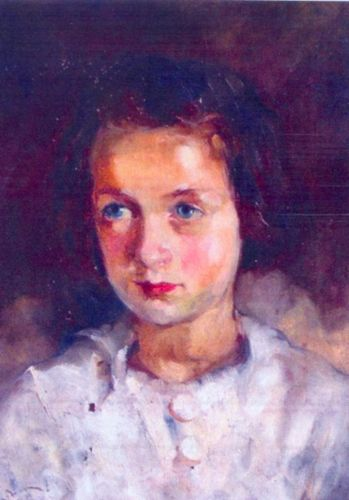
Theodora

In 1896, when he was aged sixteen, Sadoveanu gave thought to writing a monograph on Moldavian Prince Stephen the Great, but his first literary attempts date from the following year. It was in 1897 that a sketch story, titled Domnișoara M din Fălticeni ("Miss M from Fălticeni") and signed Mihai din Pașcani ("Mihai from Pașcani"), was successfully submitted for publishing to the Bucharest-based satirical magazine Dracu. He started writing for Ovid Densusianu's journal Vieața Nouă in 1898. His contributions, featured alongside those of Gala Galaction, N. D. Cocea, and Tudor Arghezi, include another sketch story and a lyric poem. Sadoveanu was however dissatisfied with Densusianu's agenda, and critical of the entire Romanian Symbolist movement for which the review spoke. He ultimately began writing pieces for non-Symbolist magazines such as Opinia and Pagini Literare. In parallel, he founded and printed by hand a short-lived journal, known to researches as either Aurora or Lumea.

Sadoveanu left for Bucharest in 1900, intending to study law at the University's Faculty of Law, but withdrew soon after, deciding to dedicate himself to literature. He began frequenting the bohemian society in the capital, but, following a sudden change in outlook, abandoned poetry and focused his work entirely on Realist prose. In 1901, Sadoveanu married Ecaterina Bâlu, with whom he settled in Fălticeni, where he began work on his first novellas and decided to make his living as a professional writer. His first draft for a novel, Frații Potcoavă ("The Potcoavă Brothers"), came out in 1902, when fragments were published by Pagini Alese magazine under the pseudonym M. S. Cobuz. The following year, Sadoveanu was drafted into the Romanian Land Forces, stationed as a guard near Târgu Ocna, and inspired by the experience to write some of his first social criticism narratives.

After that time, he spent much of his home in the country, where he raised a large family. Initially, the Sadoveanus lived in a house previously owned by celebrated Moldavian raconteur Ion Creangă, before they commissioned a new building, famed for its surrounding Grădina Liniștii ("Garden of Quietude"). He was the father of eleven, among whom were three daughters: Despina, Teodora and Profira Sadoveanu, the latter of whom was a poet and a novelist. Of his sons, Dimitrie Sadoveanu became a painter, while Paul-Mihu, the youngest (born 1920), was author of the novel Ca floarea câmpului... ("Like the Flower of the Field...") which was published posthumously.

=== Sămănătorul, Viața Românească and literary debut ===
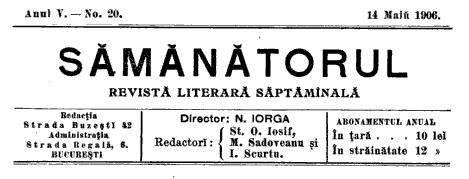
Sămănătorul logo, issue no. 20, dated 14 May 1906. Nicolae Iorga is credited as the editor in chief, Sadoveanu and Ștefan Octavian Iosif are two of the other editors

After receiving an invitation from poet Ștefan Octavian Iosif in 1903, Sadoveanu contributed works to the traditionalist journal Sămănătorul, led at the time by historian and critic Nicolae Iorga. He was by then also a contributor to Voința Națională, a newspaper published by the National Liberal Party and managed by politician Vintilă Brătianu—beginning December of the same year, the paper serialized Șoimii ("The Hawks"), an extended variant of Frații Potcoavă, with an introduction by historian Vasile Pârvan. In 1904, he regained Bucharest, where he became a copyist for the Ministry of Education's Board of Schools, returning to Fălticeni two years later. After 1906, he rallied with the group formed around Viața Românească, which was also joined by his sister-in-law Izabela.

Sămănătorul and Viața Românească, having comparable influence over the literature of Romania, stood for a traditionalist and ruralist approach to art, even though the latter adopted a more left-wing perspective, known as Poporanism. The leading Poporanist ideologue, Garabet Ibrăileanu, became a personal friend of the young writer after inviting him on an excursion down the Râșca River. With his subsequent pieces for Viața Românească, Sadoveanu became especially known as the raconteur of hunting trips, but also sparked controversy when a young woman writer, Constanța Marino-Moscu, accused him of having plagiarized her works in his Mariana Vidrașcu, a serialized novel which was discontinued and later largely forgotten.

1904 was Sadoveanu's effective debut year: he published four separate books, including Șoimii, Povestiri ("Stories"), Dureri înăbușite ("Suppressed Pains") and Crâșma lui Moș Petcu ("Old Man Petcu's Alehouse"). The beginning of a prolific literary career covering more than a half century and of his collaboration with Editura Minerva publishing house, this debut was marked by intense preparation, and drew on literary exercises spanning the previous decade. His Sămănătorul colleague Iorga deemed 1904 "Sadoveanu's Year", while the influential and aging critic Titu Maiorescu, leader of the conservative literary society Junimea, gave a positive review to Povestiri, and successfully proposed it for a Romanian Academy award in 1906. In a 1908 essay, Maiorescu was to list Sadoveanu among Romania's greatest writers. According to Vianu, Maiorescu saw in Sadoveanu and other young writers the triumph of his theory on a "popular" form of Realism, a vision which the Junimist thinker had advocated in his essays from as early as 1882. Sadoveanu later credited Iorga, Maiorescu, and especially so the cultural promoter Constantin Banu and Sămănătorul poet George Coșbuc, with having helped him capture the interest of the public and his peers. He was by then facing adversity from opponents of Sămănătorul, primarily critic Henric Sanielevici and his Curentul Nou review, which published claims that Sadoveanu's volumes, which depicted immoral acts such as adultery and rape, showed that Iorga's program of moral didacticism was hypocritical. As he latter recalled, Sadoveanu was himself upset with some of Iorga's critical judgments regarding his own work, noting that the Sămănătorist doyen had once declared him equal to Vasile Pop (one of Iorga's protegés, and viewed as overrated by Sadoveanu).

The same year, Sadoveanu became one of Sămănătorul's editors, alongside Iorga and Iosif. The magazine, originally a traditionalist mouthpiece founded by Alexandru Vlahuță and George Coșbuc, proclaimed with Iorga its purpose of establishing "a national culture", emancipated from foreign influence. However, according to Călinescu, this ambitious goal was only manifested in a "great cultural influence", as the journal continued to be an eclectic venue which grouped together ruralist traditionalists of the "national tendency" and adherents to the cosmopolitan currents such as Symbolism. Călinescu and Vianu agree that Sămănătorul was, for a large part, a promoter of older guidelines set by Junimea. Vianu also argues that Sadoveanu's contribution to the literary circle was the main original artistic element in its history, and credits Iosif with having accurately predicted that, during a period of literary "crisis", Sadoveanu was the person to provide innovation.

He continued to publish at an impressive rate: in 1906, he again handed down for print four separate volumes. In parallel, Sadoveanu pursued his career as a civil servant. In 1905, he was employed as a clerk by the Ministry of Education, headed by the Conservative Party's Mihail Vlădescu. His direct supervisor was poet D. Nanu, and he had for his colleagues the geographer George Vâlsan and the short story writer Nicolae N. Beldiceanu. Nanu wrote of this period: "It is a clerical packed full with men of letters, no work is being done, people smoke, drink coffee, create dreams, poems and prose [...]." Having interrupted his administrative service, Sadoveanu was again drafted into the Land Forces in 1906, being granted an officer's rank. An already overweight man, he had to march from Probota in Central Moldavia to Bukovina, which caused him intense suffering.

=== 1910s and World War I ===
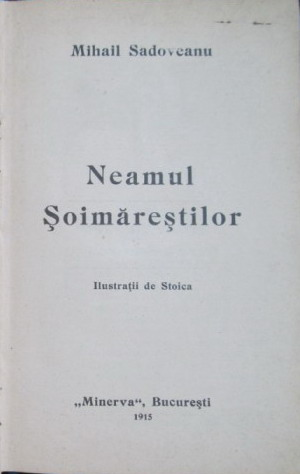
Title page of Neamul Șoimăreștilor in the original 1915 edition "with illustrations by Stoica" (Editura Minerva)

Sadoveanu returned to his administrative job in 1907, the year of the Peasants' Revolt. Kept in office by the National Liberal cabinet of Ion I. C. Brătianu, he served under the reform-minded Education Minister Spiru Haret. Inspired by the bloody outcome of the Revolt, as well as by Haret's moves to educate the peasantry, Sadoveanu reportedly drew suspicion from the Police when he published self-help guides aimed at industrious ploughmen, a brand of social activism which even resulted in a formal inquiry.

Mihail Sadoveanu became a professional writer in 1908–1909, after joining the Romanian Writers' Society, created in the previous year by poets Cincinat Pavelescu and Dimitrie Anghel, and becoming its president in September of that year. The same year, he, Iosif, and Anghel, together with author Emil Gârleanu, set up Cumpăna, a monthly directed against both Ovid Densusianu's eclecticism and the Junimist school (the magazine was no longer in print by 1910). At the time, he became a noted presence among the group of intellectuals meeting in Bucharest's Kübler Coffeehouse.

In 1910, he was also appointed head of the National Theater Iași, a position which he filled until 1919. That year, he translated from the French one of Hippolyte Taine's studies on the genesis of artworks. He resigned his office within the Writers' Society in November 1911, being replaced by Gârleanu, but continued to partake in its administration as a member of its leadership committee and a censor. He was a leading presence at Minerva newspaper, alongside Anghel and critic Dumitru Karnabatt, and also published in the Transylvanian traditionalist journal, Luceafărul.

Sadoveanu was again called under arms during the Second Balkan War of 1913, when Romania confronted Bulgaria. Having reached the rank of Lieutenant, he was stationed in Fălticeni with the 16th Infantry Regiment, after which he spent a short period on the front. He returned to literary life. Becoming good friends with poet and humorist George Topîrceanu, he accompanied him and other writers on cultural tours during 1914 and 1915. The series of writings he published at the time includes the 1915 Neamul Șoimăreștilor.

In 1916–1917, as Romania entered World War I and was invaded by the Central Powers, Sadoveanu stayed in Moldavia, the only part of Romania's territory still under the state's authority (see Romanian Campaign). The writer oscillated between the Germanophilia of his Viața Românească friends, the stated belief that war was misery and the welcoming of Romania's commitment to the Entente Powers. At the time, he was reelected President of the Writers' Society, a provisional mandate which ended in 1918, when Romania signed the peace with the Central Powers, and, as Army reservist, edited the Entente's regional propaganda outlet, România. He was joined by Topîrceanu, who had just been released from a POW camp in Bulgaria, and with whom he founded the magazine Însemnări Literare. Sadoveanu subsequently settled in the Iași neighborhood of Copou, purchasing and redecorating the villa known locally as Casa cu turn ("The House with a Tower"). In the 19th century, it had been the residence of politician Mihail Kogălniceanu, and, during the war, hosted composer George Enescu. During that period, he collaborated with leftist intellectual Vasile Morțun and, together with him and Arthur Gorovei, founded and edited the magazine Răvașul Poporului.

=== Creative maturity and early political career ===
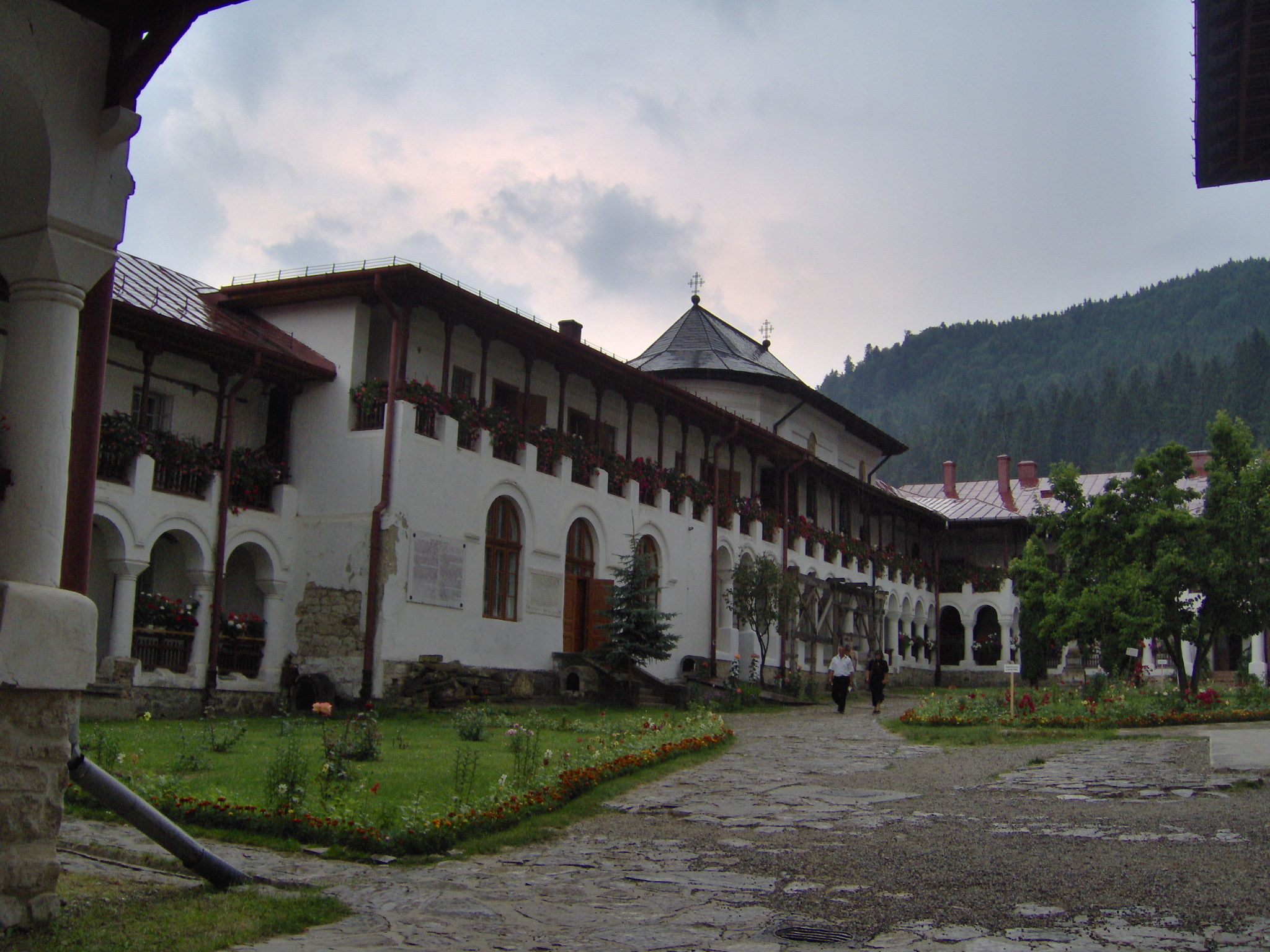
Agapia Monastery, one of Sadoveanu's favorite retreats

In 1921, Sadoveanu was elected a full member of the Romanian Academy; he gave his reception speech in front of the cultural forum two years later, structuring it as a praise of Romanian folklore in general and folkloric poetry in particular. At the time, he renewed his contacts with Viața Românească: with Garabet Ibrăileanu and several others, he joined its interwar nucleus, while the review often featured samples of his novels (some of which were originally published in full by its publishing venture). His house was by then host to many cultural figures, among whom were writers Topîrceanu, Gala Galaction, Otilia Cazimir, Ionel and Păstorel Teodoreanu, and Dimitrie D. Pătrășcanu, as well as conductor Sergiu Celibidache. He was also close to a minor socialist poet and short story author, Ioan N. Roman, whose work he helped promote, to the aristocrat and memoirist Gheorghe Jurgea-Negrilești, and to a satirist named Radu Cosmin.

Despite his health problems, Sadoveanu frequently traveled throughout Romania, notably visiting local sights which inspired his work: the Romanian Orthodox monasteries of Agapia and Văratec, and the Neamț Fortress. After 1923, together with Topîrceanu, Demostene Botez and other Viața Românească affiliates, he also embarked on a series of hunting trips. He was charmed in particular by the sights he discovered during a 1927 visit to the Transylvanian area of Arieș. The same year, he also visited the Netherlands, which he reached by means of the Orient Express. His popularity continued to grow: in 1925, 1929 and 1930 respectively, he published his critically acclaimed novels Venea o moară pe Siret..., Zodia Cancerului and Baltagul, and his 50th anniversary was celebrated at a national level. In 1930, Sadoveanu, Topîrceanu and the schoolteacher T. C. Stan wrote and edited a series of primary school textbooks.

In 1926, after a period of indecision, Sadoveanu rallied with the People's Party, where his friend, the poet Octavian Goga, was a prominent activist. He then rallied with Goga's own National Agrarian Party. During the general election of 1927, he won a seat in the Chamber for Bihor County, in Transylvania, holding a seat in the Senate for Iași County after the 1931 suffrage. Under Nicolae Iorga's National Peasants' Party cabinet of the period, Sadoveanu was President of the Senate. The choice was motivated by his status as "a cultural personality". Around that date, he was affiliated with the National Liberal Party-Brătianu, a right-wing party inside the liberal current, who stood in opposition to the main National Liberal group. In parallel, he began contributing to the left-wing daily Adevărul.

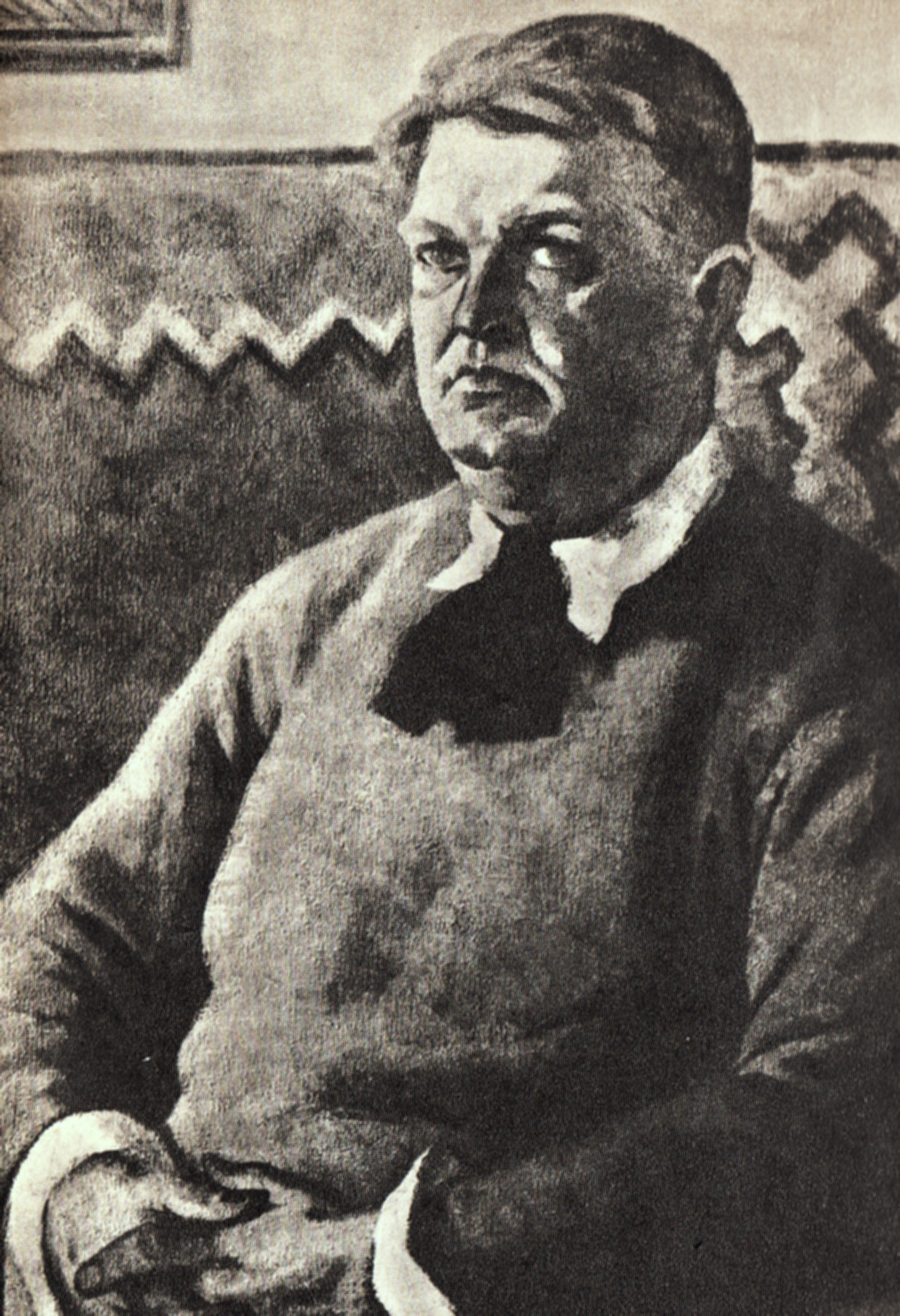
Portrait of Sadoveanu by Ștefan Dimitrescu, 1928

Sadoveanu was by then affiliated with the Freemasonry, as first recorded by the organization in 1928, but was probably a member since 1926 or 1927. Reaching the 33rd degree within the organization and overseeing the Masonic Lodge Dimitrie Cantemir of Iași, he was elected Grand Master of the National Union of Lodges in 1932, thus replacing the vacating George Valentin Bibescu. There subsequently occurred a split between Bibescu and Sadoveanu's supporters, aggravated by their publicized conflict with a third group, that of Ioan Pangal—splits which ended after some three years, when Sadoveanu marginalized both of his opponents, without however earning legitimate recognition from the Grand Orient de France. By 1934, he was recognized as Grand Master of the United Romanian Freemasonry, which regrouped all major local Lodges.

=== Late 1930s and World War II ===
He was publishing new works at a regular rate, culminating in the first volume of his historical epic Frații Jderi, which saw print in 1935. In 1936, the writer accepted the honorary chairmanship of Adevărul and its morning edition, Dimineața. During that time, he was involved in a public dispute with the far right and fascist press, replying to their attacks in several columns. Affiliates of the radical right organized public burnings of his volumes. The scandal prolonged itself over the following years, with Sadoveanu being supported by his friends in the literary community. Among them was Topîrceanu, who was at the time hospitalized, and whose expression of support was made shortly before his death to liver cancer. In September 1937, as a statement of solidarity and appreciation, the University of Iași conferred Sadoveanu the title of doctor honoris causa.

Mihail Sadoveanu withdrew from politics in the late 1930s and early 1940s, as Romania came to be led by successive right-wing dictatorships, he offered a measure of support to King Carol II and his National Renaissance Front, which attempted to block the more radically fascist Iron Guard from power. He was personally appointed a member of the reduced corporatist Senate by Carol. In 1940, the official establishment Editura Fundațiilor Regale published the first volume of his Opere ("Works"). Sadoveanu kept a low profile under the Iron Guard's Nazi-allied National Legionary regime. After Conducător Ion Antonescu overthrew the Guard during the Legionary Rebellion and established his own fascist regime, the still-apolitical Sadoveanu was more present in public life, and lectured on cultural subjects for the Romanian Radio. After publishing the final section of his Frații Jderi in 1942, Sadoveanu again retreated to the countryside, in his beloved Arieș area, where he had built himself a chalet and a church; this seclusion produced his Povestirile de la Bradu-Strâmb ("Bradu-Strâmb Stories"). During those years, the sixty-year-old writer met Valeria Mitru, a much younger feminist journalist, whom he married after a brief courtship.

In August 1944, Romania's King Michael Coup toppled Antonescu and switched sides in the war, rallying with the Allies. As a Soviet occupation began at home, Romanian troops fought alongside the Red Army on the European theater. Paul-Mihu Sadoveanu was killed in action in Transylvania on 22 September. During the same months, Sadoveanu was a candidate for the Writers' Society presidency, but, in what has been read as proof of a rivalry within the Freemasonry, was defeated by Victor Eftimiu. Later that year, the 40th anniversary of Mihail Sadoveanu's debut was celebrated with a special ceremony at the academy and Tudor Vianu's speech, offered as a retrospective of his colleague's entire work.

=== Communist system and political rise ===
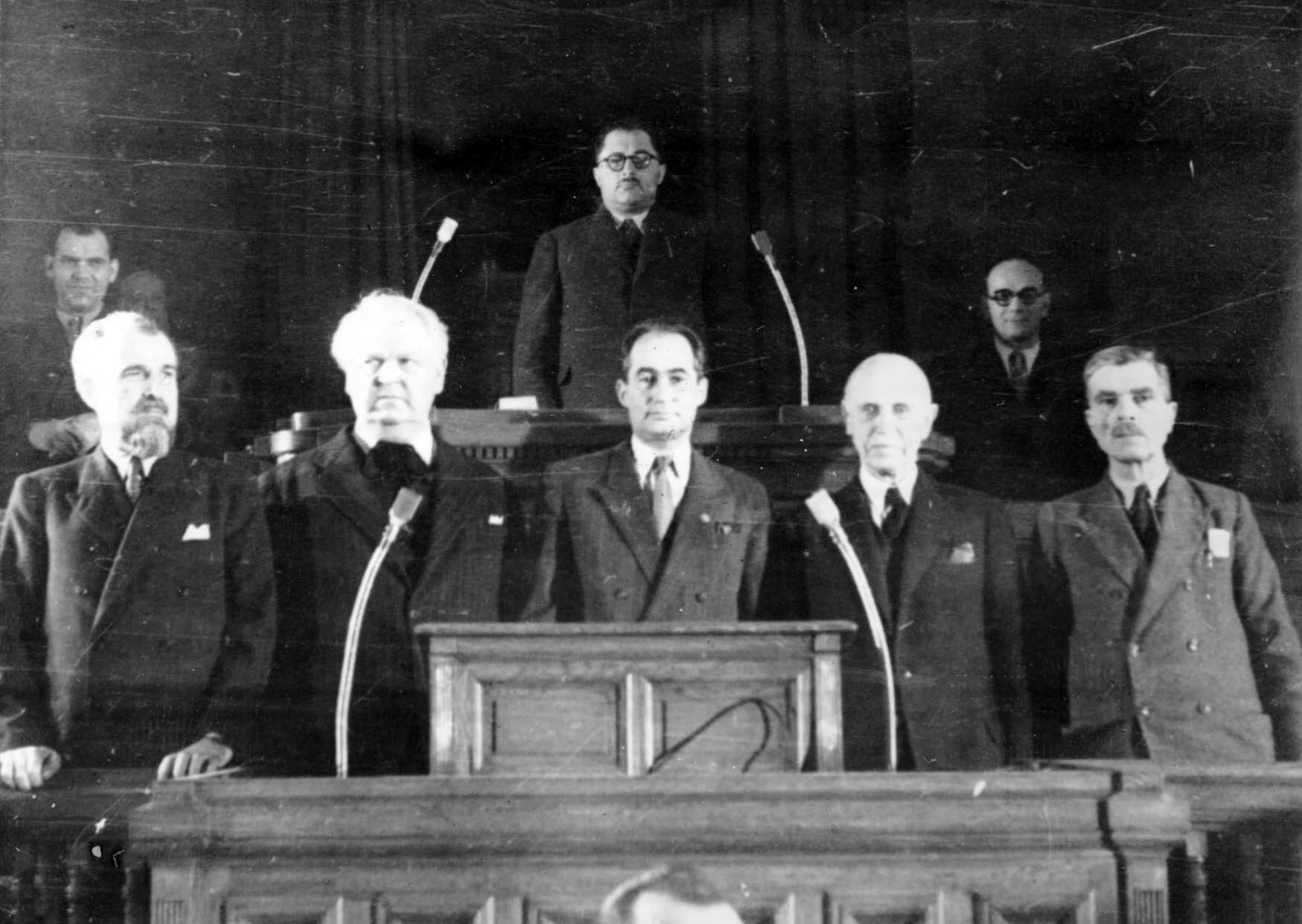
The collective Romanian Presidency in 1948. From left: Ștefan Voitec, Sadoveanu, Gheorghe Stere, Constantin Ion Parhon, Ion Niculi

After the Soviet-backed advent of the Communist system in Romania, Sadoveanu supported the new authorities, and turned from his own version of Realism to officially-endorsed Socialist realism (see Socialist realism in Romania). This was also the start of his association with the Soviet-sponsored Romanian Society for Friendship with the Soviet Union (ARLUS), which was led by biologist and physician Constantin Ion Parhon. Having served as a host to official Soviet envoys Andrey Vyshinsky and Vladimir Kemenov during their late 1944 visits, he soon after became president of the ARLUS "Literary and Philosophical Section" (seconded by Mihai Ralea and Perpessicius). In February 1945, he joined Parhon, Enescu, linguist Alexandru Rosetti, composer George Enescu, biologist Traian Săvulescu and mathematician Dimitrie Pompeiu in a protest against the cultural policies of Premier Nicolae Rădescu and his cabinet, one in a series of moves to discredit the non-communist Rădescu and make him leave power. With Ion Pas, Gala Galaction, Horia Deleanu, Octav Livezeanu and N. D. Cocea, Sadoveanu edited the association's weekly literary magazine Veac Nou after June 1946.

Sadoveanu's literary and political change became known to the general public in March 1945, when he lectured about Soviet leader Joseph Stalin at a conference hall in Bucharest. Part of a conference cycle, his speech was famously titled Lumina vine de la Răsărit, which soon became synonymous with the attempts to improve the image of Stalinism in Romania. ARLUS would issue the text of his conference as a printed volume later in the year. Also in 1945, Sadoveanu journeyed to the Soviet Union together with some of his fellow ARLUS members—among them biologists Parhon and Săvulescu, sociologist Dimitrie Gusti, linguist Iorgu Iordan, and mathematician Simion Stoilow. Invited by the Soviet Academy of Sciences to attend the 220th anniversary of its foundation, they also visited research institutes, kolhozy, and day care centers, notably meeting with Nikolay Tsitsin, an agronomist favored by Stalin. After his return, he wrote other controversial texts and gave lectures which offered ample praise to the Soviet system. That year, the ARLUS enterprise Editura Cartea Rusă also published his translation of Ivan Turgenev's A Sportsman's Sketches.

During the rigged election of that year, Sadoveanu was a candidate for the Communist party-organized Bloc of Democratic Parties (BPD) in Bucharest, winning a seat in the newly unified Parliament of Romania. In its first-ever session (December 1946), the legislative body elected him its president. He was at the time residing in Ciorogârla, having been awarded a villa previously owned by Pamfil Șeicaru, a journalist whose support for fascist regimes had made him undesirable, and who had moved out of Romania. The decision was viewed as evidence of political corruption by the opposition National Peasants' Party, whose press deemed Sadoveanu the "Count of Ciorogârla".

In 1948, after Romania's King Michael I was overthrown by the BPD-member parties and the communist regime officially established, Sadoveanu rose to the highest positions ever granted to a Romanian writer, and received significant material benefits. In 1947–1948, he was, alongside Parhon, Ștefan Voitec, Gheorghe Stere, and Ion Niculi, a member of the Presidium of the People's Republic, which was elected by the BPD-dominated legislative. He also kept his seat at the academy, which at the time was undergoing a communist-led purge, and, with several other pro-Soviet intellectuals, was voted in the Academy Presidium.

=== Final years, illness and death ===
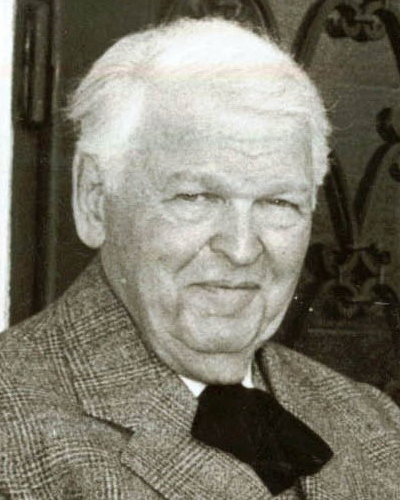
Photograph of the aging Sadoveanu

After the Writers' Society was restructured as the Romanian Writers' Union in 1949, Sadoveanu became its Honorary President. In 1950, he was named President of the Writers' Union, replacing Zaharia Stancu. According to writer Valeriu Râpeanu, this last appointment was a sign of Stancu's marginalization after he had been excluded from the Romanian Communist Party, while the Writers' Union was actually controlled by its First Secretary, the communist poet Mihai Beniuc. Sadoveanu and Beniuc were reelected at the Union's first Congress (1956). In the meanwhile, Sadoveanu published several Socialist realist volumes, among which was Mitrea Cocor, a controversial praise of collectivization policies. First published in 1949, it earned Sadoveanu the first-ever State Prize for Prose.

Throughout the period, Sadoveanu was involved in major communist-endorsed cultural campaigns. Thus, in June 1952, he presided over the academy's Scientific Council, charged with modifying the Romanian alphabet, at the end of which the letter â was discarded, and replaced everywhere with î (a spelling Sadoveanu is alleged to have already shown preference for in his early works). In March 1953, soon after Stalin's death, he led discussions within the Writers' Union, confronting his fellow writers with the new Soviet cultural directives as listed by Georgy Malenkov, and reacting against young authors who had not discarded the since-condemned doctrines of proletkult. The author was also becoming involved in the Eastern Bloc's peace movement, and led the National Committee for the Defense of Peace at a time when the Soviet Union was seeking to portray its Cold War enemies as warmongers and the sole agents of nuclear proliferation. He also represented Romania to the World Peace Council, and received its International Peace Prize for 1951. As a parliamentarian, Sadoveanu stood on the committee charged with elaborating the new republican constitution, which, in its final form, reflected both Soviet influence and the assimilation of Stalinism into Romanian political discourse. In November 1955, shortly after turning 75, he was granted the title of "Hero of Socialist Labor". After 1956, when the regime announced that it had embarked on a limited version of De-Stalinization, it continued to recommend Mihail Sadoveanu as one of its prime cultural models.

Having donated Casa cu turn to the state in 1950, he moved back to Bucharest, where he owned a house near the Zambaccian Museum. From 7 to 11 January 1958, Sadoveanu, Ion Gheorghe Maurer and Anton Moisescu were acting Chairmen of the Presidium of the Great National Assembly, which again propelled him to a position as titular head of state. His literary stature but also his political allegiance earned him the Soviet Lenin Peace Prize, which he received shortly before his death.

After a long illness marked by a stroke which impaired his speech and left him almost completely blind, Sadoveanu was cared for by a staff of physicians supervised by Nicolae Gh. Lupu and reporting to the Great National Assembly. The Sadoveanus withdrew to Neamț region, where they lived in a villa assigned to them by the state and located near the Voividenia hermitage and the locality of Vânători-Neamț, being visited regularly by literary and political friends, among them Alexandru Rosetti. Mihail Sadoveanu died there at 9 AM on 19 October 1961, and was buried at Bellu cemetery, in Bucharest. His successor as President of the Writers' Union was Beniuc, elected during the Congress of January 1962.

Following her husband's death, Valeria Sadoveanu settled in proximity to the Văratec Monastery, where she set up an informal literary circle and Orthodox prayer group, notably attended by literary historian Zoe Dumitrescu-Bușulenga and by poet Ștefana Velisar, and dedicated herself to protecting the community of nuns. She survived Mihail Sadoveanu by over 30 years.

== Literary contributions ==
=== Context ===
Often seen as the leading author of his generation, and generally viewed as one of the most representative Romanian writers, Mihail Sadoveanu was also believed to be a first-class story-teller, and received praise especially for his nature writing and his depictions of rural landscapes. An exceptionally prolific author by Romanian standards, he published over a hundred individual volumes (120 according to the American magazine Time). His contemporaries tended to place Sadoveanu alongside Liviu Rebreanu and Cezar Petrescu—for all the differences in style between the three figures, the interwar public saw them as the "great novelists" of the day. Critic Ovid Crohmălniceanu describes their activity, altogether focused on depicting the rural world but diverging in bias, as one sign that the Romanian interwar itself was exceptionally effervescent, while Romanian-born American historian of literature Marcel Cornis-Pope sees Sadoveanu and Rebreanu as their country's "two most important novelists of the first half of the twentieth century". In 1944, Tudor Vianu spoke of Sadoveanu as "the most significant writer Romanians [presently] have, the first among his equals."

While underlining his originality in the context of Romanian literature and among the writers standing for "the national tendency" (as opposed to the more cosmopolitan modernists), George Călinescu also noted that, through several of his stories and novels, Sadoveanu echoed the style of his predecessors and contemporaries Ion Luca Caragiale, Ioan Alexandru Brătescu-Voinești, Emil Gârleanu, Demostene Botez, Otilia Cazimir, Calistrat Hogaș, I. A. Bassarabescu and Ionel Teodoreanu. Also included among the "national tendency" writers, Gârleanu was for long seen as Sadoveanu's counterpart, and even, Călinescu writes, "undeservedly upstaged" him. Cornis-Pope also writes that Sadoveanu's epic is a continuation of "the national narrative" explored earlier by Nicolae Filimon, Ioan Slavici and Duiliu Zamfirescu, while literary historians Vianu and Z. Ornea note that Sadoveanu also took inspiration from the themes and genres explored by Junimist author Nicolae Gane. In his youth, Sadoveanu also admired and collected the works of N. D. Popescu-Popnedea, a prolific and successful author of almanacs, historical novels and adventure novels. Later, his approach to Realism was also inspired by his reading of Gustave Flaubert and especially Nikolai Gogol. Both Sadoveanu and Gane were also indirectly influenced by Wilhelm von Kotzebue, the 19th century Imperial Russian diplomat and author of the Romanian-themed story Laskar Vioresku.

In Vianu's assessment, Sadoveanu's work signified an artistic revolution within the local Realist school, comparable to the adoption of perspective by the visual artists of the Renaissance. Mihail Sadoveanu's interest in the rural world and his views on tradition were subjects of debate among the modernists. The modernist doyen Eugen Lovinescu, who envisaged an urban literature in tune with European tendencies, was one of Sadoveanu's most notorious critics. However, Sadoveanu was well received by Lovinescu's adversaries within the modernist camp: Perpessicius and Contimporanul editor Ion Vinea, the latter of whom, in search for literary authenticity, believed in bridging the gap between the avant-garde and folk culture. This opinion was shared by Swedish literary historian Tom Sandqvist, who sees Sadoveanu's main point of contact with modernism was his interest in the pagan elements and occasional absurdist streaks of local folklore. In the larger dispute about national specificity, and partly in response to Vinea's claim, modernist poet and essayist Benjamin Fondane argued that, as a sign Romanian culture was tributary to those it had come into contact with, "Sadoveanu's soul can be easily reduced to the Slavic soul".

=== Characteristics ===
Sadoveanu's personality and experience played a major part in shaping his literary style. After his 1901 marriage, Mihail Sadoveanu adopted what Călinescu deemed "patriarchal" lifestyle. The literary historian noted that he took a personal interest in educating his many children, and that this also implied "making use of a whip". An Epicurean, the writer was a homemaker, an avid hunter and fisherman, and a chess aficionado. Recognized, like his epigramist colleague Păstorel Teodoreanu, as a man of refined culinary tastes, Sadoveanu cherished Romanian cuisine and Romanian wine. The lifestyle choices were akin to his literary interests: alongside the secluded and rudimentary existence of his main characters (connected by Călinescu with the writer's supposed longing for "regressions to the patriarchal times"), Sadoveanu's work is noted for its imagery of primitive abundance, and in particular for its lavish depictions of ritualistic feasts, hunting parties and fishing trips.

Călinescu opined that the value of such descriptions within individual narratives grew with time, and that the author, once he had discarded lyricism, used them as "a means for the senses to enjoy the fleshes and the forms that nature offers man." He added that Sadoveanu's aesthetics could be said to recall the art of the Golden Age in Holland: "One could almost say that Sadoveanu rebuilds in present day Moldavia [...] the Holland of wine jugs and kitchen tables covered in venison and fish." Vianu also argued that Sadoveanu never abandoned himself to purely aesthetic descriptions, and that, although often depicted with Impressionistic means, nature is assigned a specific if discreet role within the plot lines, or serves to render a structure. The traditionalist Garabet Ibrăileanu, referring to Sadoveanu's poetic nature writing, even declared it to have "surpassed nature." At the other end, the modernist Eugen Lovinescu specifically objected to Sadoveanu's depiction of a primordial landscape, arguing that, despite adopting Realism, his rival was indebted to Romanticism and subjectivity. Lovinescu's attitude, critic Ion Simuț notes, was partly justified by the fact that Sadoveanu never truly parted with the traditionalism of Sămănătorul. In 1962, Time also commented that his style was "curiously dated" and recalled not Sadoveanu's generation, but that of Leo Tolstoy and Ivan Turgenev, "although he has nothing like the power or skill of any of them." For Călinescu and Vianu too, Sadoveanu is a creator with seemingly Romantic tastes, which recall those of François-René de Chateaubriand. Unlike Lovinescu, Vianu saw these traits as "not at all detrimental to the balance of [Sadoveanu's] art."

Seen by literary critic Ioan Stanomir as marked by "volubility", and thus contrasting with his famously taciturn and seemingly embittered nature, the form of Romanian used by Mihail Sadoveanu, particularly in his historical novels, was noted for both its use of archaisms and the inventive approach to the Romanian lexis. Often borrowing plot lines and means of expression from medieval and early modern Moldavian chroniclers such as Ion Neculce and Miron Costin, the author creatively intercalates several local dialects and registers of speech, moving away from a mere imitation of the historical language. Generally third-person narratives, his books often make little or no dialectal difference between the speech used by the story-teller and the character's voices. According to Călinescu, Sadoveanu displays "an enormous capacity of authentic speech", similar to that of Caragiale and Ion Creangă. The writer himself recorded his fascination with the "eloquence" of rudimentary orality, and in particular with the speech of Rudari Roma he encountered during his travels. Building on observations made by several critics, who generally praised the poetic qualities of Sadoveanu's prose, Crohmălniceanu spoke in detail about the Moldavian novelist's role in reshaping the literary language. This particular contribution was first described early in the 20th century, when Sadoveanu was acclaimed by Titu Maiorescu for having adapted his writing style to the social environment and the circumstances of his narratives. Vianu however notes that Sadoveanu's late writings tend to leave more room for neologisms, mostly present in those parts where the narrator's voice takes distance from the plot.

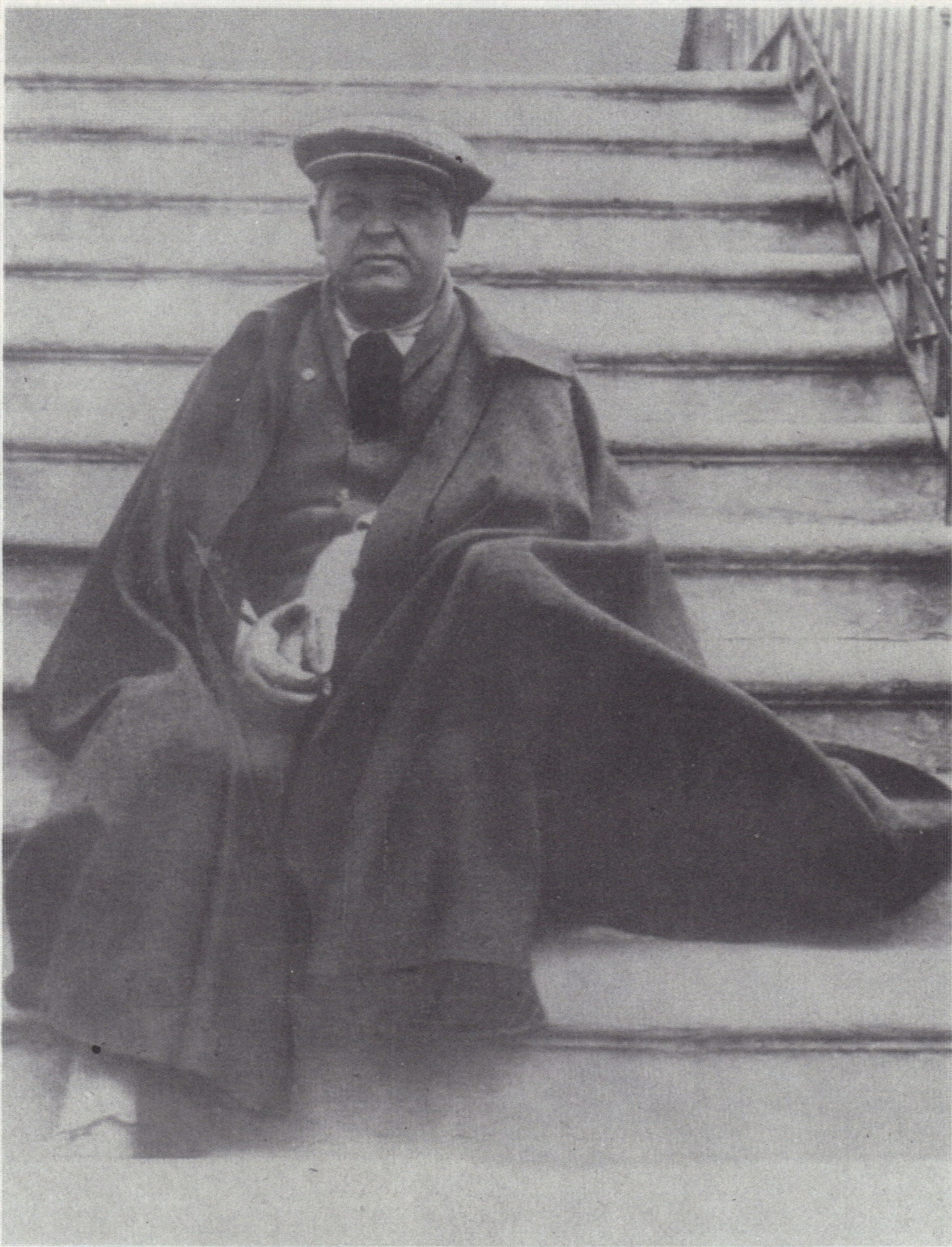
Sadoveanu on the steps of his house in Copou

Another unifying element in Sadoveanu's creation is his recourse to literary types. As early as 1904, Maiorescu praised the young raconteur for accurately depicting characters in everyday life and settings. Tudor Vianu stressed that, unlike most of his Realist predecessors, Sadoveanu introduced an overtly sympathetic view of the peasant character, as "a higher type of human, a heroic human". He added: "Simple, in the sense that they are moved by a few devices [which] coincide with the fundamental instincts of mankind, [they] are, in general, mysterious." In this line, Sadoveanu also creates images of folk sages, whose views on life are of a Humanist nature, and often depicted in contrast with the rationalist tenets of Western culture. Commenting on this aspect, Sadoveanu's friend George Topîrceanu believed that Sadoveanu's work transcended the "more intellectual [and] more artificial" notion of "types", and that "he creates [...] humans." The main topic of his subsequent work, Sandqvist argues, was "an archaic world where the farmers and the landlords were free men with equal rights" (or, according to Simuț, "a utopia of archaic heroism").

Thus, Călinescu stresses, Sadoveanu's work seems to be the monolithic creation through which "a single man" reflects "a single, universal nature, inhabited by a single type of man", and which echoes a similar vision of archaic completeness as found in the literature of poet Mihai Eminescu. The similarity in vision with Eminescu's "nostalgia, return, protest, demand, aspiration toward a [rural] world [he has] left" was also proposed by Vianu, while Topîrceanu spoke of "the paradoxical discovery that [Sadoveanu] is our greatest poet since Eminescu." Mihail Sadoveanu also shaped his traditionalist views on literature by investigating Romanian folklore, which he recommended as a source of inspiration to his fellow writers during his 1923 speech at the Romanian Academy. In Călinescu's view, Sadoveanu's outlook on life was even mirrored in his physical aspect, his "large body, voluminous head, his measured shepherd-like gestures, his affluent but prudent and monologic speech [and] feral indifference; his eyes [...] of an unknown race." His assessment of the writer as an archaic figure, bluntly stated in a 1930 article ("I believe him to be very uncultured"), was contrasted by other literary historians: Alexandru Paleologu described Sadoveanu as a prominent intellectual figure, while his own private notes show that he was well-read and acquainted with the literatures of many countries. Often seen as a spontaneous writer, Sadoveanu nevertheless took pains to elaborate his plots and research historical context, keeping most records of his investigations confined to his diaries.

=== Debut ===
The writer's debut novel, Povestiri, was celebrated for its accomplished style, featuring early drafts of all themes he developed upon later in life. However, Călinescu argued, some of the stories in the volume were still "awkward", and showed that Sadoveanu had problems in outlining epics. The pieces mainly feature episodes in the lives of boyars (members of Moldavia's medieval aristocracy), showing the ways in which they relate to each other, to their servants, and to their country. In one of the stories, titled Cântecul de dragoste ("The Love Song"), Sadoveanu touches on the issue of slavery, depicting the death of a Rom slave who is killed by his jealous master, while in Răzbunarea lui Nour ("Nour's Revenge"), a boyar refuses to make his peace with God until his son's death is avenged. Other fragments deal solely with the isolated existence of villagers: for example, in Într-un sat odată ("Once, in a Village"), a mysterious man dies in a Moldavian hamlet, and the locals, unable to discover his identity, sell his horse. The prose piece Năluca ("The Apparition") centers on the conjugal conflict between two old people, both of whom attempt to hide the shame of their past. George Călinescu notes that, particularly in Năluca, Sadoveanu begins to explore the staple technique of his literary contributions, which involves "suggesting the smolder of passions [through] a contemplative breath in which he evokes a static element: landscapes or set pieces from nature."

Sadoveanu's subsequent collection of short stories, Dureri înăbușite, builds on the latter technique and takes his work into the realm of social realism and naturalism (believed by Călinescu to have been borrowed from either the French writer Émile Zola or from the Romanian Alexandru Vlahuță). For Călinescu, this choice of style brought "damaging effects" on Sadoveanu's writings, and made Dureri înăbușite "perhaps the poorest" of his collections of stories. In Lovinescu's view, Sadoveanu's move toward naturalism did not imply the necessary recourse to objectivity. The pieces focus on dramatic moments of individual existences. In Lupul ("The Wolf"), an animal is chased and trapped by a group of peasants; the eponymous character in Ion Ursu leaves his village to become a proletarian, and succumbs to alcoholism; the indentured laborer in Sluga ("The Servant") is unable to take revenge on his cruel employer at the right moment; in Doi feciori ("Two Sons"), a boyar comes to feel affection for his illegitimate son, whom he has nonetheless reduced to a lowly condition.

In 1905, Sadoveanu also published Povestiri din război ("Stories from the War"), which compose scenes from the lives of Romanian soldiers fighting in the War of 1878. Objecting to a series of exaggerations in the book, Time nevertheless noted that Sadoveanu "sometimes had the writing skill to make compelling even quite traditional reactions to old-fashioned war". It concluded: "Sadoveanu's sketches have the virtues—and the vices—of old hunting prints and the romantically mannered battle scenes of the 19th century."

=== Early selections of major themes ===
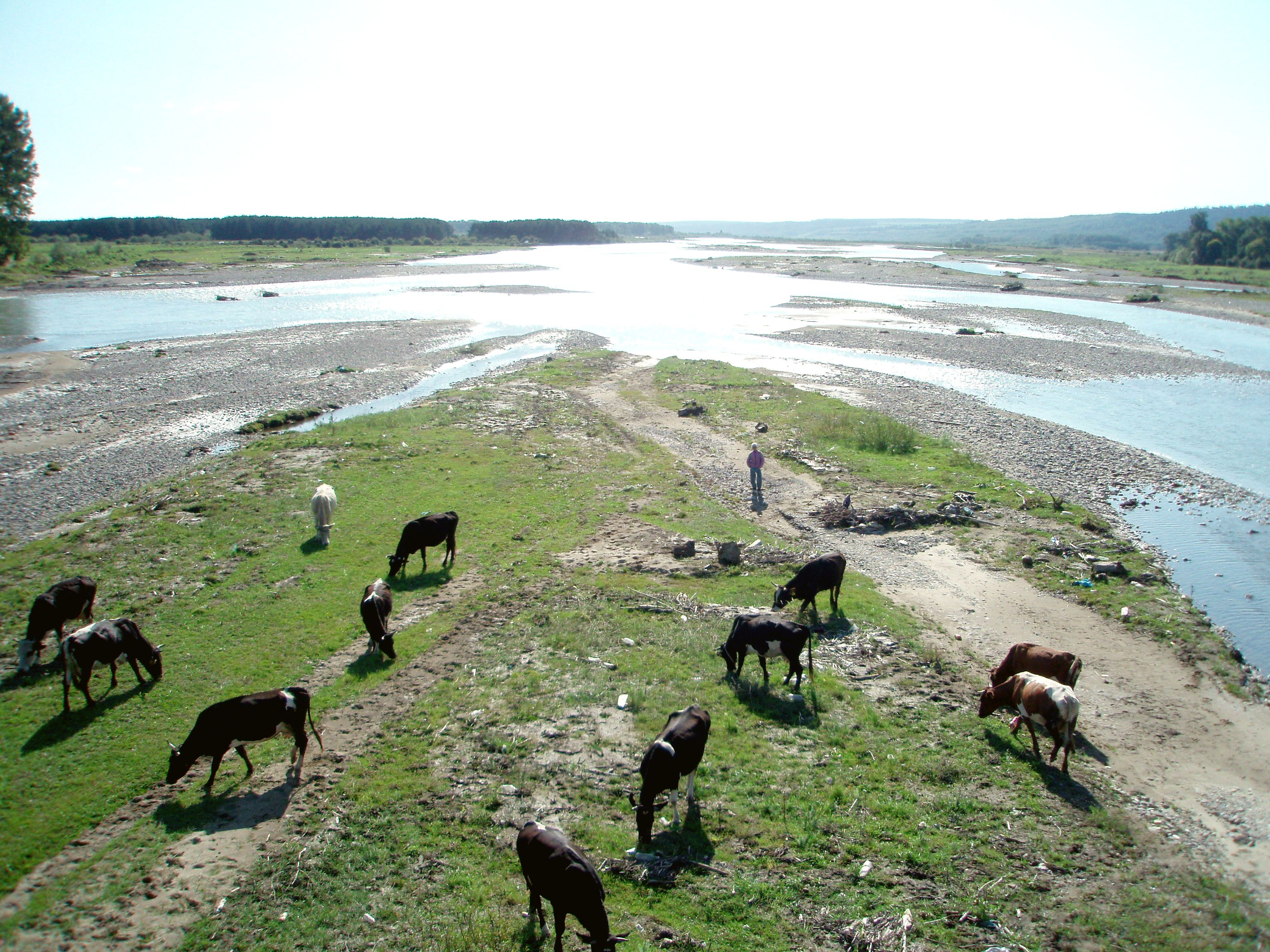
The Moldova Valley, setting of Sadoveanu's Crâșma lui Moș Petcu

Sadoveanu renounces this grim perspective on life in his volume Crâșma lui Moș Petcu, where he returns to a depiction of rural life as unchanged by outside factors. Petcu's establishment, located on the Moldova Valley, is a serene place, visited by quiet and subdued customers, whose occasional outburst of violence are, according to Călinescu, "dominated by slow, stereotypical mechanics, as is with people who can only accommodate within them a single drama." The literary critic celebrated Crâșma lui Moș Petcu for its depictions of nature, whose purpose is to evoke "the indifferent eternity" of conflicts between the protagonists, and who, at times, relies "on a vast richness of sounds and words." He did however reproach the writer "a certain monotony", arguing that Sadoveanu came to use such techniques in virtually all his later works.

However, Sadoveanu's stories of the period often returned to a naturalistic perspective, particularly in a series of sketch stories and novellas which portray the modest lives of Romanian Railways employees, of young men drafted into the Romanian Land Forces, of Bovaryist women who playfully seduce adolescents, or of the provincial petite bourgeoisie. At times, they confront the morals of barely literate people with the stern authorities: a peasant obstinately believes that the 1859 union between Wallachia and Moldavia was meant to ensure the supremacy of his class; a young lower-class woman becomes the love interest of a boyar but chooses a life of freedom; and a Rom deserts from the Army after being told to bathe. In La noi, la Viișoara ("At Our Place in Viișoara"), the life of an old man degenerates into bigotry and avarice, to the point where he makes his wife starve to death. Sadoveanu's positive portrayal of hajduks as fundamentally honest outlaws standing up to feudal injustice, replicates stereotypes found in Romanian folklore, and is mostly present in some of the stories through (sometimes recurrent) heroic characters: Vasile the Great, Cozma Răcoare, Liță Florea etc. In the piece titled Bordeenii (roughly, "The Mud-hut Dwellers"), he shows eccentrics and misanthropes presided upon by the dark figure of Sandu Faliboga, brigands who flee all public authority and whom commentators have likened to settlers of the Americas. Lepădatu, an unwanted child, speaks for the entire group: "What could I do [...] wherever there are big fairs and lots of people? I'd have a better time with the cattle; it is with them that I have grown up and with them that I get along." Romanticizing the obscure events of early medieval history in Vremuri de bejenie ("Roving Times", 1907), Sadoveanu sketches the improvised self-defense of a refugee community, their last stand against nomadic Tatars.

In reference to the stories in this series, Călinescu stresses that Sadoveanu's main interest is in depicting men and women cut away from civilization, who view the elements of Westernization with nothing more than "wonderment": "Sadoveanu's literature is the highest expression of the savage instinct." In later works, the critic believed, Sadoveanu moved away from depicting isolation as the escape of primitives into their manageable world, but as "the refinement of souls whom civilization has upset." These views are echoed by Ovid Crohmălniceanu, who believes that, unlike other Romanian Realists, Sadoveanu was able to show a peasant society that was not merely the prey of modern corruption or historical oppression, but rather refusing all contacts with the wider world—even to the point of Luddite-like hostility in front of new objects. Some of the early stories, Crohmălniceanu argues, do follow the moralizing Sămănătorist pattern, but part with it when they refuse to present the countryside in "idyllic" fashion, or when they adopt a specific "mythical realism".

Sadoveanu began his career as a novelist with more in-depth explorations into subjects present in his stories and novellas. At the time, Crohmălniceanu stresses, he was being influenced by the naturalism of Caragiale (minus the comedic effect), and by his own experience growing up in characteristically underdeveloped Moldavian cities and târguri (somewhat similar to the aesthetic of boredom, adopted in poetry by George Bacovia, Demostene Botez or Benjamin Fondane). Among his first works of the kind is Floare ofilită ("Wizened Flower"), where a simple girl, Tincuța, marries a provincial civil servant, and finds herself deeply unhappy and unable to enrich her life on any level. Tincuța, seen by Călinescu as one of Sadoveanu's "savage" characters, only maintains urban refinement when persuading her husband to return for supper, but, according to Crohmălniceanu, is also a credible witness to the "small-mindedness" of "bourgeois" environments. A rather similar plot is built for Însemnările lui Neculai Manea ("The Recordings of Neculai Manea"), where the eponymous character, an educated peasant, experiences two unhappy romantic affairs before successfully courting a married woman who, although grossly uncultured, makes him happy. Apa morților ("The Dead Men's Water") is about a Bovaryist woman who discards lovers over imprecise feelings of dissatisfaction, finding refuge in the monotonous countryside. Călinescu noted that such novels were "usually less valuable than direct accounts", and deemed Însemnările lui Neculai Manea "without literary interest"; in Ovid Crohmălniceanu's view, the same story presents relevant detail on professional and intellectual failure.

Praised by its commentators, the short novel Haia Sanis (1908) shows the eponymous character, a Jewish woman who throws herself into the arms of a local Gentile, although she knows him to be a seducer. Călinescu, who wrote with admiration about how the subject dissimulated pathos into "technical indifference", notes that the erotic rage motivating Haia has drawn "well justified" comparisons with Jean Racine's tragedy Phèdre. Crohmălniceanu believes Haia Sanis to be "perhaps [Sadoveanu's] best novella", particularly since the "wild beauty" Haia has to overcome at once antisemitism, endogamy and shame, before dying "in terrible pain" during a botched abortion. Sadoveanu's work of the time also includes Balta liniștii ("Tranquillity Pond"), where Alexandrina, pushed into an arranged marriage, has a belated and sad revelation of true love. In other sketch stories, such as O zi ca altele ("A Day like Any Other") or Câinele ("The Dog"), Sadoveanu follows Caragiale's close study of suburban banality.

=== Hanu Ancuței, Șoimii and Neamul Șoimăreștilor ===
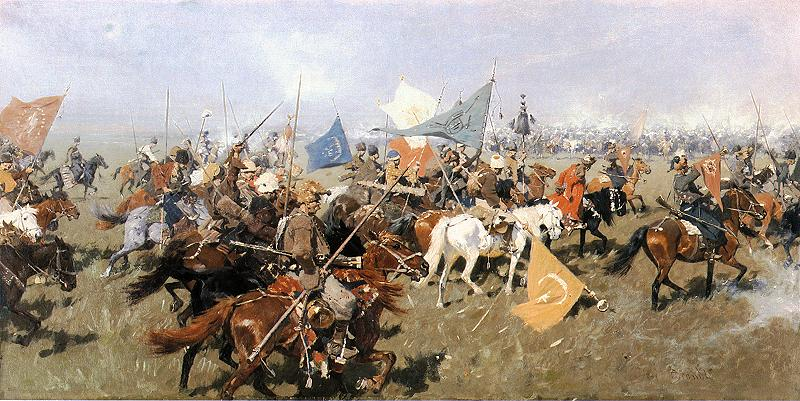
Return of the Cossacks by 19th century Polish painter Józef Brandt, taking its inspiration from 17th century Cossack raids

The novella Hanu Ancuței ("Ancuța's Inn"), described by George Călinescu as a "masterpiece of the jovial idyllicism and barbarian subtlety", and by Z. Ornea as the first evidence of Sadoveanu's "new age", is a frame story in the line of medieval allegories such as Giovanni Boccaccio's Decameron and Geoffrey Chaucer's Canterbury Tales. It retells the stories of travelers meeting in the eponymous inn. Much of the story deals with statements of culinary tastes and shared recipes, as well as with the overall contrast between civilization and rudimentary ways: in one episode of the book, a merchant arriving from the Leipzig Trade Fair bemuses the other protagonists when he explains the more frugal ways and the technical innovations of Western Europe. Sadoveanu applied the same narrative technique in his Soarele în baltă ("The Sun in the Waterhole"), which, Călinescu argues, displays "a trickier style."

In Șoimii, Sadoveanu's first historical novel, the main character is Nicoară Potcoavă, a late 16th-century Moldavian nobleman who became Hetman of the Zaporozhian Cossacks and Prince of Moldavia. The narrative, whose basic lines had been drawn by Sadoveanu in his adolescent years, focuses on early events in Nicoară's life, building on the story according to which he and his brother Alexandru were the brothers of Prince Ioan Vodă cel Cumplit, whose execution by the Ottomans they tried to avenge. The text also follows their attempt to seize and kill Ieremia Golia, a boyar whose alleged betrayal had led to Prince Ioan's capture, and whose daughter Ilinca becomes the brothers' prisoner. This story as well features several episodes where the focus is on depicting customary feasts, as well as a fragment where the Potcoavăs and their Zaporozhian Cossack allies engage in binge drinking. Glossing over several years in Nicoară's life, and culminating in his seizure of the throne, the narrative shows his victory against pretender Petru Șchiopul and Golia, and the price he has to pay for his rise. Alexandru, who falls in love with Ilinca, unsuccessfully asks for the captured Golia not to be killed. Following the murder, both brothers become embittered and renounce power. Călinescu described Șoimii novel as "still awkward", noting that Sadoveanu was only beginning to experiment with the genre.

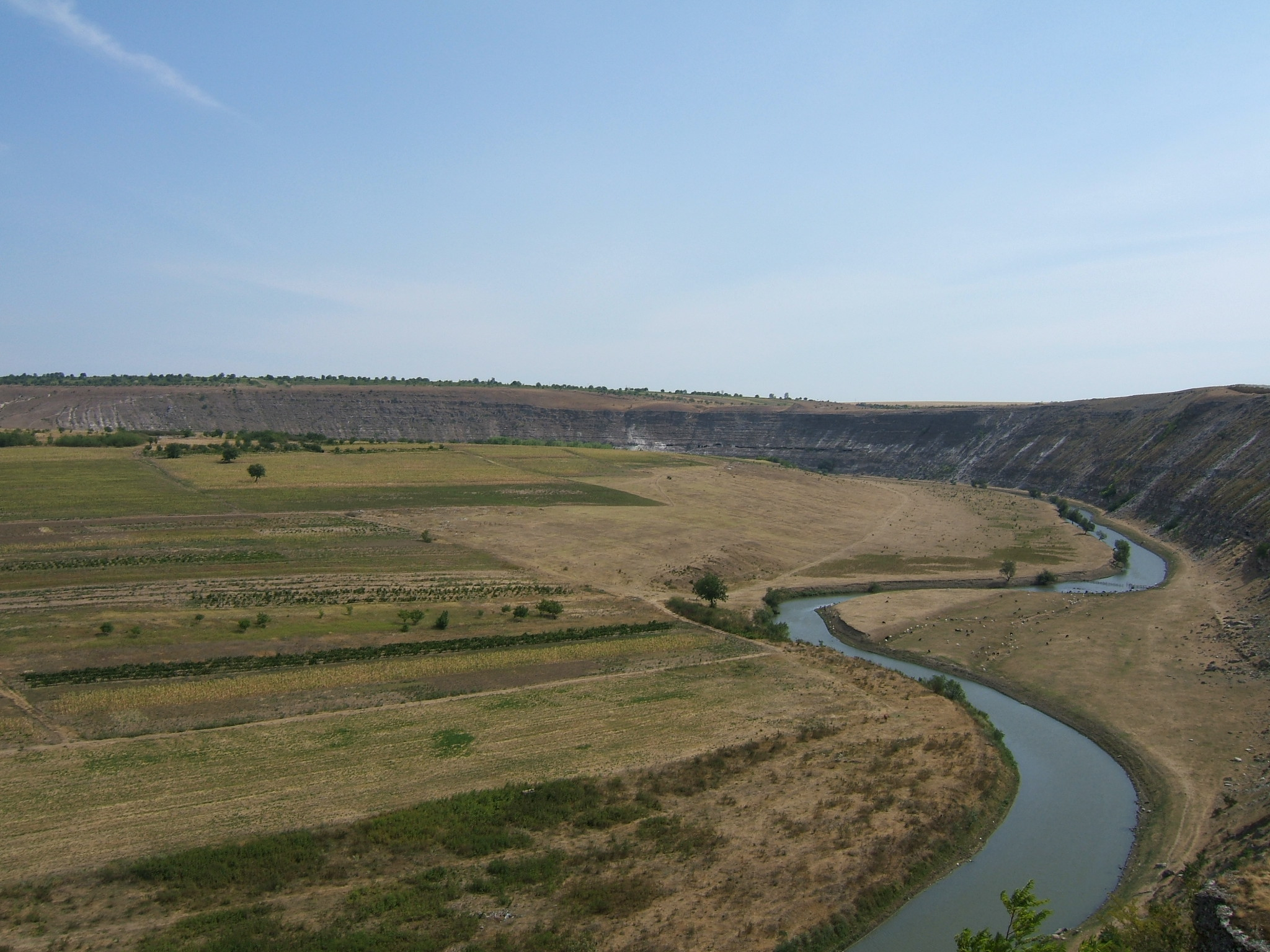
View from the area around Orhei, where much of Neamul Șoimăreștilor takes place

The 1915 Neamul Șoimăreștilor is a Bildungsroman centered on the coming of age of one Tudor Șoimaru. The protagonist, born a free peasant in Orhei area, fights alongside Ștefan Tomșa in the 1612 battles to capture the Moldavian throne. After participating in the capture of Iași, he returns home and helps local boyar Stroie in recovering his daughter, Magda, who had been kidnapped by Cossacks. Șoimaru, who feels for Magda, is however enraged by news that her father has forced his community into serfdom. Trying to deal with his internal conflict, he travels into Poland–Lithuania, where he discovers that Stroie is plotting against Tomșa, while Magda, who is in love with a szlachta nobleman, scorns his affection. He returns a second time to Orhei, marries into his social group, and plots revenge on Stroie by again rallying with Ștefan Tomșa. Following Tomșa's defeat, he again loses the lands of his ancestors, as Stroie returns home to celebrate his victory and have the Șoimarus put to death. Unexpectedly warned of this by Magda, Tudor manages to turn the tide: he and his family destroy Stroie's manor, killing the master but allowing Magda to escape unharmed. In Călinescu's view, the novel is "somewhat more consistent from an epic perspective", but fails to respect the conventions of the adventure novel it sets out to replicate. The critic, who deemed Magda's courtship by Tudor "sentimental", argued that the book lacks "the richness and unpredictable nature of the love intrigue"; he also objected to the depiction of Tudor as indecisive and inadequate for a heroic role. However, Ovid Crohmălniceanu argued that the suddenness of Tudor's sentimental commitments was characteristic for the "peasant soul" as observed by Sadoveanu.

=== Zodia Cancerului and Nunta Domniței Ruxandra ===
Zodia Cancerului, Sadoveanu's later historical novel, is set late in the 17th century, during the third rule of Moldavian Prince Gheorghe Duca, and is seen by Călinescu as "of a superior artistic level." The plot centers on a conflict between Duca and the Ruset boyars: the young Alecu Ruset, son of the deposed Prince Antonie, is spared persecution on account of his good relations with the Ottomans, but has to live under close watch. Himself a tormented, if cultured and refined, man, Alecu falls in love with Duca's daughter Catrina, whom he attempts to kidnap. The episode, set to coincide with the start of a major social crisis, ends with Alecu's defeat and killing on Duca's orders.

In the background, the story depicts the visit of an Abbé de Marenne, a Roman Catholic priest and French envoy, who meets and befriends Ruset. Their encounter is another opportunity for Sadoveanu to show the amiable but incomplete exchange between the mentalities of Western and Eastern Europe. In various episodes of the novel, de Marenne shows himself perplexed by the omnipresent wilderness of underpopulated Moldavia, and in particular by the abundance of resources this provides. In one paragraph, seen by George Călinescu as a key to the book, Sadoveanu writes: "[De Marenne's] curious eye was permanently satisfied. Here was a desolation of solitudes, one that his friends in France could not even guess existed, no matter how much imagination they had been gifted with; for at the antipode of civilization one occasionally finds such things that have remained unchanged from the onset of creation, preserving their mysterious beauty."

In a shorter novel of the period, Sadoveanu explored the late years of Vasile Lupu's rule over Moldavia, centering on the marriage of Cossack leader Tymofiy Khmelnytsky and Lupu's daughter, Ruxandra. Titled Nunta Domniței Ruxandra ("Princess Ruxandra's Wedding"), it shows the Cossacks' brutal celebration of the event around the court in Iași, depicting Tymofiy himself as an uncouth, violent and withdrawn figure. The narrative then focuses on the Battle of Finta and the siege of Suceava, through which a Wallachian-Transylvanian force repelled the Moldo-Cossack forces and, turning the tide, entered deep into Moldavia and placed Gheorghe Ștefan on the throne. Sadoveanu also invents a love story between Ruxandra and the boyar Bogdan, whose rivalry with Tymofiy ends in the latter's killing. While Călinescu criticized the plot as being over-detailed, and the character studies as incomplete, Crohmălniceanu found the intricate depiction of boyar customs to be a relevant part of Sadoveanu's "vast historical fresco." In both Zodia Cancerului and Nunta Domniței Ruxandra, the author took significant liberties with the historical facts. In addition to Tymofiy's death at the hands of Bogdan, the latter narrative used invented or incorrect names for some of the personages, and portrays the muscular, mustachioed, Gheorghe Ștefan as thin and bearded; likewise, in Zodia Cancerului, Sadoveanu invents the character Guido Celesti, who stands in for the actual Franciscan leader of Duca's Iași, Bariona da Monte Rotondo.

=== Frații Jderi, Venea o moară pe Siret... and Baltagul ===
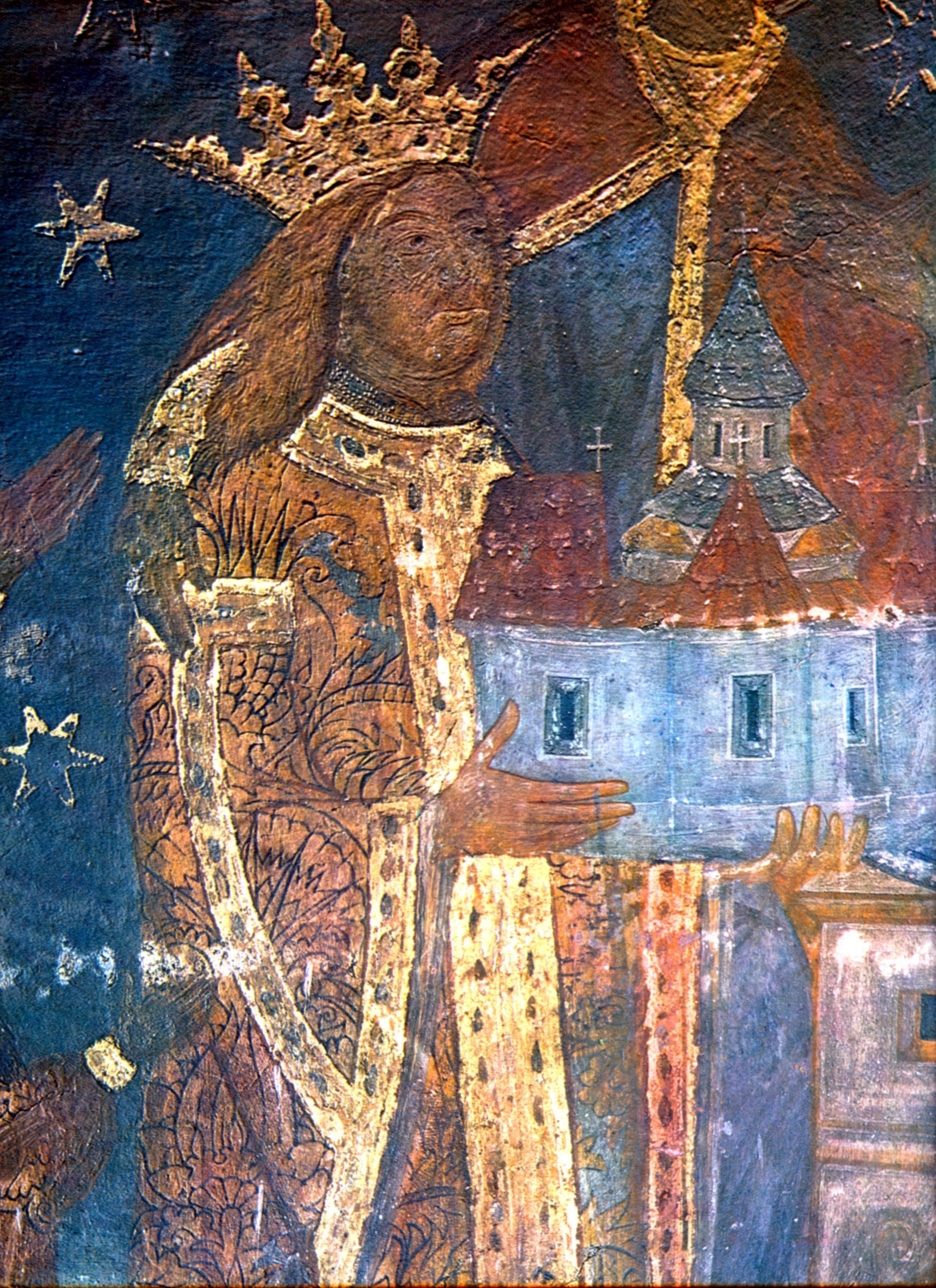
Stephen the Great in a Voroneț Monastery mural

With Frații Jderi, Sadoveanu's fresco of Moldavian history maintains its setting, but moves back in time to the 15th century rule of Prince Stephen the Great. Writing in 1941, before its final part was in print, Călinescu argued that the novel was part of Sadoveanu's "most valuable work", and noted "the maturity of its verbal means." In the first volume, titled Ucenicia lui Ionuț ("Ionuț's Apprenticeship"), the eponymous Jderi brothers, allies of Stephen and friends of his son Alexandru, fight off the enemies of their lord on several occasions. In what is the start of a Bildungsroman, the youngest Jder, Ionuț Păr-Negru, consumed by love for Lady Nasta, who was kidnapped by Tatars. He goes to her rescue, only to find out that she had preferred suicide to a life of slavery. Călinescu, who believed the volumes show Sadoveanu's move to the consecrated elements of adventure novels, called them "remarkable", but stressed that the narrative could render "the feeling of stumbling, of a languishing flow", and that the dénouement was "rather depressing". The second book in the series (Izvorul alb, "The White Water Spring") intertwines the life of the Jderi brothers with that of Stephen's family: the ruler weds the Byzantine princess Mary of Mangop, while Simion Jder falls for Marușca, who is supposedly Stephen's illegitimate daughter. The major episodes in the narrative are Marușca's kidnapping by a boyar, her captivity in Jagiellon Poland, and her rescue at the hands of the Jderi. The 1942 conclusion of the cycle, Oamenii Măriei-sale ("His Lordship's Men"), the brothers are shown defending their ancestral rights and their lord against the Ottoman invader and ambivalent boyars, and crushing the former at the Battle of Vaslui.

The Jderi books, again set to the background of primitivism and natural abundance, also feature episodes of intense horror. These, Călinescu proposes, are willingly depicted "with an indolent complacency", as if to underline that the slow pace and monumental scale of history give little importance to personal tragedies. The same commentator notes a difference between the role nature plays in the first and second volumes: from serene, the landscape becomes hostile, and people are shown fearing earthquakes and droughts, although contemplative depictions of euphoria play a central part in both writings. The meeting between the wider world and the immobile local tradition surfaces in Frații Jderi as well: a messenger is shown wondering how the letter he brought could talk to the addressee; when she is supposed to encounter strange men, Marușca requests to be allowed to "shy away" in another room; a secondary character, claiming precognition, prepares his own funeral.

For the 1925 Venea o moară pe Siret..., Sadoveanu received much critical acclaim. The boyar Alexandru Filotti falls in love with a miller's daughter, Anuța, whom he educates and introduces to high society. The beautiful young lady is also courted by Filotti's son Costi and by the peasant Vasile Brebu—in the end, overwhelmed by jealousy, Brebu kills the object of his affection. George Călinescu writes that the good reception was not fully deserved, claiming that the novel is "colorless", that it was merely based on the writer's early stories, and that it failed in its goal of depicting "crumbling boyardom".

In Baltagul (1930), Sadoveanu merged psychological techniques and a pretext borrowed from crime fiction with several of his major themes. Written in just 30 days on the basis of previous drafts, the condensed novel shows Vitoria Lipan, the widow of a murdered shepherd, following in her husband's tracks to discover his killer and avenge his death. Accompanied by her son, and using for a guide the shepherd's dog, Vitoria discovers both the body and the murderer, but, before she can take revenge, her dog jumps on the man and bites into his neck. By means of this plot line, Sadoveanu also builds a fresco of transhumance and traces its ancestral paths, taking as a source of inspiration one of the best-known poems in local folklore, the ballad Miorița. Vitoria's sheer determination is the central aspect of the volume. Călinescu, who ranks the book among Sadoveanu's best, praises its "remarkable artistry" and "unforgettable dialogues", but nonetheless writes that Lipan's "detective-like" search and a "stubbornness" are weak points in the narrative. Crohmălniceanu declares Baltagul one of the "capital works" in world literature, proposing that, on its own, it manages to reconstruct "an entire shepherding civilization"; Cornis-Pope, who rates the book as "Sadoveanu's masterpiece", also notes that it "restated the theme of crime and punishment".

=== Main travel writings and memoirs ===
Before the 1940s, Sadoveanu also became known as a travel writer. His contributions notably include accounts of his hunting trips: Țara de dincolo de negură ("The Land beyond the Fog"), and one dedicated to the region of Dobruja (Priveliști dobrogene, "Dobrujan Sights"). Călinescu wrote that they both comprised "pages of great beauty". Țara de dincolo..., primarily showing recluse men in real-life symbiosis with the wilderness, also attention for its sympathetic depiction of the Hutsuls, a minority Slavic-speaking population, as an ancient tribe threatened by cultural assimilation. Sadoveanu's other travelogues include the reportage Oameni și locuri ("People and Places") and an account of his trips into Bessarabia (Drumuri basarabene, "Bessarabian Roads"). He also collected and commented upon the memoirs of other avid hunters (Istorisiri de vânătoare, "Hunting Stories").

A noted writing in this series was Împărăția apelor ("The Realm of Waters"). It forms a detailed and contemplative memoir of his journeys as a fisherman, and, according to Crohmălniceanu, one of the most eloquent proofs of Sadoveanu's "permanent and intimate correspondence with nature." Călinescu saw the text as a "fantastic vision of the entire aquatic universe", merging a form of pessimism similar to Arthur Schopenhauer's with a "calm kief" (cannabis-induced torpor), and as such illustrating "the great joy of participating in the transformations of matter, of eating and allowing oneself to be eaten." Sadoveanu also contributed an account of his travels into the Netherlands, Olanda ("Holland"). It provides insight into his preoccupation with the meeting of civilization and wilderness: upset by what he called "the [Dutch] rampancy of cleanliness", the writer confesses his perplexity at coming face to face with a contained and structured natural world, and details his own temptation to go "against the current". One of Sadoveanu's main conclusions is that Holland lacks in "true and lively wonders". Sadoveanu also sporadically wrote memoirs of his early life career, such as Însemnări ieșene ("Recordings from Iași"), which deals with the period during which he worked for Viața Românească, a book about the Second Balkan War (44 de zile în Bulgaria, "44 Days in Bulgaria"), and the account of years in primary school, Domnu Trandafir. They were followed in 1944 by Anii de ucenicie ("The Apprenticeship Years"), where Sadoveanu details some of his earliest experiences. Despite his temptation for destroying all raw personal notes, Sadoveanu wrote and kept a large number of diaries, which were never published in his lifetime.

=== Other early writings ===
Also during that time, he retold and prefaced the journeys of Thomas Witlam Atkinson, an English architect and stonemason who spent years in Tartary (a book he titled Cuibul invaziilor, "The Nest of Invasions"). This was evidence of his growing interest in exotic subjects, which he later adapted to a series of novels, where the setting is "Scythia", seen as an ancestral area of culture connecting Central Asia with the European region of Dacia (partly coinciding with present-day Romania). The home of mysterious Asiatic peoples, Sadoveanu's Scythia is notably the background to his novels Uvar and Nopțile de Sânziene. The former shows its eponymous character, a Yakut, exposed to the scrutiny of a Russian officer. In the latter, titled after the ancestral celebration of Sânziene during the month of June, shows a French intellectual meeting a nomadic tribe of Moldavian Rom people, who, the reader learns, are actually the descendants of Pechenegs. Călinescu notes that, in such writings, "the intrigue is a pretext", again serving to depict the vast wilderness confronted with the keen eye of foreign observers. He sees Nopțile de Sânziene as "the novel of millenarian immobility", and its theme as one of mythological proportions. The narrative pretexts, including the Sânziene celebration and the Rom people's social atavism, connect Nopțile... with another one of Sadoveanu's writings, 24 iunie ("June 24").

According to Tudor Vianu, the 1933 fantasy novel Creanga de aur ("The Golden Bow") takes partial inspiration from Byzantine literature, and is evidence of a form of Humanism found in Eastern philosophy. Marcel Cornis-Pope places it among Sadoveanu's "mythic-poetic narratives that explored the ontology and symbolics of history." The writer himself acknowledged that the esoteric nature of the book was inspired by his own affiliation to the Freemasonry, whose symbolism it partly reflected. Its protagonist, Kesarion Brebu, is included by Vianu among the images of sages and soothsayers in Mihail Sadoveanu's fiction, and, as "the last Deceneus", is a treasurer of ancient secret sciences mastered by the Dacians and the Ancient Egyptians. The novel is often interpreted as Sadoveanu's perspective on the Dacian contribution to Romanian culture.

Sadoveanu's series of minor novels and stories of the interwar years also comprises a set of usually urban-themed writings, which, Călinescu argues, resemble the works of Honoré de Balzac, but develop into "regressive" texts with "a lyrical intrigue". They include Duduia Margareta ("Miss Margareta"), where a conflict occurs between a young woman and her governess, and Locul unde nu s-a întâmplat nimic ("The Place Where Nothing Happened"), where, in what is a retake on his own Apa morților, Sadoveanu depicts the cultured but bored boyar Lai Cantacuzin and his growing affection for a modest young woman, Daria Mazu. In Cazul Eugeniței Costea ("The Case of Eugenița Costea"), a civil servant kills himself to avoid prosecution, and his end is replicated by that of his daughter, brought to despair by her stepfather's character and by her mother's irrational jealousy. Demonul tinereții ("The Demon of Youth"), believed by Călinescu to be "the most charming" in this series, has for its protagonist Natanail, a university dropout who has developed a morbid fear of women since losing the love of his life, and who lives in seclusion as a monk. In the rural-themed Paștele blajinilor ("Thomas Sunday") of 1935, a defeated brigand seeks a dignified end to his wasted life. Written in 1938, the short story Ochi de urs ("Bear's Eye") introduces its hero Culi Ursake, the toughened hunter, into a bizarre scenery that seems to mock a human's understanding.

During the period, Mihail Sadoveanu also wrote children's literature. His most significant pieces in this field are Dumbrava minunată ("The Enchanted Grove", 1926), Măria-sa Puiul Pădurii ("His Highness the Forest Boy", 1931), and a collection of stories adapted from Persian literature (Divanul persian, "The Persian Divan", 1940). Măria-sa Puiul Pădurii is itself an adaptation of the Geneviève de Brabant story, considered "somewhat highbrow" by George Călinescu, while the frame story Divanul persian consciously recalls the work of 19th century Wallachian writer Anton Pann. In 1909, Sadoveanu also published adapted version of two ancient writings: the Alexander Romance (as Alexandria) and Aesop's Fables (as Esopia). His 1921 book Cocostârcul albastru ("The Blue Crane") is a series of short stories with lyrical themes. Among his early writings are two biographical novels which retell historical events from the source, Viața lui Ștefan cel Mare ("The Life of Stephen the Great") and Lacrimile ieromonahului Veniamin ("The Tears of Veniamin the Hieromonk"), both of which, Călinescu objected, lacked in originality. The former, published in 1934, was more noted among critics, for both intimate tone and hagiographic character (recounting Stephen's life on the model of saints' biographies).

=== Socialist realism years ===
Despite the post-1944 change in approach, Sadoveanu's characteristic narrative style remained largely unmodified. In contrast, his choice of themes changed, a transition which reflected political imperatives. At the end of the process, literary historian Ana Selejan argues, Sadoveanu became the most influential prose author among Romanian Socialist realists, equaled only by the younger Petru Dumitriu. Historian Bogdan Ivașcu writes that Sadoveanu's affiliation with "proletarian culture" and "its masquerade", like that of Tudor Arghezi and George Călinescu, although it may have been intended to rally "prestige and depth" to Socialist realism, only succeeded in bring their late works to the level of "propaganda and agitation materials." In contrast to these retrospective assessments, communist literary critics and cultural promoters of the 1950s regularly described Sadoveanu as the model to follow, both before and after Georgy Malenkov's views on culture were adopted as the norm.

In his Lumina vine de la Răsărit, the writer built on the opposition between light and darkness, identifying the former with Soviet policies and the latter with capitalism. Sadoveanu thus spoke of "the dragon of my own doubts" being vanquished by "the Sun of the East". Historian Adrian Cioroianu notes that this literary antithesis came to be widely used by various Romanian authors who rallied with Stalinism during the late 1940s, citing among these Cezar Petrescu and the former avant-garde writer Sașa Pană. He also notes that such imagery, accompanied by portrayals of Soviet joy and abundance, replicated an ancient "structure of myth", adapting it to a new ideology on the basis of "what could be imagined, not of what could be believed." Ioan Stanomir writes that Sadoveanu and his fellow ARLUS members use a discourse recalling the theme of a religious conversion, analogous to that of Paul the Apostle (see Road to Damascus), and critic Cornel Ungureanu stresses that Sadoveanu's texts of the period frequently quote the Bible.

Following his return from the Soviet Union, Sadoveanu published travelogues and reportage piece, including the 1945 Moscova ("Moscow", co-authored with Traian Săvulescu and economist Mitiță Constantinescu) and the 1946 Caleidoscop ("Kaleidoscope"). In one of these accounts, he details his encounter with Lysenkoist agronomist Nikolay Tsistsin, and claims to have tasted bread made from a brand of wheat which yielded 4,000 kilograms of grain per hectare. In a later memoir, Sadoveanu depicted his existence and the destiny of his country as improved by the communist system, and gave accounts of his renewed journeys in the countryside, where he claimed to have witnessed a "spiritual splendor" supported by "the practice of the new times". He would follow up with hundreds of articles on various subjects, published by the communist press, including two 1953 pieces in which he lamented Stalin's death (one of them referred to the Soviet leader as "the great genius of progressive mankind").

Upon its publication, the political novel Mitrea Cocor, which depicts the hardships and eventual triumph of its eponymous peasant protagonist, was officially described as the first Socialist realist writing in local literature, and as a turning point in literary history. Often compared to Dan Deșliu's ideologized poem Lazăr de la Rusca, it is remembered as a controversial epic dictated by ideological requirements, and argued to have been written with assistance from several other authors. Seen by historiographer Lucian Boia as an "embarrassing literary fabrication", it was rated by literary critics Dan C. Mihăilescu and Luminița Marcu both as one of "the most harmful books in Romanian literature", and by historian Ioan Lăcustă as "a propaganda writing, a failure from a literary point of view". A praise of collectivization policies that some critics believe was a testimony that Sadoveanu was submitting himself and imposing his public to brainwashing, Mitrea Cocor was preceded by Păuna-Mică, a novel which also idealizes collective farming.

With his final published work, the 1951-1952 novel Nicoară Potcoavă, Sadoveanu retells the narrative of his Șoimii, modifying the plot and adding new characters. Noted among the latter is Olimbiada, a female soothsayer and healer through whose words Sadoveanu again dispenses his own perspective on human existence. The focus of the narrative is also changed: from the avenger of his brother's death in Șoimii, the pretender becomes a purveyor of folk identity, aiming to reestablish the Moldavia of Stephen the Great's times. Praised early on by Dumitriu, who believed it was proof of "artistic excellence", Nicoară Potcoavă is itself seen as a source for communist-inspired political messages. According to Cornel Ungureanu, this explains why it highlights the brotherhood between Cossacks and Moldavians, supposedly replicating the official view on Soviet-Romanian relations. Cornis-Pope, who considers the novel one of Sadoveanu's "mere variations" on old subjects, suggests that it transforms its protagonist "from medieval fighter into political philosopher who announces the rise of a 'new world'." Victor Frunză also notes that, although Sadoveanu returned to old subjects, he "no longer rises to the level he had reached before the war."

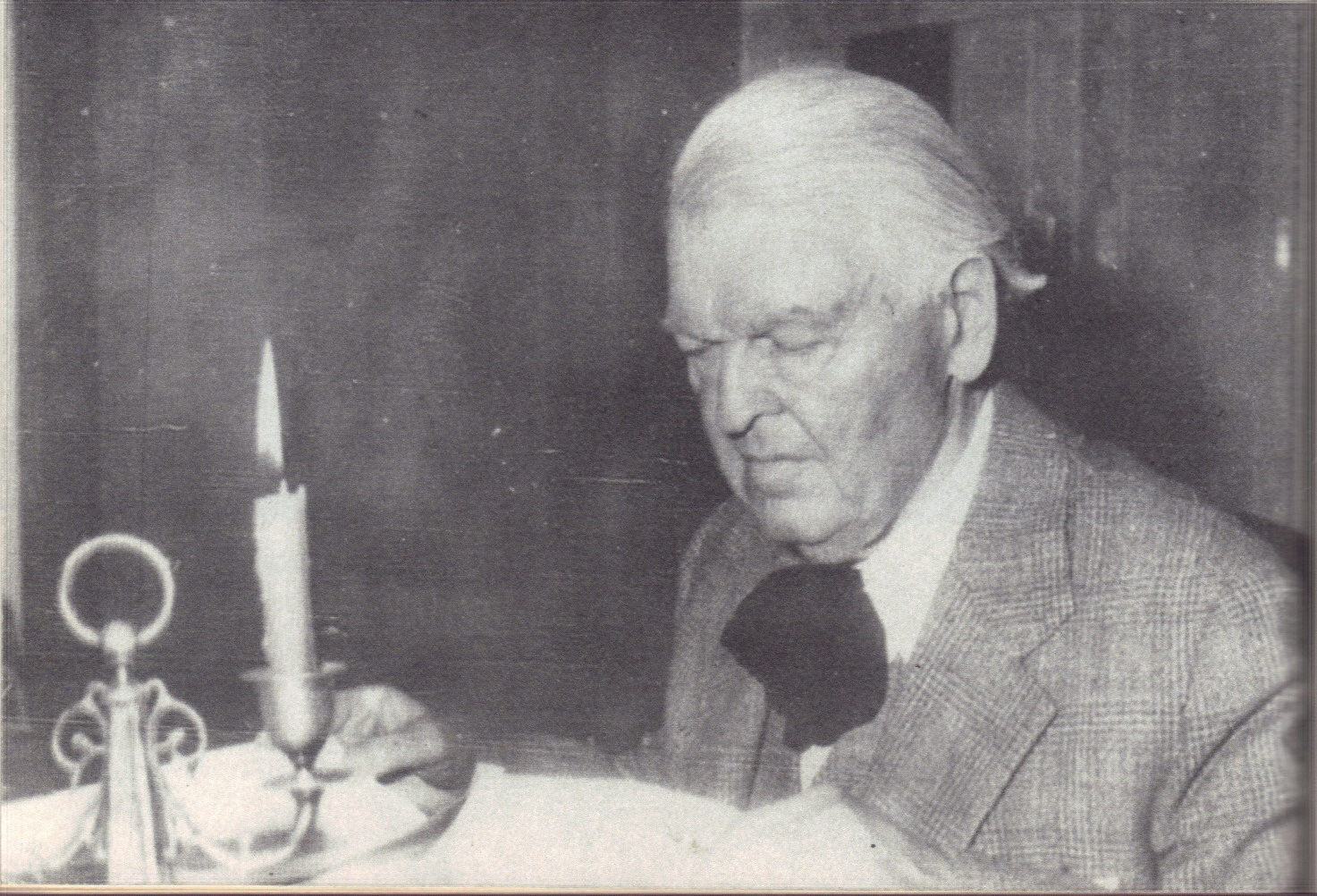
An elderly Sadoveanu sitting in front of his desk

The final part of Sadoveanu's creation also comprises a series of pieces where the narrative approach was, according to Crohmălniceanu, "corrected" to show his favorite recluse type won over by the new society. In essence, Ungureanu argues, the new style that of "reportage and plain information, adapted to orders coming from above". Such works include the 1951 Nada Florilor ("The Flowers' Lure") and Clonț-de-fier ("Iron Bucktooth"), alongside an unfinished piece, Cântecul mioarei ("Song of the Ewe"). In Nada..., the peasant boy Culai follows his hero, tinsmith Alecuțu, into factory life. Clonț-de-fier, an ideologized retake on Demonul tinereții, is about a monk returning from seclusion into the world of workers, where the landscape is reshaped by large-scale construction works. According to Ungureanu, it also shows Sadoveanu's universe stripped of "all its deep meanings." While their author came to personify the new cultural guidelines, Sadoveanu's previous books, from Frații Jderi to Baltagul, were subject to communist censorship. Various statements contradicting the ideological guidelines were cut out of new editions: the books in general could no longer include mentions of Bessarabia (a region first incorporated into the Soviet Union by a 1940 occupation) or Romanian Orthodox beliefs. In one such instance, censors of Baltagul removed a character's claim that "the Russian" was by nature "the drunkest of them all, [...] a worthy beggar and singer at the fairs."

== Politics ==
=== Nationalism and Humanism ===
Sadoveanu's engagement in politics was marked by abrupt changes in convictions, seeing him move from right- to left-wing stances several times in his life. In close connection with his traditionalist views on literature, but in contrast to his career under a Conservative Party and National Liberal cabinets, Sadoveanu initially rallied with nationalist groups of various hues, associating with both Nicolae Iorga and, in 1906, with the left-wing Poporanists at Viața Românească. An early cause of his was his attempt to reconcile Iorga with the Poporanists, but his efforts were largely fruitless. In the 1910s, the anti-Iorga traditionalist Ilarie Chendi recognized in Sadoveanu one of the Poporanists who promoted "the spiritual healing of our people through culture."

Around that time, he formulated a ruralist and nationalist perspective on life, rejecting what he deemed "the hybrid urban world" for "the world of our national realities". In Călinescu's analysis, this signifies that, like his predecessor, the conservative Eminescu, Sadoveanu believed the cities were victims of the "superimposed category" of foreigners, in particular those administering leasehold estates. Following the 1907 Peasants' Revolt, Sadoveanu sent a report to his Minister of Education Spiru Haret, informing him on the state of rural education, and, beyond this, of the problems faced by villagers in Moldavia. It read: "The leaseholders and landowners, no matter what their nationality, make a mockery of the Romanians' labors. Every surtucar [that is, urbanized character] in the village, mayors, notaries, paper-pushers, shamelessly [and] mercilessly milk this milk cow. They are joined by the priest—who [...] is in disagreement with the teacher." With Neamul Șoimăreștilor, the burdens of feudal society and mercantilism, most of all the restriction of economic rights, were becoming a background theme in his fiction, which later depicted Stephen the Great as the original champion of social justice (Frații Jderi). During most of his World War I activity, Sadoveanu also followed the Poporanists' Russophobia and dislike of the Entente side, describing the Russian Empire's national policies in Bessarabia as far more barbaric than Austria-Hungary's rule over Transylvania. In 1916, he abruptly switched to the Entente camp: his enthusiasm as propaganda officer was touched by controversy once Romania experienced massive defeats; Sadoveanu himself abandoned the Entente cause by 1918, when he was decommissioned, and resumed his flirtation with Constantin Stere's Germanophile lobby.

Călinescu sees Sadoveanu, alongside Stere, as one of Viața Românească's chief ideologues, noting that he was nonetheless "rendered notorious by his inconsistency and opportunism." He writes that Sadoveanu and Stere both showed a resentment for ethnic minorities, particularly members of the Jewish community, whom they saw as agents of exploitation, but that, as Humanists, they had a form of "humane sympathy" for Jews and foreigners taken individually. The Poporanist aspect of Sadoveanu's literature was also highlighted by Garabet Ibrăileanu in the late 1920s, when he referred to his contributions as evidence that Romanian culture was successfully returning to its specific originality. In essence, Crohmălniceanu writes, Sadoveanu was tied to Viața Românească by his advocacy of national specificity, his preference for the large-scale narrative, and his vision of pristine, "natural", human beings.

According to Z. Ornea, Sadoveanu's affiliation to the Freemasonry shaped not only his political "demophilia", but also his "Weltanschauung, and, through a reflex, his [literary] work." By consequence, Ornea argues, Sadoveanu became a supporter of democracy, a stance which led him into open conflict with extreme nationalists. Alongside its Humanism, Sadoveanu's nationalism was noted for being secular, and thus in contrast with the Romanian Orthodox imagery favored by nationalists on the far right. Sadoveanu rejected the notion that ancestral Romanians were religious individuals, stating that their belief was in fact "limited to rituals and customs." He was also a vocal supporter of international cooperation, particularly among countries in Eastern and Central Europe. Writing for the magazine Familia in 1935, 17 years after Transylvania's union with Romania and 15 years after the Treaty of Trianon, Sadoveanu joined the Hungarian author Gyula Illyés in pleading for good relations between the two neighbors. As noted by Crohmălniceanu, although Sadoveanu's interwar novels may depict both clashes between polities and benign misunderstandings, they ultimately discourage ethnic stereotypes, suggesting that "the gifts and qualities of various kinships" are mutually compatible. According to Marcel Cornis-Pope, this cooperative vision is the background theme to Divanul persian, a book "demonstrating the value of intercultural dialogue at a time of sharp political polarization." The same text was described by Vianu as evidence of Sadoveanu's "understanding, gentleness and tolerance".

In 1926, the year of his entry into Alexandru Averescu's People's Party, Sadoveanu motivated his choice in a letter to Octavian Goga, indicating his belief that the intelligentsia needed to partake in politics: "It would seem that what is foremost needed is the contribution of intellectuals, in an epoch when the overall intellectual level is decreasing." His sincerity was doubted by his contemporaries: both his friend Gheorghe Jurgea-Negrilești and the communist Petre Pandrea recount how, in 1926–1927, Sadoveanu and Păstorel Teodoreanu requested public funds from Interior Minister Goga, with Sadoveanu motivating that he wanted to set up a cultural magazine and later spending the money on his personal wardrobe. In contrast, Adrian Cioroianu notes that the People's Party episode, and especially the "mutual wariness" between Sadoveanu and the National Liberals, underlined the writer's sympathy for the "intellectual Left". Himself a Marxist, Ovid Crohmălniceanu suggested that, as early as the 1930s, Sadoveanu's attitudes were rather similar to the official line of communist groups.

=== Opposition to fascism and support for King Carol ===
During the 1930s, following his stint as head of Adevărul, a leftist newspaper owned by Jewish entrepreneurs, Sadoveanu was targeted by right-wing voices, who claimed that he had chosen to abandon his nationalist credentials. Thus, Sadoveanu became the target of a press campaign in the antisemitic and fascist press, and in particular in Nichifor Crainic's Sfarmă-Piatră and the journals connected with the Iron Guard. The former publication deplored his supposed "betrayal" of the nationalist cause. In it, Ovidiu Papadima portrayed Sadoveanu as the victim of Jewish manipulation, and equated his affiliation to the Freemasonry with devil worship, and mocked his obesity, while Crainic himself compared the writer to his own character, the treacherous Ieremia Golia. Porunca Vremii often referred to him as Jidoveanu (from jidov, a dismissive term for "Jew"), depicted him as an agent of "Judaeo-communism" motivated by "perversity", and called on the public to harass the writer and beat him with stones. It also protested when the public authorities in Fălticeni refused to withdraw Sadoveanu the title of honorary citizen, and again when the University of Iași made him a doctor honoris causa, and, through the voice of novelist N. Crevedia, even suggested that the writer should use his hunting rifle to commit suicide. In 1937, Porunca Vremii congratulated ultra-nationalists who had organized public burnings of Sadoveanu's works in Southern Dobruja and in Hunedoara, as well as non-identified people who sent the writer packages containing shredded copies of his own volumes. In April 1937, the anti-Sadoveanu campaign was met with the indignation of various public figures, who issued an "Appeal of the Intellectuals", signed by Liviu Rebreanu, Eugen Lovinescu, Petru Groza, Victor Eftimiu, George Topîrceanu, Zaharia Stancu, Demostene Botez, Alexandru Al. Philippide, Constantin Balmuș and others. Denouncing the campaign as a "moral assassination", it referred to Sadoveanu as the author of "the most Romanian [works] in our literature." Sadoveanu himself defended his fellow writer Tudor Arghezi, who stood accused by the far right press of having written "pornography".

Reviewing the consequences of these scandals, Ovid Crohmălniceanu suggests that all of what Mihail Sadoveanu wrote from 1938 to 1943 is in some way connected to the cause of anti-fascism. According to Cornis-Pope, Sadoveanu's dislike for the far right can be discovered in Creanga de aur, which doubles as "a political parable opposing an archaic peasant civilization to the growing threat of fascism." However, George Călinescu claims, the writer himself had not actually revised his nationalist outlook, that he continued to believe that minorities and foreigners were a risky presence in Greater Romania, and that his Humanism was "a light tincture". In one of his columns, Sadoveanu replied to those organizing the acts of vandalism, indicating that, had they actually read the novels they were destroying, they would have found "a burning faith in this nation, for so long mistreated by cunning men". Elsewhere, stating that he was not going to take his detractors into consideration, Sadoveanu defined himself as an adversary of both Nazi Germany and any form of advocacy for a "National-Socialist regime in our country".

Sadoveanu's subsequent endorsement of authoritarian King Carol II and his corporatist force, the National Renaissance Front, saw his participation in the monarch's personality cult. In 1940, he offered controversial praise to the ruler through the official journal, Revista Fundațiilor Regale, which caused Carol's political adversary, psychologist Nicolae Mărgineanu, to deem Sadoveanu and his fellow contributors "scoundrels". His renewed mandate in the Senate was a favor from Carol, also granted to George Enescu, philosopher Lucian Blaga, scientists Emil Racoviță and Iuliu Hațieganu, and several other public figures. During the Ion Antonescu dictatorship, Sadoveanu kept a low profile and was apolitical. However, Cioroianu writes, he supported the invasion of the Soviet Union and Romania's cooperation with the Axis powers on the Eastern Front, seeing in this a chance to recover Bessarabia and the northern part of Bukovina (lost to the 1940 Soviet occupation). In spring 1944, months before the King Michael Coup toppled the regime, he was approached by the clandestine Romanian Communist Party and its sympathizers in academia to sign an open letter condemning Romania's alliance to Nazi Germany. According to the communist activist Belu Zilber, who took part in this action, Sadoveanu, like his fellow intellectuals Dimitrie Gusti, Simion Stoilow and Horia Hulubei, refused to sign the document. Also according to Zilber, Sadoveanu motivated his refusal by stating that the letter needed to be addressed not to Antonescu, but to King Michael I. However, and aside from its main topic, Păuna-Mică was noted as one of the few prose works of the 1940s to mention the wartime deportation of Romanian Jews by Antonescu's regime; Caleidoscop also speaks about the 1941 Iași pogrom as "our shame", and commends those who opposed it.

=== Partnership with the communists ===
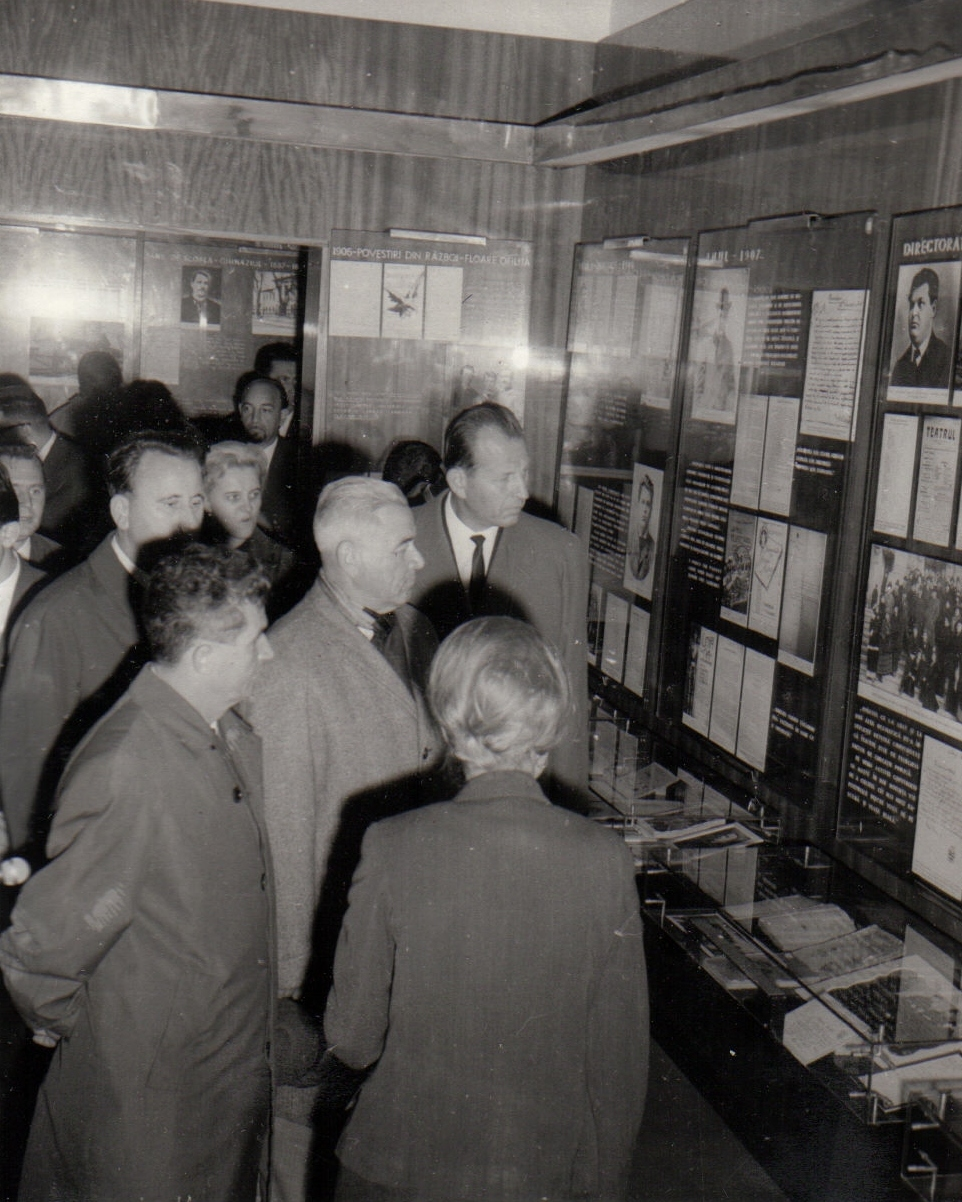
Communist Romania's leader Nicolae Ceaușescu (front row, left) visiting Sadoveanu's memorial house at Voividenia (1966)

Following his Lumina vine de la Răsărit lecture, Sadoveanu became noted for his positive portrayals of communization and collectivization. In particular, Sadoveanu offered praise to one of the major pillars of Stalinism, the 1936 Soviet Constitution. In 1945, claiming to have been "flashed upon" by "Stalin's argumentation", he urged the public to read the document for its "sincerity"; elsewhere, he equated reading the constitution with "a mystical revelation". Adrian Cioroianu describes this as "an office assignment" from the ARLUS, at a time when the group was circulating free translated copies of the Soviet constitution. The enthusiasm of his writings also manifested itself in his public behavior: according to his ARLUS colleague Iorgu Iordan, Sadoveanu was emotional during the 1945 Soviet trip, shedding tears of joy upon visiting a day care center in the countryside. Running in the 1946 election, Sadoveanu blamed the old political class in general for the problems faced by Romanian peasants, including the major drought of that year. By then, his political partners were making use of his literary fame, and his electoral pamphlet read: "There is no doubt that the thousands of people who have read his works will rush out on [election day] to vote for him." After 1948, when the Romanian communist regime was installed, Sadoveanu directed his praise toward the new authorities. In 1952, as Romania adopted its second republican constitution and the authorities intensified repression against anti-communists, Sadoveanu made some of his most controversial statements. Declaring the defunct kingdom to have been a "long interval of organized injustice and crooked development in all areas", he presented the new order as an era of social justice, human dignity, available culture and universal public education.

Criticism of Sadoveanu's moral choices also focuses on the fact that, while he led a luxurious existence, many of his generation colleagues and fellow intellectuals were being persecuted or jailed in notoriously harsh circumstances. Having tolerated the purge within the Romanian Academy, Cioroianu notes, Sadoveanu accepted being colleagues with newly promoted "secondary characters [...] whom the new regime needed", such as poet Dumitru Theodor Neculuță and historian Mihail Roller. In his official capacity, Sadoveanu even signed several death sentences declared by communist tribunals, and, in the wake of the Tămădău Affair of summer 1947, presided over the Chamber sessions which outlawed the opposition National Peasants' Party: according to researcher Victor Frunză, he was a willing participant in this, having been upset by the exposure of his personal wealth in the National Peasantist press. Later, Sadoveanu made a reference to his former colleague, the National Peasantist activist Ion Mihalache, arguing that his old Agrarianist approach to politics had made him a "ridiculous character". Ioan Stanomir describes this fragment as one of "intellectual abjection", indicating that Mihalache, already a political prisoner of the regime, was to die in captivity. However, as leader of the Romanian Writers' Union, the aging writer is credited by some with having protected poet Nicolae Labiș, a disillusioned communist who had been excluded from the Union of Worker Youth in spring 1954, and whose work Sadoveanu treasured. He is also reported to have helped George Călinescu publish the novel Scrinul negru, mediating between him and communist leader Gheorghe Gheorghiu-Dej.

Mihail Sadoveanu provided a definition of his own political transition in conversation with fellow writer Ion Biberi (1946). At the time, he claimed: "I have never engaged in politics, in the sense that one assigns to this word." He elaborated: "I am a left-wing person, following the line of a Poporanist zeal in the spirit of Viața Românească, but one adapted to the new circumstances." Cioroianu sees in such statements evidence that, trying to discard his past, Sadoveanu was including himself among the socialist intellectuals "willing to let themselves be won over by the indescribable charm and the full swing of the communist utopia", but that he may in reality have been "motivated by fear". Paraphrasing communist vocabulary, Stanomir describes the writer as one of the "bourgeois" personalities who became "fellow travelers" of the communists, and argues that Sadoveanu's claim to have always leaned towards a "people's democracy" inaugurated "a pattern of chameleonism". In the view of historian Vladimir Tismăneanu, Sadoveanu, like Parhon, George Călinescu, Traian Săvulescu and others, was one of the "non-communist intellectuals" attracted into cooperation with the Romanian Communist Party and the communist regime (Tismăneanu also argues that these figures' good relationship with Gheorghiu-Dej was a factor in the process, as was Gheorghiu-Dej's ability to make himself look "harmless"). Others have submitted that Sadoveanu's faction in the Freemasonry, which included far left advocates Mihai Ralea and Alexandru Claudian, and officially supported evolutionary socialism, was a natural partner of the communists, to the point of sanctioning its own state-organized suppression.

According to Adrian Cioroianu, Sadoveanu was not necessarily an "apostle of communization", and his role in the process is subject to much debate. Describing the writer's "conversion to philosovietism" as "purely contextual", Cioroianu also points out that the very notion of "light arising in the East" is read by some as Sadoveanu's encoded message to other Freemasons, warning them of a Soviet threat to the organization. The historian notes that, for all their possible lack in sincerity, Sadoveanu's statements provided a template for other intellectuals to follow—this, he argues, was the case of Cezar Petrescu. Other statements made by Sadoveanu also displayed a possibly studied ambiguity, as is the case with a 1952 lecture he gave in front of young writers attending the Party-controlled School of Literature, where he implicitly denied that one could be created a writer unless by "God or Mother Nature".

== Legacy ==
=== Influence ===
Sadoveanu's prose, in particular his treatment of natural settings, was a direct influence in the works of writers such as Dimitrie D. Pătrășcanu, Nicolae N. Beldiceanu, Jean Bart, and Al. Lascarov-Moldovanu; his storytelling techniques were also sometimes borrowed by comedic novelist Damian Stănoiu, and, in later years, by historical novelist Dumitru Vacariu. According to Călinescu, Sadoveanu's early hunting stories published by Viața Românească, together with those of Junimist Nicolae Gane, helped establish the genre within the framework of Romanian literature, and paved the way for its predilect use in the works of Ioan Alexandru Brătescu-Voinești. Călinescu also notes that Scrisorile unui răzeș ("Letters of a Peasant"), an early work by novelist Cezar Petrescu, are deeply marked by Sadoveanu's influence, and that the same writer's use of the Moldavian dialect is a "pastiche" from Sadoveanu. Ion Vinea too, while expressing admiration for Sadoveanu, defined all his disciples and imitators as "mushroom-writers from Sadoveanu's woods" and "butlers who steal [their lord's lingerie] in order to wear his blazon". The issue was much later discussed by writer-critic Ioan Holban, who likewise described most historical novelists inspired by Sadoveanu as "insignificant" to Romanian letters.

Under the early stages of the communist regime, before the rise of Nicolae Ceaușescu engendered a series of rehabilitations and accommodated nationalism, the Romanian curriculum was dependent on ideological guidelines. At the time, Sadoveanu was one of the writers from the interwar whose work was still made available to Romanian schoolchildren. In the 1953 Romanian language and literature manual, he represented his generation alongside the communist authors Alexandru Toma and Alexandru Sahia, and was introduced mainly through his Mitrea Cocor. At the time, studies of his work were published by prominent communist critics, among them Ovid Crohmălniceanu, Paul Georgescu, Traian Șelmaru, Mihai Novicov, Eugen Campus and Dumitru Isac, while a 1953 reissue of Baltagul was published in 30,000 copies (a number rarely met by the Romanian publishing industry in that context). In later years, Profira Sadoveanu became a noted promoter of her father's literature and public image, publishing children's versions of his biography, notably featuring illustrations by Mac Constantinescu (1955 edition).

Although Sadoveanu continued to be hailed as a major writer during the Ceaușescu years, and the seventy years of his debut were marked with state ceremony, the reaction against Soviet influence affected presentations of his work: his official bibliography no longer included any mention of Păuna-Mică. Among the memoirs dealing with Sadoveanu's late years were those of Alexandru Rosetti, published in 1977. The official revival of nationalist discourse in the 1960s allowed controversial critic Edgar Papu to formulate his version of Protochronism, which postulated that phenomenons within Romanian culture preceded developments in world culture. In this context, Papu spoke of Sadoveanu as "one of the great precursory voices", comparing him to Rabindranath Tagore. After the 1989 Revolution toppled communism, Sadoveanu remained an influence on some young authors, who recovered the themes of his work in a Postmodern or parodic manner. Among them is Dan Lungu, who, according to critic Andrei Terian, alluded to the Hanu Ancuței frame story when constructing his 2004 novel Paradisul găinilor. In 2001, a poll carried among literati by Observator Cultural magazine listed six of his works as some of the best 150 Romanian novels.

Mihail Sadoveanu's various works were widely circulated abroad. This phenomenon began as early as 1905, when German-language translations were first published, and continued during the 1930s, when Venea o moară pe Siret... was translated very soon after its original Romanian edition. In 1931, female author and feminist militant Sarina Cassvan included French-language versions of his texts into an anthology designed to promote modern Romanian culture internationally. Also then, some of Sadoveanu's texts were rendered in Chinese by Lu Xun.

Tudor Vianu attributes the warm international reception Sadoveanu generally received to his abilities in rendering the Romanians' "own way of sensing and seeing nature and humanity", while literary historian Adrian Marino points out that, Sadoveanu and Liviu Rebreanu were exceptional in their generation for taking an active interest in how their texts were translated, edited and published abroad.

Later, publicizing Sadoveanu's work to Eastern Bloc and world audiences became a priority for the communist regime. Thus, Mitrea Cocor was, together with similar works by Zaharia Stancu and Eusebiu Camilar, among the first wave of Romanian books to have been translated into Czech and published in Communist Czechoslovakia. Alongside similar works by Petru Dumitriu, Mitrea Cocor was also among the few English-language editions sanctioned by the Romanian regime, being translated and published, with a preface by Jack Lindsay, in 1953. Nine years later, the collected short stories were a tool for cultural exchange between Romania and the United States. Sadoveanu's good standing in the Soviet Union after World War II also made him one of the few Romanian writers whose works were still being published in the Moldavian SSR (which, as part of Bessarabia, had previously been a region of Greater Romania).

Sadoveanu's diaries and notes were collected and edited during the early 2000s, being published in 2006 by Editura Junimea and the MLR. The main coordinators of this project were literary historian Constantin Ciopraga and Constantin Mitru, who was Sadoveanu's brother-in-law and personal secretary. The popularity of his writings remained high into the early 21st century: in 2004, when the country marked a hundred years since Sadoveanu's debut, Șoimii was published in its 15th edition. According to Simuț, the occasion itself was nevertheless marked with "the impression of general indifference", making Sadoveanu seem "a submerged continent, remembered by us only with piousness and confusion".

=== Tributes ===
Sadoveanu is an occasional presence in the literary works of his fellow generation members. His Țara de dincolo de negură was partly written as a tribute to George Topîrceanu's piece of the same name, with both authors sketching an affectionate portrait of one another. Topîrceanu also parodied his friend's style in a five-paragraph sketch, part of a series of such fragments, recorded their encounters in various other autobiographical writings, and dedicated him the first version of his poem Balada popii din Rudeni ("Ballad of the Priest from Rudeni"). Under the name Nicolae Pădureanu, Sadoveanu is a character in the novel and disguised autobiography În preajma revoluției ("On the Eve of the Revolution"), authored by his colleague Constantin Stere. Sadoveanu is honored in two writings by Nicolae Labiș, collectively titled Sadoveniene ("Sadovenians"). The first, titled Mihail Sadoveanu, is a prose poem which alludes to Sadoveanu's prose, and the other, a free verse piece, is titled Cozma Răcoare.

In his scientific study of Sadoveanu's work, Eugen Lovinescu himself turns to pure literature, portraying Sadoveanu as a child blessed by the Moirai or ursitoare with ironic gifts, such as an obstinacy for nature writing in the absence of actual observation ("You shall write; you shall write and could never stop yourself writing [...]. The readers will grow tired, but you will remain tireless; you shall not known rest, just as you shall not know nature [...]"). George Călinescu was one to object to this portrayal, noting that it was merely a "literary device which hardly covers the emptiness of [Lovinescu's] idea." Also during the interwar, philosopher Mihai Ralea made Mihail Sadoveanu the subject of a sociological study investigating his literary contributions in the context of social evolutions.

A portrait of Sadoveanu was drawn by graphic artist Ary Murnu, within a larger work which depicts the Kübler Coffeehouse society. Sadoveanu was also the subject of a 1929 painting by Ștefan Dumitrescu, part of a series on Viața Românească figures. In its original edition, Mitrea Cocor was supposed to feature a series of drawings made by Corneliu Baba, one of the best-known Romanian visual artists for his generation. Baba, who had been officially criticized for "formalism", was pressured by the authorities into accepting the commission or risk a precarious existence. The result of his work was rejected with a similar label, and the sketches were for long not made available to the public. Baba also painted Sadoveanu's portrait, which, in 1958, art critic Krikor Zambaccian as "the synthesis of Baba's art", depicting "a man of letters aware of his mission [and] the leading presence of an active consciousness". Constantin Mitru inherited the painting and passed it on to the Museum of Romanian Literature (MLR). A marble bust of Sadoveanu, the work of Ion Irimescu, was set up in Fălticeni in 1977. In Bucharest, a memorial plaque was placed on Pitar Moș Street, on a house where he lived for a period. During the 1990s, another bust of Sadoveanu, the work of several sculptors, was unveiled in Chișinău, Republic of Moldova (the former Moldavian SSR), part of the Aleea Clasicilor sculptural ensemble.

Sadoveanu's writings also made an impact on film culture, and in particular on Romanian cinema of the communist period. However, the first film based on his works was a German production of 1929: based on Venea o moară... and titled Sturmflut der Liebe ("Storm Tide of Love"), it notably starred Marcella Albani, Alexandru Giugaru and Ion Brezeanu. The series of Romanian-made films began with the 1952 Mitrea Cocor, co-directed by Marietta Sadova (who also starred in the film) and Victor Iliu. The film itself was closely supervised for conformity with ideological guidelines, and had to be partly redone because its original version did not meet them. Mircea Drăgan directed a 1965 version of Neamul Șoimăreștilor (with a screenplay co-written by Constantin Mitru) and a 1973 adaptation of Frații Jderi (with contributions by Mitru and by Profira Sadoveanu). In 1969, Romanian studios produced a film version of Baltagul, directed by Mircea Mureșan and with Sidonia Manolache as Vitoria Lipan. Ten years later, Constantin Vaeni released Vacanță tragică ("Tragic Holiday"), based on Nada Florilor, followed by a 1980 adaptation of Dumbrava minunată and Stere Gulea's 1983 Ochi de urs (tr. "The Bear Eye's Curse"). In 1989, just before the Romanian Revolution, Dan Pița produced his film The Last Ball in November, based on Locul unde nu s-a întâmplat nimic.

During the early decades of communist rule, Sadoveanu, Alexandru Toma and later Tudor Arghezi were often paid homage with state celebrations, likened by literary critic Florin Mihăilescu to the personality cult reserved for Stalin and Gheorghe Gheorghiu-Dej. For a while after the writer's death, the Writers' Union club, commonly known as "The Writers' House", bore Sadoveanu's name. Casa cu turn in Iași, which Sadoveanu had donated to the state in 1950, went through a period of neglect and was finally set up as a museum in 1980. Similar sites were set up in his Fălticeni house, and in his final residence at Voividenia, while the Bradu-Strâmb chalet was controversially granted to the Securitate, and later to the Romanian Police. Each year, Iași commemorates the writer through a cultural festival known as the "Mihail Sadoveanu Days". In 2004, the 100th anniversary of his debut was marked by a series of exhibits and symposiums, organized by the MLR. Similar events are regularly held in various cities, and include the "In Sadoveanu's Footsteps" colloquy of writers, held during March 2006 in the city of Piatra Neamț. Since 2003, in tribute to Sadoveanu's love for the game, an annual chess tournament is held in Iași. The Sadoveanu High School and a bookstore in Bucharest are named after him, and streets named after him exist in, among other places, Iași, Fălticeni, Timișoara, Oradea, Brașov, Galați, Suceava, Călărași, Târgu Jiu, Miercurea Ciuc, Petroșani, and Mangalia. Pașcani hosts a cultural center, a high school and a library named after him. Sadoveanu's memory is also regularly honored in the Republic of Moldova, where, in 2005, the 125th anniversary of his birth was celebrated in an official context. A street in Chișinău and a high school in the town of Cupcini are also named after him.

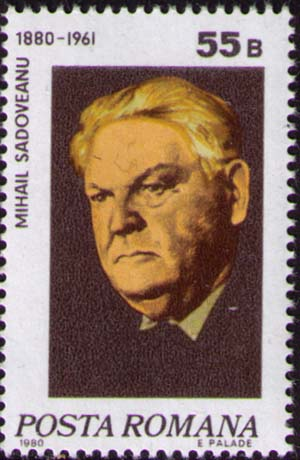
Romanian stamp commemorating Sadoveanu (1980)

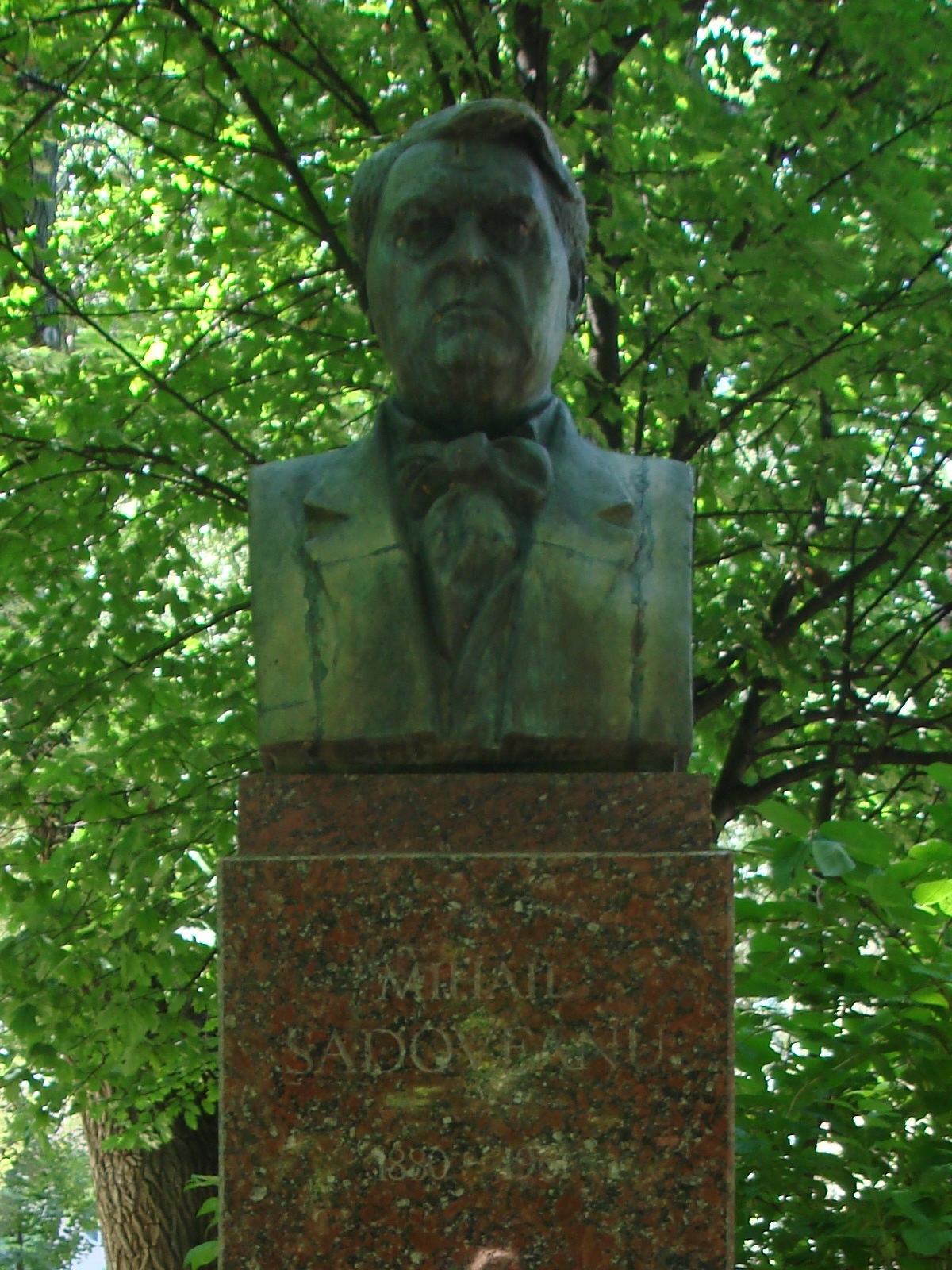
Sadoveanu's bust on Aleea Clasicilor, Chișinău, Moldova

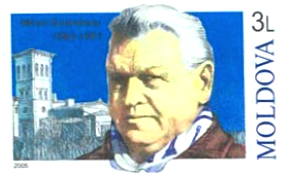
Sadoveanu's portrait on a Moldovan postal stationery item

== Selected works ==
=== Fiction ===
- 1902 - Frații Potcoavă
- 1904 - Șoimii
- 1905 - Floare ofilită
- 1906 - Însemnările lui Neculai Manea
- 1907 - La noi, la Viișoara
- 1907 - Vremuri de bejenie
- 1908 - Balta liniștii
- 1908 - Haia Sanis
- 1911 - Apa morților
- 1915 - Neamul Șoimăreștilor
- 1925 - Venea o moară pe Siret...
- 1928 - Hanu Ancuței
- 1929 - Zodia Cancerului
- 1930 - Baltagul
- 1932 - Nunta Domniței Ruxandra
- 1932 - Uvar
- 1933 - Creanga de aur
- 1934 - Nopțile de Sânziene
- 1935-1942 - Frații Jderi
- 1949 - Mitrea Cocor
- 1951-1952 - Nicoară Potcoavă

=== Non-fiction ===
- 1907 - Domnu Trandafir
- 1908 - Oameni și locuri
- 1914 - Priveliști dobrogene
- 1916 - 44 de zile în Bulgaria
- 1921 - Drumuri basarabene
- 1926 - Țara de dincolo de negură
- 1928 - Împărăția apelor
- 1928 - Olanda
- 1936 - Însemnări ieșene
- 1937 - Istorisiri de vânătoare
- 1944 - Anii de ucenicie

== Notes ==
Political offices
Preceded by Traian Bratu	President of the Senate of Romania; 1931–1932	Succeeded by Neculai Costăchescu
Preceded by Alexandru Vaida-Voevod	President of the Chamber of Deputies of Romania; 1946–1948	Succeeded by Gheorghe Apostol as President of the Great National Assembly
