= Cornel Rusu =

Romanian water polo player

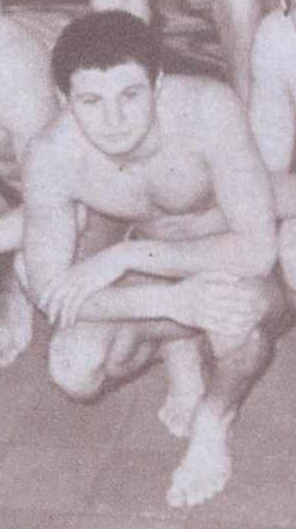
- Cornel Rusu 1965

Personal information
- Nationality: Romanian
- Born: 10 September 1944 (age 80); Craiova, Romania

Sport
- Sport: Water polo

Cornel Rusu (born 10 September 1944) is a Romanian water polo player. He competed at the 1972 Summer Olympics and the 1976 Summer Olympics.
