= Corbu =

Corbu may refer to:

- Corbu, Dondușeni, a commune in Dondușeni district, Moldova

== Populated places in Romania ==
- Corbu, Constanța, a commune in Constanța County
- Corbu, Harghita, a commune in Harghita County
- Corbu, Olt, a commune in Olt County
- Corbu, a village in Cătina Commune, Buzău County
- Corbu, a village in Glodeanu-Siliștea Commune, Buzău County
- Corbu, a village in Teslui Commune, Olt County
- Corbu, a village in Lipovăț Commune, Vaslui County
- Corbu, a district in Brezoi Town, Vâlcea County
- Corbu Nou and Corbu Vechi, villages in Măxineni Commune, Brăila County

== Rivers in Romania ==
- Corbu (Bistricioara), a tributary of the Bistricioara (Siret basin) in Harghita County
- Corbu, a tributary of the Boia Mică in Vâlcea County
- Corbu, a tributary of the Crevedia in Hunedoara County
- Corbu, a tributary of the Sebeș in Brașov County

== Surname ==
- Carol Corbu
- Haralambie Corbu
- Laurențiu Corbu
- Liliana Corbu
- Marius Corbu

== See also ==
- Ciorba
- Corb (disambiguation)
- Corban (disambiguation)
- Corbești (disambiguation)
- Corbeni (disambiguation)
- Corbi, name of two villages in Romania
- Corbeanca, name of two villages in Romania
