= Neamț =

Neamț may refer to the following places in Romania:

- Neamț County, an administrative division
- Neamț Citadel, a fortress near Târgu Neamț, Neamț County
- Piatra Neamț, the capital city of Neamț County
- Târgu Neamț, a town in Neamț County
- Neamț Monastery, a monastery near Târgu Neamț
- Neamț (Moldova), also Ozana, a tributary of the Moldova in Neamț County
- Neamț, a tributary of the Mraconia in Mehedinți County
- Neamțu, a tributary of the Nemțișor in Neamț County

== See also ==
- Németh
