= Corba =

Corba may refer to:

- CORBA
- Corba of Thorigne
- Spelling of "Čorba" (Chorba, a type of soup) without diacritics
- Bora Čorba, Serbian rock musician and singer-songwriter

== See also ==
- Corb (disambiguation)
- Ciorbă (surname)
- Corbu (disambiguation)
