= Rezu Mare =

- Location within Romania

Location
- Country: Romania
- Counties: Harghita

Physical characteristics
- Source: Giurgeu Mountains
- Mouth: Putna
  - location: near Tulgheș
  - coordinates: 46.9360°N 25.7499°E
- Length: 16 km (9.9 mi)
- Basin size: 47 km^{2} (18 sq mi)

Basin features
- Progression: Putna→ Bistricioara→ Bistrița→ Siret→ Danube→ Black Sea
- Tributaries
  - left: Pârâul Vacii, Roșu Mare, Pârâul lui Grigore, Beneș, Jang

The Rezu Mare is a left tributary of the river Putna in Romania. It flows into the Putna near Tulgheș. Its length is 16 km (9.9 mi) and its basin size is 47 km^{2} (18 sq mi).
