= Drahura =

Drahura Cacova
- Location within Romania

Location
- Country: Romania
- Counties: Neamț County
- Villages: Vânători-Neamț

Physical characteristics
- Mouth: Neamț
  - location: Târgu Neamț
  - coordinates: 47°12′38″N 26°19′56″E
  - elevation: 381 m (1,250 ft)
- Length: 8 km (5.0 mi)
- Basin size: 12 km^{2} (4.6 sq mi)

Basin features
- Progression: Neamț→ Moldova→ Siret→ Danube→ Black Sea
- Tributaries
  - left: Pârâul Butucilor
  - right: Căldarea, Drehuța
- River code: XII.1.40.41.6

The Drahura (also known as Cacova) is a right tributary of the river Neamț in Romania. It flows into the Neamț in the town of Târgu Neamț. The river has a length of 8 km (5.0 mi) and a basin size of 12 km^{2} (4.6 sq mi).

== Maps ==
- Harta turistică, Parcul Vânători-Neamț
