= Tulgheș =

Tulgheș Gyergyótölgyes
- Commune
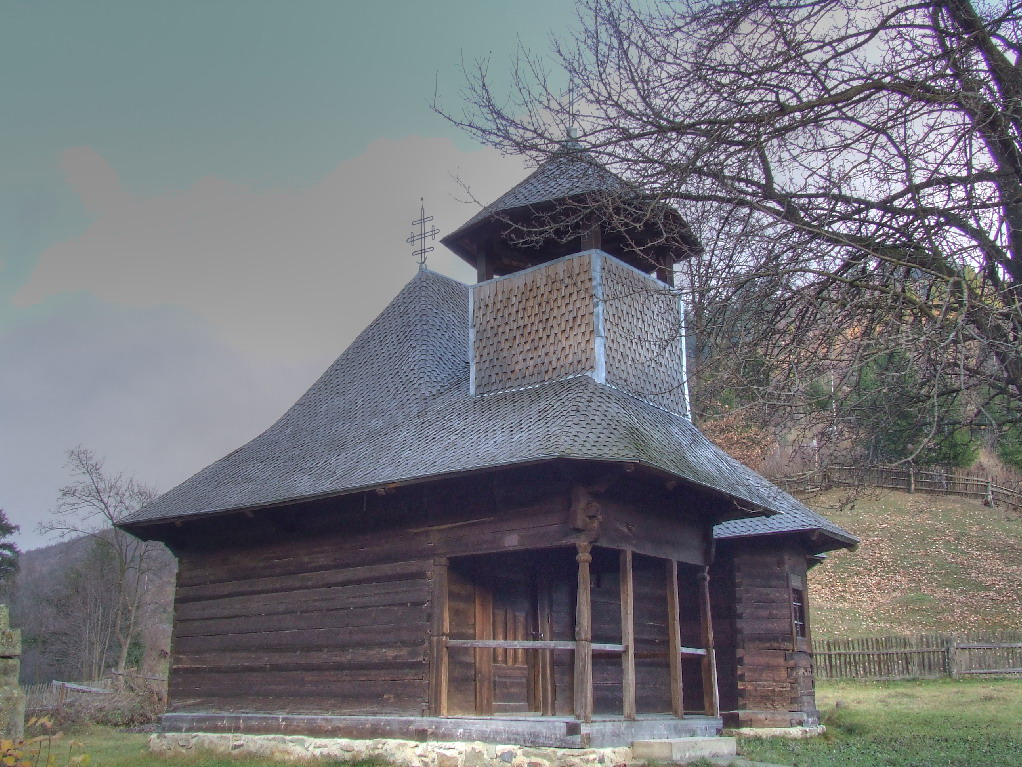
- Romanian Orthodox wooden church

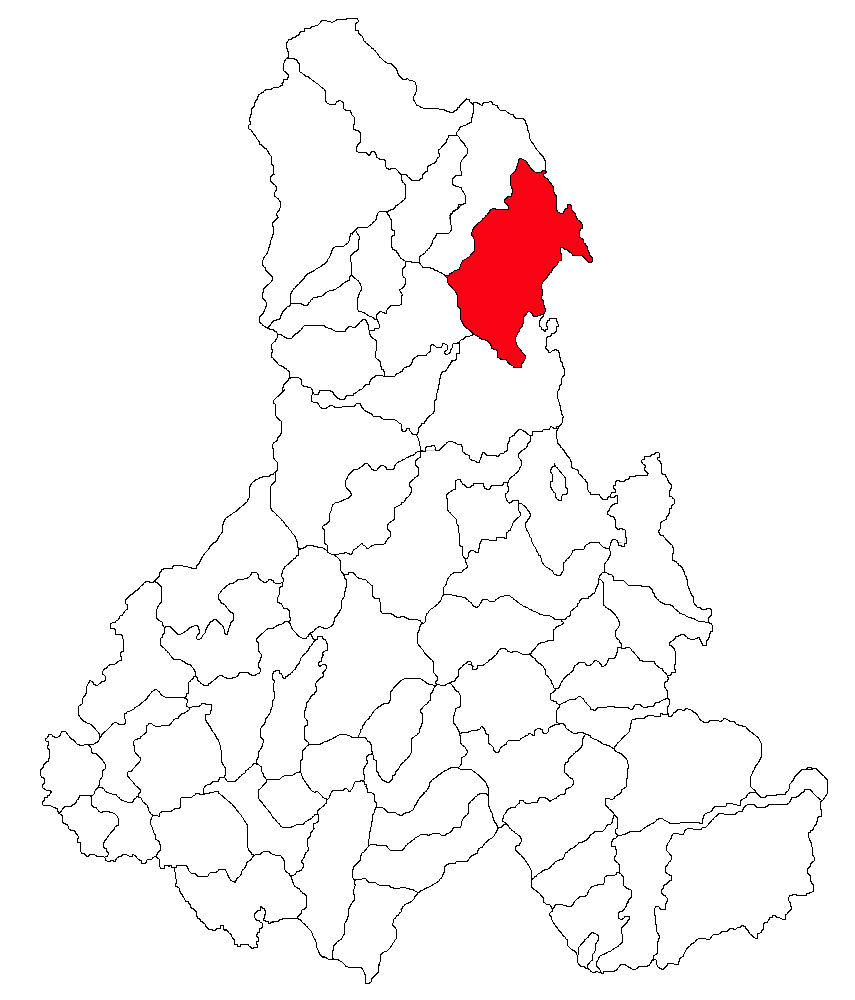
- Location in Harghita County

- Location in Romania
- Coordinates: 46°56′27″N 25°43′3″E
- Country: Romania
- County: Harghita

Government
  - Mayor (2020–2024): Marcel Vancu (PSD)
- Area: 244.47 km^{2} (94.39 sq mi)
- Elevation: 650 m (2,130 ft)
- Population (2021-12-01): 2,941
  - Density: 12.03/km^{2} (31.16/sq mi)
- Time zone: UTC+02:00 (EET)
  - Summer (DST): UTC+03:00 (EEST)
- Postal code: 537330
- Area code: +(40) 266
- Vehicle reg.: HR
- Website: www.tulghes.ro

Tulgheș (Hungarian: Gyergyótölgyes or colloquially Tölgyes, Hungarian pronunciation: [ˈɟɛrɟoːtølɟɛʃ], meaning "place with oak trees in Gyergyó") is a commune in Harghita County, Romania. It lies in eastern Transylvania. The commune is composed of four villages: Hagota (Hágótő), Pintic (Péntekpataka), Recea (Récefalva), and Tulgheș.

== Demography ==
At the 2011 census, 70.8% of inhabitants were Romanians and 28.8% Hungarians (Székelys). At the 2002 census, 65.5% of inhabitants were Romanian Orthodox and 31.3% Roman Catholic. At the 2021 census, Tulgheș had a population of 2,941; of those, 70.59% were Romanians and 25.06% Hungarians.

Tulgheș and Recea have ethnic Romanian majorities with large minorities of ethnic Hungarians, Pintic has an absolute Romanian majority, and Hagota has a Hungarian majority.

== General information ==
Tulgheș commune is situated in the northeast part of Harghita County, at an average altitude of 650 metres (2,130 feet), on the lower part of the Bistricioara River.

This river flows from Călimani from an altitude of 1,350 m (4,430 ft) and crosses a total of 68.5 km (42.6 mi). The Bistricioara River Basin is formed by the streams:

- Putna, largest tributary (around 20 km (12 mi)), which collects water from the mountains: Tătaru, Putna Întunecoasa, Șumuleu, Călugăreni Mic, Balaj, Rezu Mare and Marcu.
- Diacul de Jos, Diacul de Sus, Baratelul and Pintecul, which flows under Mt. Chicera (1,327 m (4,354 ft)), forming the “border” between Mount Higheș and to the east, the Ceahlău Massif.

Tulgheș received its name from the Tulgheș Pass, which links the Hang Depression in Neamț County with the Giurgeu Depression in Harghita County.

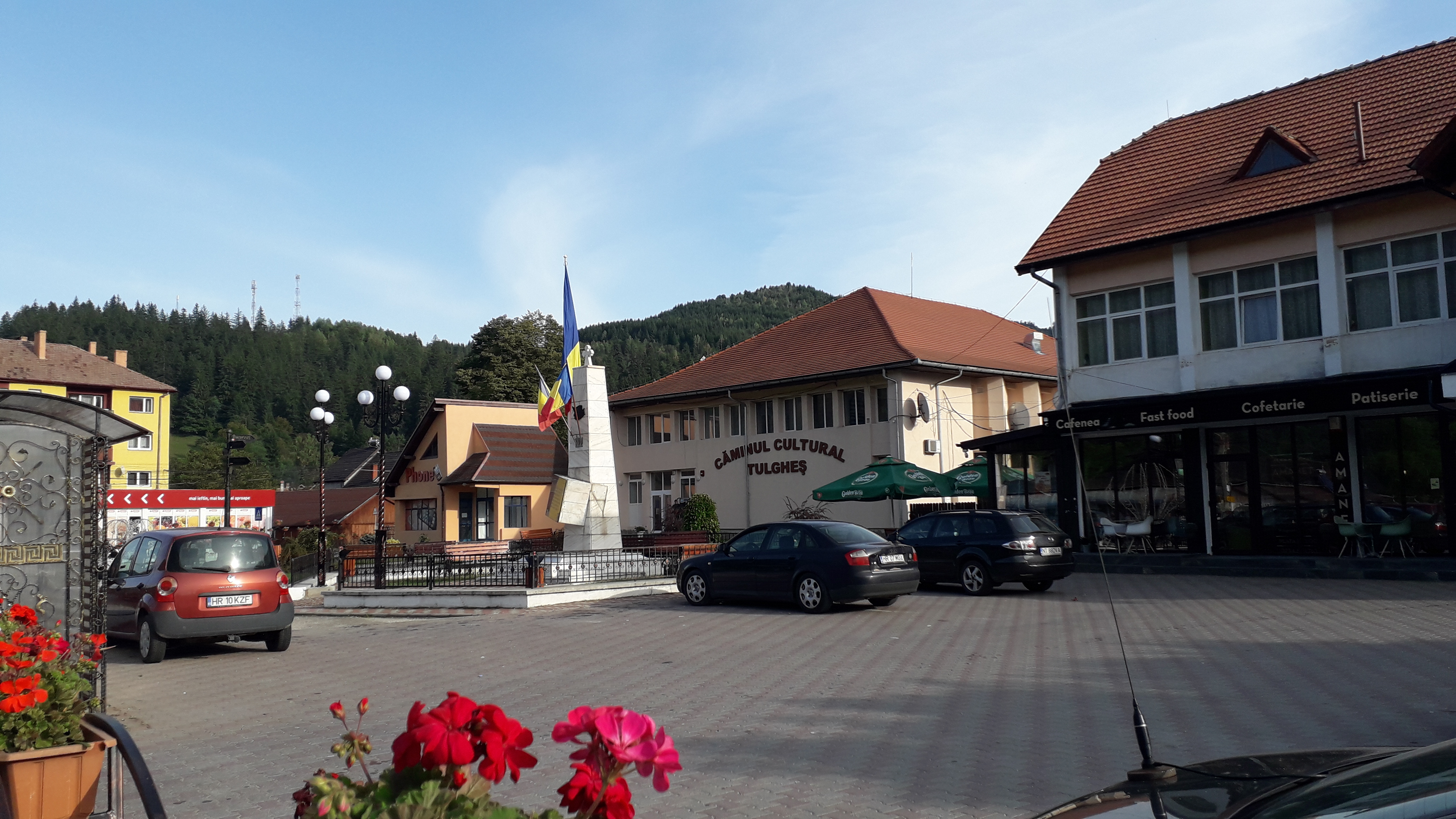
Tulgheș center

== Transportation and important places in the area ==
Transportation in the area is exclusively by road.

- The main highway is national road DN15, which first ascends from the Bistricioara Valley toward Creanga Pass, then descends into Toplița and DN12, then on to the Mureș Valley. East of Tulgheș, DN15 arrives in Poiana Largului and connects with DN17B toward Vatra Dornei, DN15C toward Târgu Neamț, and continues then to the Bistrița Valley toward Bicaz, Piatra Neamț and Bacău.
- County road DJ127 rises via the Putna River Valley toward Tengheler Pass and descends into Ditrău and DN12.
- DJ127A, most easily traversed with an off-road vehicle, ascends via the Balaj River Valley toward the Balaj Pass then descends toward Bicazu Ardelean and DN12C.

Nearby notable cities include: Borsec (20 km (12 mi)), Bilbor (45 km (28 mi) via Borsec and then DJ144A), Toplița (45 km), Ditrău (34 km (21 mi) via DJ127), Gheorgheni (47 km (29 mi) via DJ127 81 km (50 mi) via Toplița).

Larger cities in the area include: Piatra Neamț (93 km (58 mi)), Târgu Neamț (69 km (43 mi)), Vatra Dornei (109 km (68 mi) via the Bistrița Valley, 89 km (55 mi) via Borsec-Creanga Pass-Bilbor on DJ174A).

== Geomorphological and climatic highlights ==
The mountains around the village are:

- To the east: Borsec Mountains, the northern sector from the Gurghiu Mountains through Rezu Mare Peak – Round Batca Mountains (1,386 m (4,547 ft)) with the village's nearest peak – Obcina Mica (1,047 m (3,435 ft)).
- To the south: Hășmaș Mountains, the northwest group through Tulgheș Peak – Mt. Higheș (1,502 m (4,928 ft)) – with the village's nearest peaks – Preluca Mare (1,088 m (3,570 ft)) and Bâtca Pițului (1,040 m (3,410 ft)).
- To the north: The Mountains of Bistrița, which are bordered by the Bistricioara River to the southwest; the Rock of Comarnic, which resembles a ruined citadel (1,519 m (4,984 ft)); the Comarnic Plateau, which lies to the southwest of the Red Rock (1,296 m (4,252 ft)).
- The Ceahlău Massif

The climate is specific to mountain zones with cool summers (average temperature of 14-16 degrees C in July) and moderate winters.

The average annual temperature ranges from 5-6 degrees C, and the average rainfall is about 1000mm/m2. There is snow on the ground 80–100 days per year, with an average thickness of 250 cm in the higher mountain altitudes. Due to the shelter of the mountains surrounding it, The Corbu-Tulgheș Depression receives more favorable weather conditions than in the Giurgeu Depression of the Upper Mureș Valley, where temperatures are much lower.

== Economic highlights ==
The primary economic source is the development of local natural resources. However, a secondary source is pastoral farming and vegetable farming practiced in private households, where a smaller yield is cultivated because the primary goal is sustainability.

On the way toward Mt. Grințieș via the Primatar River Valley on the perimeter of Preluca Ursului, there is a uranium deposit with two areas of experimental exploration: Primatar I and II, which are currently in preservation.

The community also benefits from a post office and several private trade shops, including a barber, shoemaker and blacksmith.

== Historical highlights ==
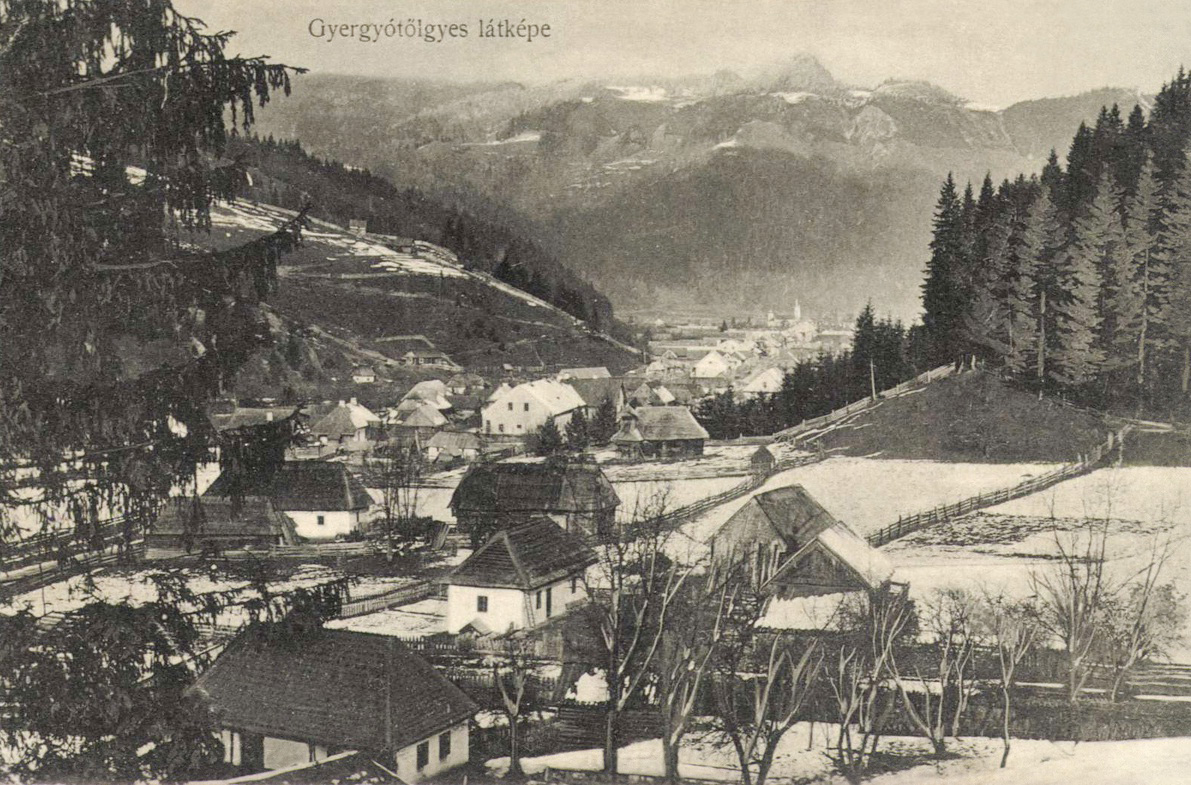
Tulgheș viewed from the Putna Valley, 1914

The community of Tulgheș developed after the 17th century, mainly in the 19th century when there was a change in the local Transcarpathian roads. At the end of the 18th century, the Priska Pass used to be the gateway for travelers by foot and horseback. The official customs and quarantine office was on Mt. Priska (Piricske) between Putna and Belcina. Those coming from Gheorgheni (Gyergyószentmiklós) used to climb up Mount Tătarul (Tatárhágó) and then descend via the Putna Valley, and, through Tulgheș, arrived in Moldavia. The Transylvanian checkpoint at Priska moved in 1806 toward Gura Putnei in Tulgheș, while the Moldovan checkpoint moved to Prisecani (1792).

The population flood from the Mureș corridor (Romanian and Székely) and from the Bistrița Valley took over the existing Romanian population in Tulgheș.

The name, which comes from “Oak Tree” after the oak forest found on the southern slope of the foothills of the Bistrița Mountains toward the Bistricioara Valley, originates from the Hungarian Tölgyes. However, it was later renamed officially Tulgheș after 1920, similar to Rezu Mare (Nagyréz), Pârâul Mărului (Marpatak), Gyergótölgyes, etc.

== Opportunities ==
In the Tulgheș area, there are 30 mineral springs, of which 11 have been recorded and inventoried. The current bioclimate also makes the area suitable for spas. The most important springs are Șesul Comarnicului, Laurențiu, Branea, Prisecani, Diacul de Sus, Diacul de Jos, Cibeni, Șandoreni and Rezu Mare.

== Touristic landmarks and memorials ==
- Military Memorial dedicated to the Romanian Heroes from the First World War can be found in the village along DJ127, above the former Hungarian barracks built in the years 1942/1943 and next to where the Marc River empties into the Putna River. The reburial of fallen soldiers (originally buried on Mt. Higheș) was done in 1989 with honors. Here are buried 49 soldiers from the 28th Infantry Brigade, who were killed in the area battles in Valea Jidanului, Covorea, Valea Putnei, Pietrele Roșii and Baret. The memorial includes a memorial cross, unveiled in 1916. It stands 1.3m tall and is made of granite. In the foreground of the commemorative cross is inscribed “War heroes to complete the race. 1914-1919.” The small wooden church at the Military Cemeteray dates back to 1790, itself a historical monument.
- Piatra Roșie Reservation (1,215m): gliding, climbing, sightseeing
- Piatra Runcului (1,296m)
- Platoul Comarnicului (Comarnic Plateau)
- Protected area of pedunculate oaks (Quercus pedunculiflora), which is expecting the declaration of preserve status, is situated on the exposed, southern slopes of the Bistricioara Valley and covers about 77 hectares.
- Hungarian Army Barracks (1942/1944). Also formerly a tuberculosis hospital, it is currently used as a psychiatric hospital. In the past, it was also used for the accommodation of 2,000-3,000 Greek children, who became orphans during the Greek Civil War (1946-1949).
- The Romanian Orthodox church dedicated to the Assumption (built in 1882)
- An Armenian family crypt, which is near the Romanian Orthodox church
- The lime kiln in Valea Frumoasă dating back to the 18th century
- Water mill dating from the 18th century, which still works today
- A clock tower, in which the clock is made of wood
- Former “Tulgheș Inn,” currently at the Sibiu Museum of Culture and Civilization
- There is also recreational fishing in the area.
- A locally owned hunting cabin on the property of Romsilva, which is included in the tourist circuit.

== Natives ==
- Alexandru Nicolescu (1882–1941), bishop of the Greek-Catholic Church.

== Bibliography ==
- Primăria Comunei Tulgheș
- Strategia de dezvoltare locala a comunei Tulghes pentru perioada 2007 – 2013
- Despre Tulgheș pe Portalul eComunitate
- Informații de pe teren culese de turiști
- Hărți Munții Bistriței
- Sudul Munților Bistriței - Pietrele Roșii și Platoul Comarnicului
- Sudul Munților Bistriței - Piatra Runcului
- Colecția Munții Noștri - Nr. 16 Hășmaș, Emilian Cristea, Editura Sport-Turism, București, 1978
- Colecția Munții Noștri - Nr. 7 Munții Giurgeului, Marcu Ovidiu, Editura Sport-Turism, București, 1974
