= Dobreanu River =

Dobreanu River may refer to:

- Dobreanu River (Bistricioara)
- Dobreanu River (Neamț)

== See also ==
- Dobrenaș River
- Dobre (disambiguation)
