= Buzești =

Buzești may refer to several villages in Romania:

- Buzești, a village in the commune Crasna, Gorj County
- Buzești, a village in the commune Fărcașa, Maramureș County
- Buzești, a village in the commune Corbu, Olt County
