= Târg =

Romanian periodic fair

A târg was a medieval Romanian periodic fair or a market town. Originally established on the places where periodic fairs were held, some of them (but not all) became permanent settlements, as craftsmen built their workshops near the place where the fair was held.

The market towns were still largely agricultural, with the lord of the settlement allowing some inhabitants to become tradesmen or craftsmen in exchange of some fees. Some of the towns were fortified and became known as cities or fortresses (cetăți).

Many of the earliest fairs were named after the river that flowed nearby. Examples include:

- Târgul Moldovei, on Moldova River (currently known as Baia)
- Târgu Mureș, on Mureș River
- Târgu Jiu, on Jiu River
- Târgul Argeşului, on Argeș River (currently known as Curtea de Argeş)
- Târgu Neamț, on Neamț River
- Târgu Lăpuș, on Lăpuș River
- Cetatea Dâmboviței, on Dâmbovița River (historical name for Bucharest)
- Cetatea Sucevei, on Suceava River (currently known as Suceava)
- Târgul Bârladului, on Bârlad River (currently known as Bârlad)
- Târgul Siretului, on Siret River (currently known as Siret)

== See also ==
- German: Markt
- Hungarian: mezőváros
- Latin: oppidum
- Târgu, for contemporary places with this name
