= Afinișul River =

Afinișul River may refer to:

- Afinișul River, a tributary of the Bistriţa River in Romania
- Afinișul River, a tributary of the Nemțișor River in Romania
