= Asod =

Asod may refer to:

- Asod River, river in Romania
- Asud, Mongol clan of Alani origin
