= Malnaș River =

Malnaș River may refer to:

- Malnaș, a tributary of the Olt in Covasna County
- Malnaș, a tributary of the Pârâul Vinului in Harghita County

== See also ==
- Malnaș
