= Iugani =

Iugani may refer to several villages in Romania:

- Iugani, a village in Mircești Commune, Iaşi County
- Iugani, a village in Boghești Commune, Vrancea County
