= Târgu =

Târgu (Romanian for "the market") starts off the names of several places in Romania:

- Târgu Bujor
- Târgu Cărbunești
- Târgu Frumos
- Târgu Gânguleşti
- Târgu Jiu
- Târgu Lăpuș
- Târgu Logreşti
- Târgu Mureș
- Târgu Neamț
- Târgu Ocna
- Târgu Secuiesc
- Târgu Trotuș

== See also ==
- Târg
