= Argestru River =

Argestru River may refer to:

- Argestru River (Bistrița)
- Argestru River (Bistricioara)

== See also ==
- Argestru, a village in Vatra Dornei city, Suceava County, Romania
