= Milcoveni =

Milcoveni may refer to several villages in Romania:

- Milcoveni, a village in Berliște Commune, Caraș-Severin County
- Milcoveni, a village in Corbu Commune, Olt County
