= Pluton-Dolhești =

- Location within Romania

Location
- Country: Romania
- Counties: Neamț County
- Villages: Pluton, Dolhești

Physical characteristics
- Mouth: Neamț
  - location: Pipirig
  - coordinates: 47°13′41″N 26°05′22″E
  - elevation: 567 m (1,860 ft)
- Length: 14 km (8.7 mi)
- Basin size: 69 km^{2} (27 sq mi)

Basin features
- Progression: Neamț→ Moldova→ Siret→ Danube→ Black Sea
- Tributaries
  - left: Cotnărel
  - right: Tărâțeni, Petru Vodă, Mihăeț

The Pluton-Dolhești (Romanian pronunciation: [pluˈton dolˈheʃtʲ]) is a right tributary of the river Neamț in Romania. It flows into the Neamț in Pipirig. Its length is 14 km (8.7 mi) and its basin size is 69 km^{2} (27 sq mi).
