= Vasau =

Vasau or Vasău may refer to:

- Daniel Vasau (born 1982), Tongan rugby league player
- Vasău River, Romanian river
