= Horațiu Giurgiu =

Romanian basketball player (1938–2024)

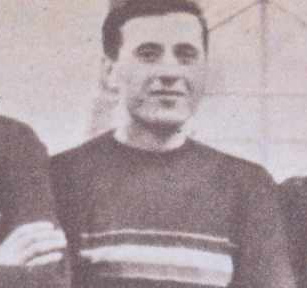
Horațiu Giurgiu in 1965

Horațiu Giurgiu (23 May 1938 – 28 March 2024) was a Romanian basketball player. He was born in Bilbor. With the Romania men's național team he played in two editions of the European Championships (1961, 1963). He died on 28 March 2024, at the age of 85.
