= Romul Nuțiu =

Romul Nuțiu (July 28, 1932 – April 5, 2012) was one of the most constant artists dedicated to Abstraction from the Romanian art scene. Even though he had not left the country to work abroad during his lifetime, his international career has risen since 2008, when he started a fruitful collaboration with Joana Grevers, art dealer and historian based in Munich, Germany.

== Life ==
Son of a forester and a housewife from Bilbor, Harghita County, Nuțiu attended the primary school from Cașva village, Mureș County in 1938. In 1940, following the Second Vienna Award and the transfer of Northern Transylvania to Hungary, he took refuge in Blaj. After settling in Reghin in 1941, he graduated from the Petru Maior Pedagogical High School at the end of the 1940s.

From 1951 to 1957, he studied at the Ion Andreescu Fine Arts Institute in Cluj, with the professors Petru Feier and Teodor Harsia. Leon Vreme, Paul Sima, Mircea Balau, Vasile Pop Szilagy, Alexandru Cristea, Edwin Solomon, and Sofia Kryzanowska were among his colleagues.

In 1957, he settled in Timișoara, where he participated for the first time at the Annual Fine Arts Salon, where he exhibited permanently since then. With the occasion of the salon opening, he met Catul Bogdan, Alexandru Ciucurencu, Petru Comarnescu, and Romul Ladea. In 1958, he pursued a documentation and specialisation stage at the Nicolae Grigorescu Fine Arts Institute in Bucharest, with professor Alexandru Ciucurencu.

In 1960, he started teaching at the Fine Arts High School in Timișoara, working besides the professor Julius Podlipny, and having a good pedagogical collaboration with him. In 1961, he also became a lecturer at the University in Timișoara, Graphics Department, until 1979. In the same year, he became a member of Visual Artists' Union of Romania.

In 1962, he married Felicia Bircea, also a teacher and they had a daughter, Simona, born in 1966, who also became an active artist later on.

Starting from 1968, he was the author of a few important murals and decorative works along the country – the Railway Station Hall in Băile Herculane, with a ceramic mosaic, entitled Tradition, a monumental art project – Science, Literature and Art, transposed in colored cements technique, together with Gabriel Kazynczy (1973), an ensemble of two monumental works at the Orizont Hotel in Predeal, with the theme 'horizon' and 'the tree' (1977) or the 1986's monumental artwork Mapamond, in the al secco technique, designed for Timișoara International Airport and created along with the artist Lidia Ciolac.

In 1992, he was named professor at the Art Faculty of West University in Timișoara, in the Painting Department, until 1998, when he retired. He returned as a professor at Tibiscus University, the Design Faculty, and from 2002 he was an associate professor at the West University again.

In 2008, he started a fruitful collaboration with art dealer and historian Joana Grevers, owner of the Contemporary Art Gallery in Bucharest, and he was constantly shown in solo shows and projects until his death in 2012.

== Artistic biography ==
His career evolved from the early sixties, when he was a young artist, eager to experience new ways of relating to painting and continued fluently until his death in 2012. Even though there are variations of style and appraisal, his painting had always been vivid, colourful and tenacious.

'The artistic biography of Romul Nuțiu lays under the sign of a happy exception', said art historian Ruxandra Demetrescu. "In the 7th decade of the last century he was one of the first Romanian artists that had professed the Abstract Expressionism and/or European Informal. He remained faithful to abstraction in general and then he converted painting into object. The innovative character corresponds naturally in his case with that of an avantgardist (even in the literal sense of the word)." In the 1970s, in Timișoara, a few artists acknowledge and try to change the moral hazard of political strategies. For Nuțiu, the personal input is abstract. The relationship history/present, the studio poetics, the new approach of the artistic medium, image as material are syntagms for what painting and object painting represent. In order to understand the concept in regard to the 1970s slang, one must admit the decisive personal approach of painting.

== Abstract Expressionism beneath the Iron Curtain ==
The relation to Abstract Expressionism and Art Informel is best described by the artist: "In 1957, when I graduated, my belief was strictly connected to the idea that the perception of things is rather important for the creation act, but being limited, one has to appeal to the subconscious through experiment, challenge and transcendence. My informal was born from hard work and devotion. At that moment, I knew few things about contemporary art, and what I learned in school was just some academic knowledge that was only partially useful. Later on, when I started to travel, I came in contact with the European informal. In the big museums I found out that my way was somehow synchronized, having a polarity to what I was seeing. Abstract expressionism and the European informal made me understand that I have to keep my own authenticity and sensitivity."

== Painting – Object – Sculpture – Environment ==
Periods and Styles of Nuțiu's oeuvre. Following Nuțiu's oeuvre through the decades helped to define the different stages of his artistic unfolding. The first steps towards abstraction were the modular compositions from the early 1960s, all of which were paintings on canvas. At the same time he also created objects called assemblage, by using different canvases stuck on each other which created a three dimensional effect. Nutiu was always tempted to expand his works beyond the canvas, by leaving the bi-dimensionality. He referred to the works of this period as Utopias.

After composing these objects he returned to painting and began a theme called Dynamic Universe; these paintings were made in the 1970s. In this period Nuțiu decided to build several vessels with dimensions of about 160x160 cm having a depth of 10 cm, which he filled with water and industrial paints that were usually used to paint cars. These colours could not be absorbed by the water, and floated by their own inertia creating unforeseen shapes. The artist influenced those shapes by intervening with a bar until he liked the outcome. Subsequently, he arranged a canvas on the water's surface. The canvas absorbed the paint composition which was a moment earlier in the water. Generally the canvas was covered entirely of these "risky effects" produced in print. In some cases Nuțiu intervened with a few brushstrokes or he erased some areas. The very innovative object in space Șapte forme pictate (Seven painted shapes) from 1969 was also achieved with this technology transfer in water, while some areas have been painted over. In the 1980s Nuțiu was inspired by vegetal structures, especially roots and he subsequently labelled this phase of his artistic production as Sections through Fertile Soil. This title clearly reveals that his abstract works were inspired by nature. Further to this title he was also a passionate fly fisherman and he confessed that the roots of the plants and trees he observed on the other side of the shore inspired him. In the 1990s, Nuțiu entitled his body of work Beyond Appearances. The paintings became more graphic and symbolical which is evidenced seen in the artwork Blue Universe from 1999. The paintings were of course abstract and in the 1990s extremely colourful, sometimes colour spots surrounded by a line like a cloisonné. At the end of the 1990s he was attracted by water – running in rivers or falling in cascades and until the early 2000s he was extremely engaged with this subject. In the last years of his life Nutiu returned to his earlier themes, one of which was Sections through Fertile Soil. For Romul Nutiu the source of inspiration is especially the plant, its stem and root, as it feeds from the soil and returns fertility to it and in this permanent struggle for survival it is akin to man. He re-explored painting the element of water as he had done at the beginning of the 2000s. In 2011, Nuțiu achieved his largest painting called Dionysiacal Space, which was almost 3 metres long and 2 metres wide. This monumental work is although structured also directed by spontaneous intuition and reveals the semantic complexity of the artist. Throughout his life Nuțiu's art always evolved and challenged himself to try new paths and develop new techniques. Although he used different dimensions of canvases, in his eyes, any surface could become a territory and was able to involve any kind of shades, plans, volumes of colour and different tonalities. This means that he did not need a certain type of canvas or a size as he used his colours and geometrical forms in a way that fit onto every surface. Nutiu had always expressed interest in objects and the objectual space as it could offer him a new field to reveal his spirit. While making objects in space he used the same attitude towards colour, but complicated the conformation so the objects would gain individuality. Sometimes the object could be perceived from all sides and therefore had a higher autonomy. Nuțiu above all remained a painter in everything he did whether he used wood panels or sheets of paper; colour was always one essential dynamic that kept all his works together. He liked to play with colour and transferred all his emotions and tensions into it; this can be seen when one observes the canvas directly. He always painted abstract, gestural resulting in experimental art. Nuțiu also thought about the objectual reality of the image he painted, that there should be a sensitivity to grasp it. His art could be described as a synthesis between lyricism and rationalism. Most of his works have allegorical meanings.

== Auctions ==
- 5 May 2014 – The painting 'Water' (2011, 130 x 129 cm, oil on canvas) was sold for 12,700 EUR at Neumeister Alte-Kunst Moderne, Munich, Germany. Neumeister Alte-Kunst Moderne Auction 2014
- 26 March 2014 – The painting 'Subterranean Vegetal Structure II' (1980, 202 x 162,5 cm, oil on canvas) was sold for 12,500 GBP at Christie's London, UK. Christie's Auction 2014
- 24 September 2013 – The painting 'Blue Dynamic Universe' (1970, 162 x 200 cm, oil on canvas) was sold for 21,250 GBP at Christie's London, UK. Christie's Auction 2013
