= Putna (Bistricioara) =

- Location within Romania

Location
- Country: Romania
- Counties: Harghita County

Physical characteristics
- Source: Giurgeu Mountains
- Mouth: Bistricioara
  - location: Tulgheș
  - coordinates: 46.9664°N 25.7665°E
- Length: 23 km (14 mi)
- Basin size: 175 km^{2} (68 sq mi)

Basin features
- Progression: Bistricioara→ Bistrița→ Siret→ Danube→ Black Sea

The Putna is a right tributary of the river Bistricioara in Romania. Upstream from its confluence with the Putna Întunecoasă in the village of Hagota, it is also called Putna Noroioasă. It discharges into the Bistricioara in Tulgheș. Its length is 23 km (14 mi) and its basin size is 175 km^{2} (68 sq mi).

== Tributaries ==
The following rivers are tributaries to the river Putna (from source to mouth):

- Left: Rezu Mare
- Right: Putna Întunecoasă, Șumuleu, Călugăru Mic, Balaj, Marcu
