= Secu (Neamț) =

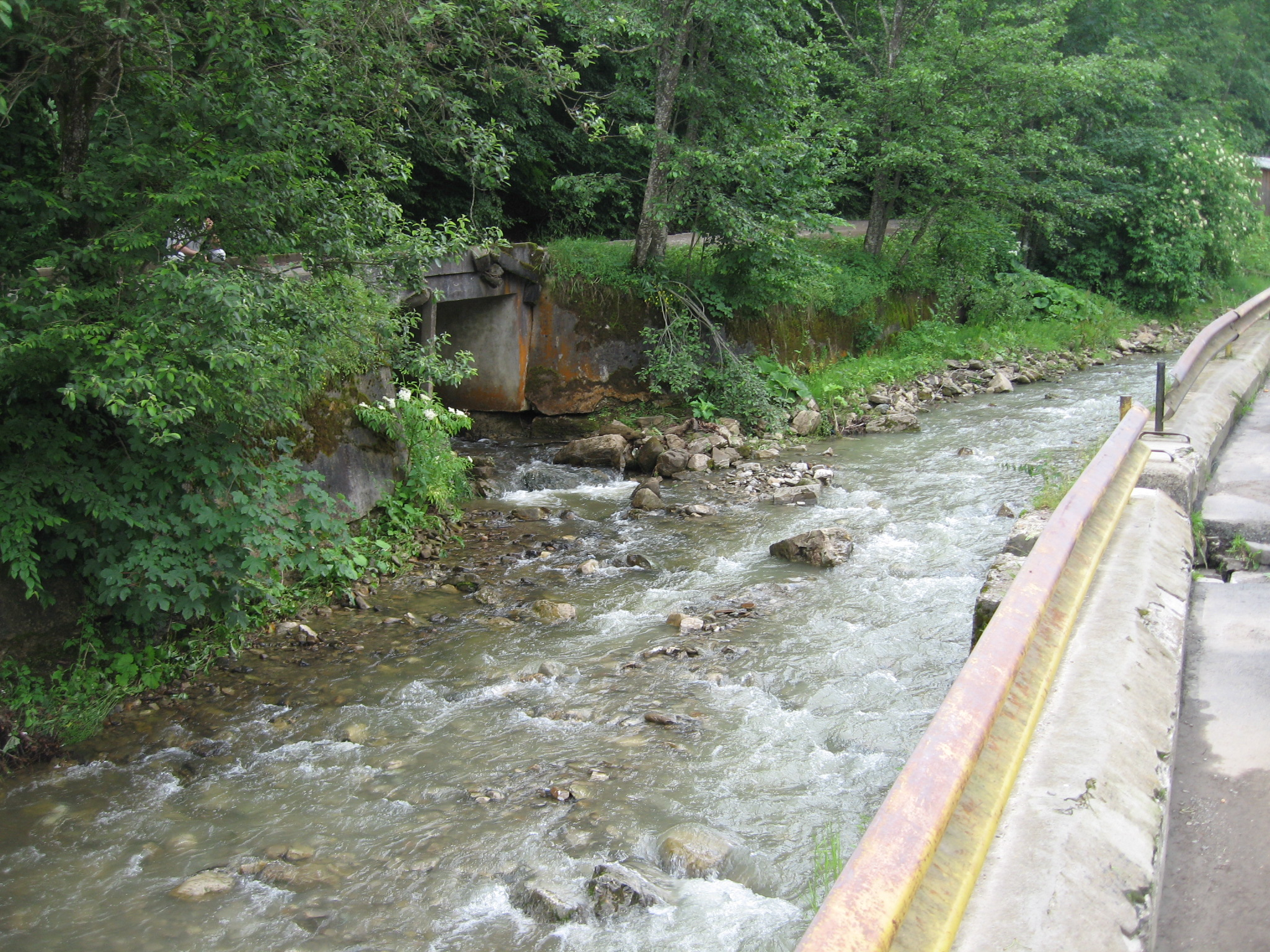

- Location within Romania

Location
- Country: Romania
- Counties: Neamț County

Physical characteristics
- Mouth: Neamț
  - location: Leghin
  - coordinates: 47°13′18″N 26°12′47″E
  - elevation: 532 m (1,745 ft)
- Length: 10 km (6.2 mi)
- Basin size: 37 km^{2} (14 sq mi)

Basin features
- Progression: Neamț→ Moldova→ Siret→ Danube→ Black Sea
- Tributaries
  - left: Glodul Mare, Vasău
  - right: Pârâul Alb, Arșița Mare, Pârâul Rupturilor

The Secu is a right tributary of the river Neamț in Romania. It flows into the Neamț in Leghin. Its length is 10 km (6.2 mi) and its basin size is 37 km^{2} (14 sq mi).
