= Ciorbă (surname) =

Ciorbă is a Romanian surname that may refer to:

- Corina Monica Ciorbă, better known as Corina, Romanian singer
- Sandu Ciorbă (born 1968), Romanian Roma singer
- Toma Ciorbă (1864–1936), Romanian physician and hospital director

== See also ==
- Corbu (disambiguation)
