= Corbești =

Corbeşti may refer to several villages in Romania:

- Corbeşti, a village in Petriș Commune, Arad County
- Corbeşti, a village in Ceica Commune, Bihor County
- Corbeşti, a village in Acățari Commune, Mureș County

== See also ==
- Corb (disambiguation)
