= Grințieș =

- Commune
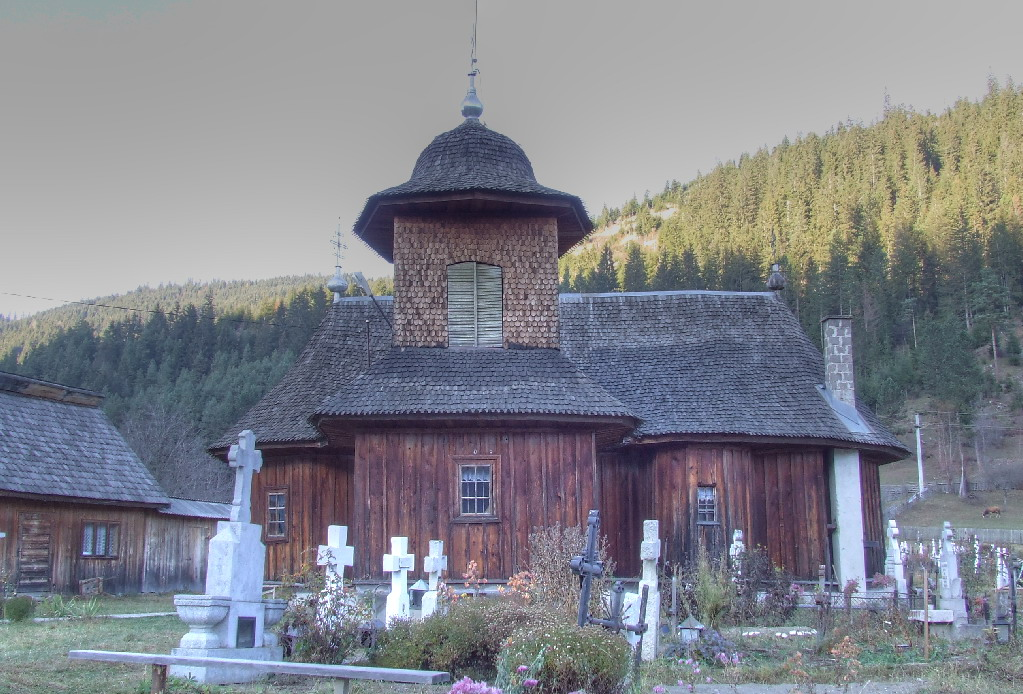
- All Saints' Day wooden church of Grințieș

- Location in Neamț County

- Location in Romania
- Coordinates: 47°3′N 25°52′E
- Country: Romania
- County: Neamț

Government
  - Mayor (2024–2028): Ana Buștihan (PNL)
- Area: 130.99 km^{2} (50.58 sq mi)
- Elevation: 569 m (1,867 ft)
- Population (2021-12-01): 1,925
  - Density: 14.70/km^{2} (38.06/sq mi)
- Time zone: UTC+02:00 (EET)
  - Summer (DST): UTC+03:00 (EEST)
- Postal code: 617230
- Area code: +(40) 233
- Vehicle reg.: NT
- Website: comunagrinties.ro

Grințieș is a commune in Neamț County, Western Moldavia, Romania. It is composed of three villages: Bradu, Grințieș, and Poiana.

The commune is located in the western part of the county, on the border with Harghita County, 48 km (30 mi) from the town of Bicaz and 85 km (53 mi) from the county seat, Piatra Neamț.

Grințieș is situated in the central part of the Eastern Romanian Carpathians, between the Bistrița Mountains and the Ceahlău Massif. It lies on the banks of the Bistricioara, close to where the river joins the Bistrița, at the upper end of Lake Izvorul Muntelui (also known as Lake Bicaz).

The commune is traversed by National Road DN15, which connects Piatra Neamț with the city of Toplița in Harghita County.

The All Saints' Day wooden church of Grințieș dates from 1793.

Historical population
Year	Pop.	±%
1992	2,412	—
2002	2,518	+4.4%
2011	2,213	−12.1%
2021	1,925	−13.0%
Source: Census data

== Natives ==
- Nicolae Ionescu (1820–1905), politician, jurist, and publicist
