= Gabriela Mihalschi =

Romanian handball player (born 1987)

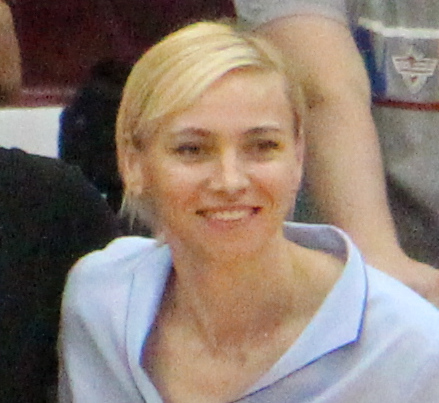

Personal information
- Full name: Gabriela Mihalschi
- Nationality: Romanian
- Born: 22 July 1987 (age 39) Târgu Neamț, Romania
- Height: 1.86 m (6 ft 1 in)

Sport
- Sport: Handball
- Position: Left Back
- Current club: CSM Bistrița

Youth career
- Years: Team
- –2006: CSȘ Târgu Neamț

Senior clubs
- Years: Team
- 2006–2009: HCM Baia Mare
- 2009–2011: SCM Craiova
- 2011–2013: CSM Bucharest
- 2013–2015: HCM Roman
- 2015–2016: HCM Baia Mare
- 2016–2017: CSM Bistrița
National team
- Years: Team
- –: Romania

Gabriela Mihalschi (born 22 July 1987 in Târgu Neamț) is a Romanian handballer. She plays for the Romanian club CSM Bistrița.
