= Teslui, Olt =

Teslui
- Commune
- Seal

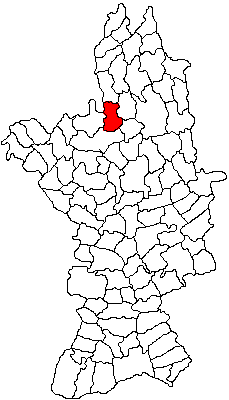
- Location in Olt County

- Location in Romania
- Coordinates: 44°31′N 24°22′E
- Country: Romania
- County: Olt
- Area: 57.5 km^{2} (22.2 sq mi)
- Population (2021-12-01): 2,490
  - Density: 43.3/km^{2} (112/sq mi)
- Time zone: UTC+02:00 (EET)
  - Summer (DST): UTC+03:00 (EEST)
- Vehicle reg.: OT

Teslui is a commune in Olt County, Muntenia, Romania. It is composed of seven villages: Cherleștii din Deal, Cherleștii Moșteni, Comănița, Corbu, Deleni, Schitu Deleni and Teslui.
