= Neamț (Moldova) =

Neamț Ozana
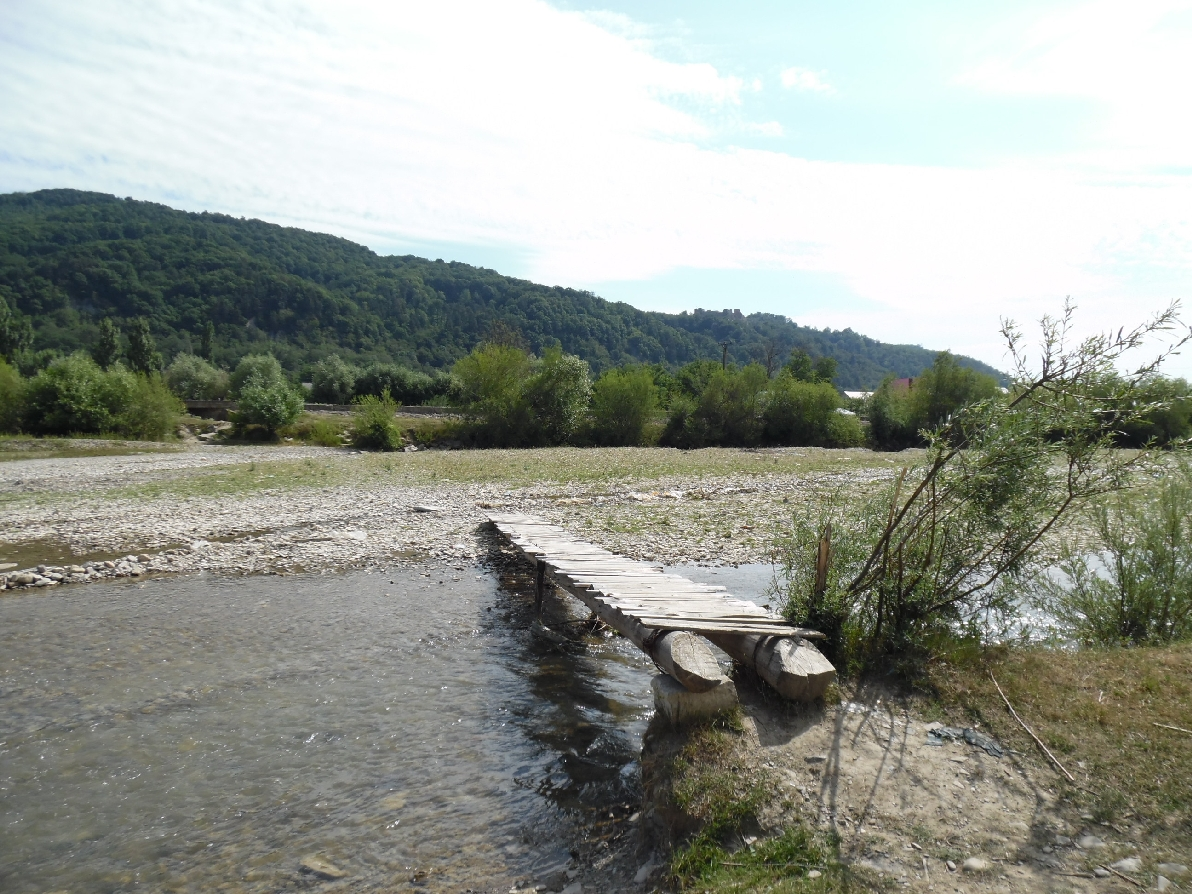

- Location within Romania

Location
- Country: Romania
- Counties: Neamț County
- Towns: Târgu Neamț

Physical characteristics
- Mouth: Moldova
  - location: Timișești
  - coordinates: 47°14′20″N 26°33′24″E
  - elevation: 276 m (906 ft)
- Length: 28 km (17 mi)
- Basin size: 410 km^{2} (160 sq mi)

Basin features
- Progression: Moldova→ Siret→ Danube→ Black Sea
- Tributaries
  - left: Nemțișor
  - right: Pluton-Dolhești

The Neamț or Ozana is a right tributary of the river Moldova in Romania. It discharges into the Moldova near Timișești. It flows through the villages Boboiești, Pipirig, Pâțâligeni, Stânca, Leghin, Lunca, Vânători-Neamț, Dumbrava, Timișești and the town Târgu Neamț. Its length is 28 km (17 mi), and its basin area is 410 km^{2} (160 sq mi).

== Tributaries ==
The following rivers are tributaries to the river Neamț:

- Left: Mânzatul Mare, Izvoare, Râul Străjii, Dobreanu, Leghin, Procov, Nemțișor
- Right: Paltin, Dolia, Dolița, Pluton-Dolhești, Bran, Domesnic, Săscuța, Secu, Valea Rea, Drahura (or Cacova)
