= Timișești =

- Commune
- Location in Neamț County

- Location in Romania
- Coordinates: 47°14′N 26°33′E
- Country: Romania
- County: Neamț
- Subdivisions: Timișești, Dumbrava, Plăieșu, Preutești, Zvorănești

Government
  - Mayor (2024–2028): Vasile Mărculeț (PNL)
- Area: 25.76 km^{2} (9.95 sq mi)
- Elevation: 280 m (920 ft)
- Population (2021-12-01): 3,802
  - Density: 147.6/km^{2} (382.3/sq mi)
- Time zone: UTC+02:00 (EET)
  - Summer (DST): UTC+03:00 (EEST)
- Postal code: 617470
- Area code: +40 x33
- Vehicle reg.: NT
- Website: comunatimisesti.eu

Timișești is a commune in Neamț County, Western Moldavia, Romania. It is composed of five villages: Dumbrava, Plăieșu, Preutești, Timișești and Zvorănești.

Historical population
Year	Pop.	±%
1992	3,870	—
2002	4,032	+4.2%
2011	3,492	−13.4%
2021	3,802	+8.9%
Source: Census data
