= Corbu (Bistricioara) =

- Location within Romania

Location
- Country: Romania
- Counties: Harghita County
- Villages: Corbu

Physical characteristics
- Mouth: Bistricioara
  - coordinates: 46.9905°N 25.6811°E
- Length: 14 km (8.7 mi)
- Basin size: 35 km^{2} (14 sq mi)

Basin features
- Progression: Bistricioara→ Bistrița→ Siret→ Danube→ Black Sea
- Tributaries
  - right: Bâtca

The Corbu is a right tributary of the river Bistricioara in Romania. It flows into the Bistricioara in the village Corbu. Its length is 14 km (8.7 mi) and its basin size is 35 km^{2} (14 sq mi).
