= Corbeni (disambiguation) =

Corbeni may refer to the following places in Romania:

- Corbeni, a commune in Argeș County
- Corbeni, a village in the commune Racovița, Brăila County
- Corbeni, a village in the town Balș, Olt County
- Corbeni (river), a river in Bihor County
