= Vânători-Neamț =

- Commune
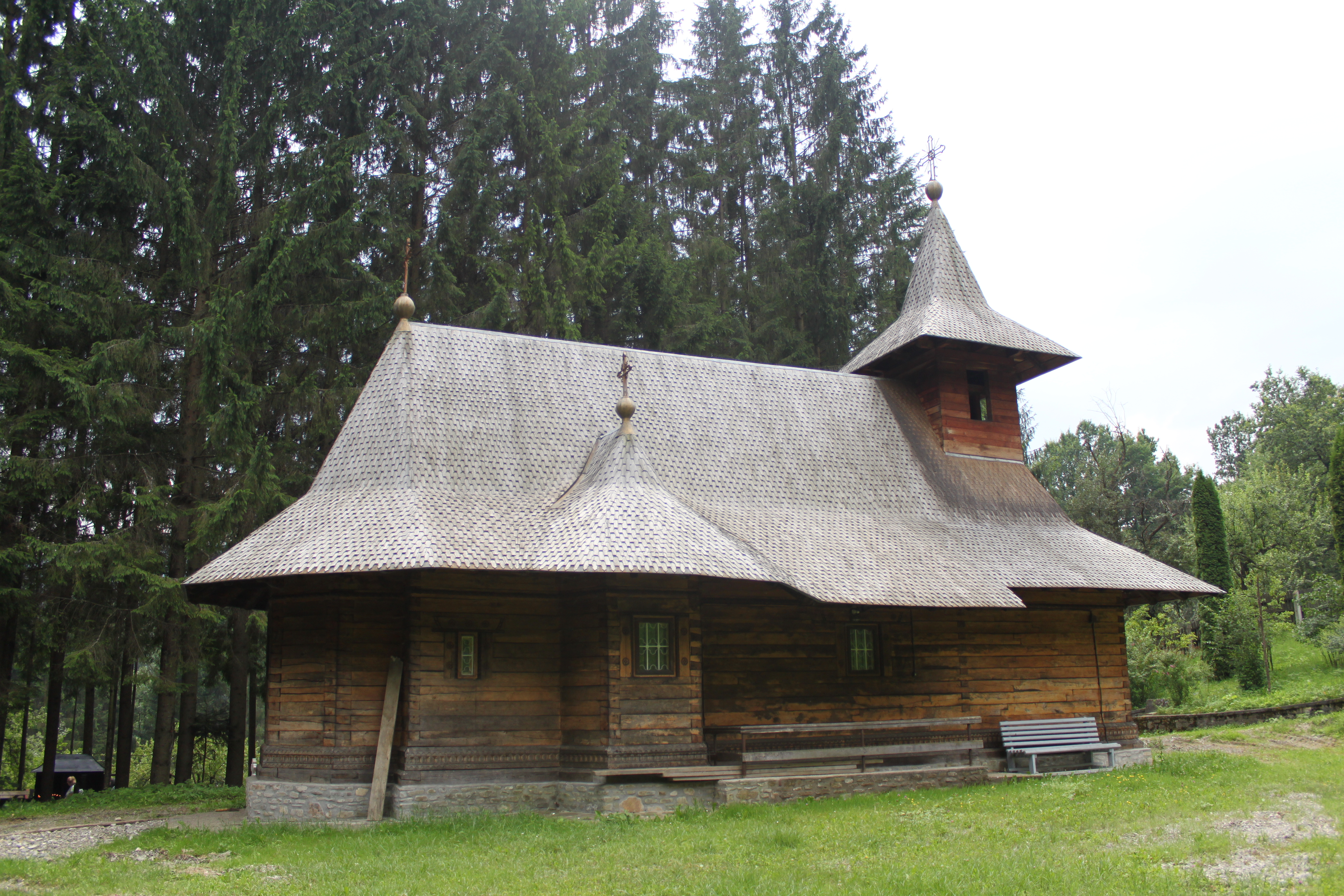
- Sihăstria Secului Monastery

- Location in Neamț County

- Location in Romania
- Coordinates: 47°12′N 26°19′E
- Country: Romania
- County: Neamț

Government
  - Mayor (2024–2028): Maria Petrariu (PSD)
- Area: 167.31 km^{2} (64.60 sq mi)
- Elevation: 400 m (1,300 ft)
- Population (2021-12-01): 7,270
  - Density: 43.5/km^{2} (113/sq mi)
- Time zone: UTC+02:00 (EET)
  - Summer (DST): UTC+03:00 (EEST)
- Postal code: 617500
- Area code: +(40) 233
- Vehicle reg.: NT
- Website: www.vinatorineamt.ro

Vânători-Neamț is a commune in Neamț County, Western Moldavia, Romania. It is composed of four villages: Lunca, Mânăstirea Neamț, Nemțișor, and Vânători-Neamț.

The commune lies on the banks of the river Neamț and its right tributary, Nemțișor. It is located in the northern part of the county, on the border with Suceava County.

Mânăstirea Neamț village is the site of Neamț Monastery.

The Vânători-Neamț Natural Park is partly situated on the territory of the commune; there are 17 European bisons in a protected 180 ha (440 acres) area in Vânători-Neamț.

The Poiana Slatinei site in Lunca village contains the remains of the oldest salt exploitation in the world known to archaeologists, dating back to the Starčevo-Criș culture of the Early Neolithic.

Historical population
Year	Pop.	±%
1992	8,321	—
2002	8,825	+6.1%
2011	7,595	−13.9%
2021	7,270	−4.3%
Source: Census data

== Natives ==
- Theodora of Sihla (born c. 1650 – d. ?), Christian ascetic and Romanian Orthodox saint
