= Pârâul Vinului =

Pârâul Vinului Valea Vinului
- Location within Romania

Location
- Country: Romania
- Counties: Harghita County
- Villages: Borsec

Physical characteristics
- Source: Giurgeu Mountains
- Mouth: Bistricioara
  - location: Capu Corbului
  - coordinates: 46.9969°N 25.6314°E
- Length: 15 km (9.3 mi)
- Basin size: 59 km^{2} (23 sq mi)

Basin features
- Progression: Bistricioara→ Bistrița→ Siret→ Danube→ Black Sea
- Tributaries
  - left: Tinova, Mestecăniș
  - right: Mândra, Malnaș, Andraș Filip

The Pârâul Vinului (also: Valea Vinului) is a right tributary of the river Bistricioara in Romania. It flows into the Bistricioara in Capu Corbului. Its length is 15 km (9.3 mi) and its basin size is 59 km^{2} (23 sq mi).
