= Liliana Corbu =

Romanian volleyball player (born 1975)

Personal information
- Nationality: Romanian
- Born: 17 May 1975 (age 51)
- Height: 177 m (580 ft 9 in)

Volleyball information
- Number: 18 (national team)

Career
Years	Teams
1994	Dacia Pitesti

National team
1994	Romania

Liliana Corbu (born 17 May 1975) is a retired Romanian female volleyball player.

She was part of the Romania women's national volleyball team.

She participated in the 1994 FIVB Volleyball Women's World Championship. On club level she played with Dacia Pitesti.

== Clubs ==
- Dacia Pitesti (1994)
