= Bilbor =

- Commune
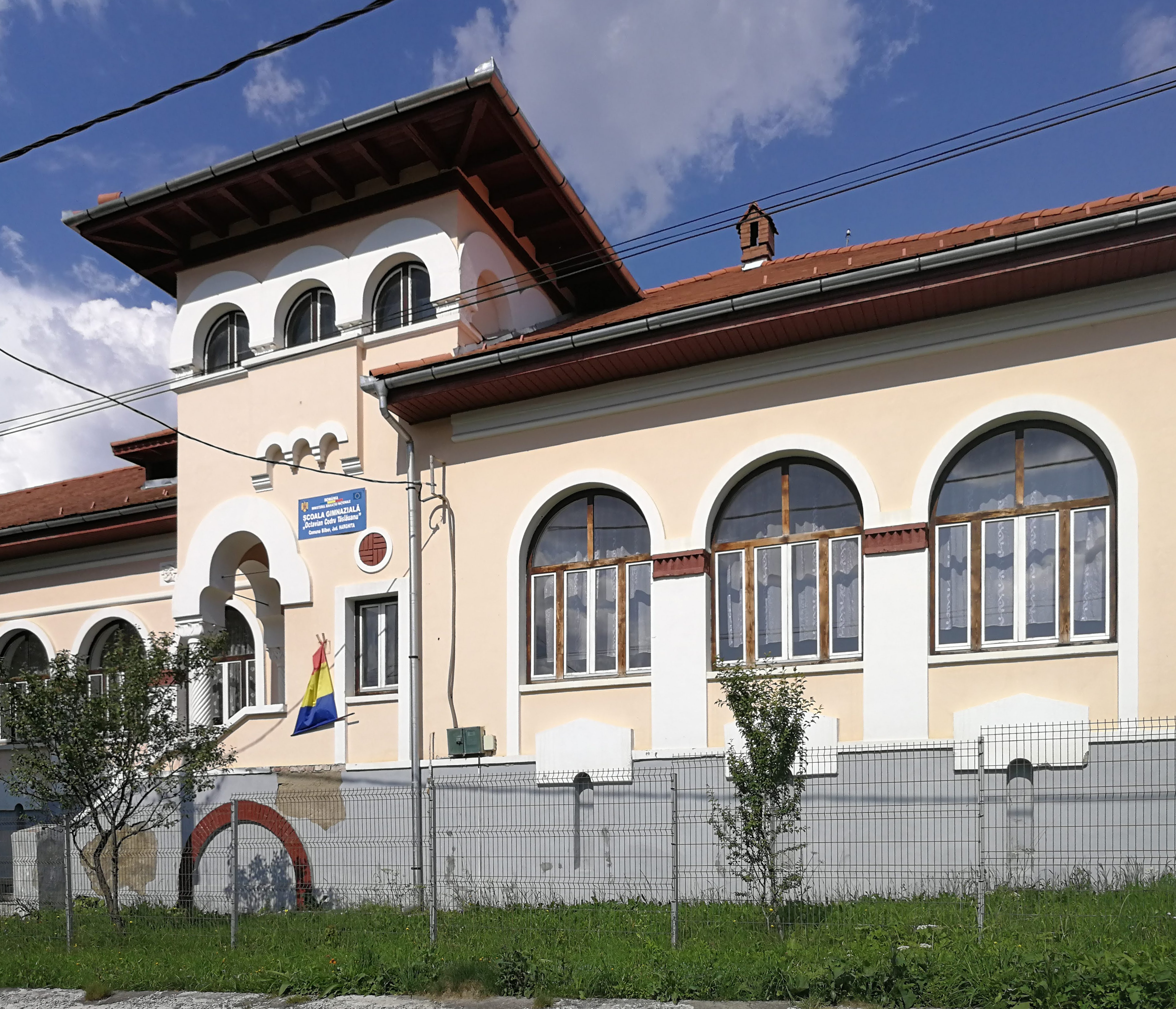
- The Octavian Codru Tăslăuanu School in Bilbor

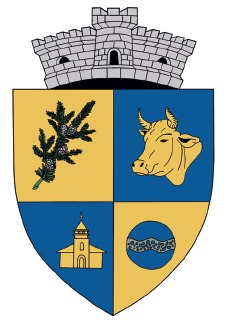
- Coat of arms

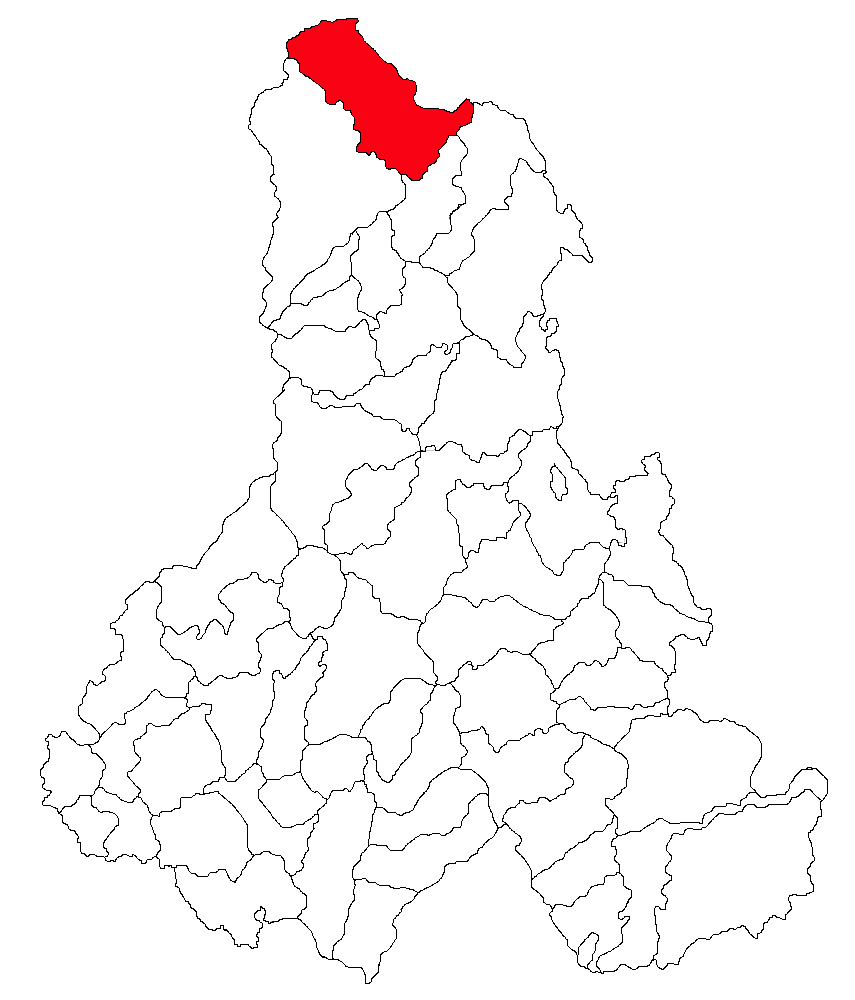
- Location in Harghita County

- Location in Romania
- Coordinates: 47°03′55″N 25°29′25″E
- Country: Romania
- County: Harghita

Government
  - Mayor (2020–2024): Ilie-Daniel Hângan (PNL)
- Area: 227.31 km^{2} (87.76 sq mi)
- Elevation: 917 m (3,009 ft)
- Population (2021-12-01): 2,328
  - Density: 10.24/km^{2} (26.53/sq mi)
- Time zone: UTC+02:00 (EET)
  - Summer (DST): UTC+03:00 (EEST)
- Postal code: 537020
- Area code: +40 x66
- Vehicle reg.: HR
- Website: primariabilbor.ro

Bilbor (Hungarian: Bélbor, Hungarian pronunciation :[ˈbeːlbor]) is a commune in Harghita County, Transylvania, Romania. It is composed of two villages, Bilbor and Răchitiș (Rakottyás).

== Name ==
Its name is of Slavic origin, meaning white pine, derived from *bělъ, white and *borъ, pine.

== Demographics ==
Historical population
Year	Pop.	±%
2002	2,859	—
2011	2,638	−7.7%
2021	2,328	−11.8%
Source: INS, Census data

The commune has an absolute ethnic Romanian majority. According to the 2002 census, it had a population of 2,859; of those, 99.44% were Romanians and 0.55% Hungarians. According to religion, the population was divided as follows: 2,845 Romanian Orthodox, 12 Roman Catholic, 1 Greek Catholic, and 1 Evangelical Lutheran. At the 2021 census, Bilbor had a population of 2,328, of which 92.74% were Romanians.

== Natives ==
- Horațiu Giurgiu (1938–2024), basketball player
- Romul Nuțiu (1932–2012), abstract artist
- Octavian Codru Tăslăuanu (1876–1942), magazine publisher, non-fiction writer, and politician
