= Bistricioara (Siret) =

- Location within Romania

Location
- Country: Romania
- Counties: Harghita, Neamț

Physical characteristics
- Mouth: Bistrița
  - location: Lake Izvorul Muntelui
  - coordinates: 47.060°N 25.938°E
- Length: 64 km (40 mi)
- Basin size: 770 km^{2} (300 sq mi)

Basin features
- Progression: Bistrița→ Siret→ Danube→ Black Sea
- Tributaries
  - right: Putna

The Bistricioara is a right tributary of the river Bistrița in Romania, which it joins at the upper end of Lake Izvorul Muntelui, near the village Bistricioara. It flows through the villages Bilbor, Capu Corbului, Corbu, Tulgheș, Bradu, Grințieș and Bistricioara. Upstream from its confluence with the Borcut, it is also called Răcila. Its length is 64 km (40 mi) and its basin size is 770 km^{2} (300 sq mi).

== Tributaries ==
The following rivers are tributaries to the river Bistricioara:

- Left: Iutași, Vaman, Țigan, Pintii, Argestru, Hărlagii, Muncel, Seaca, Barasău, Prisăcani, Bradu, Grasu, Grințieș, Grințieșul Mic
- Right: Borcut, Dobreanu, Fundoaia, Șeștini, Răchitișul Mic, Răchitișul Mare, Cupele, Pârâul Vinului, Corbu, Asod, Putna, Pintic, Frasin, Moraru
