= Nemțișor =

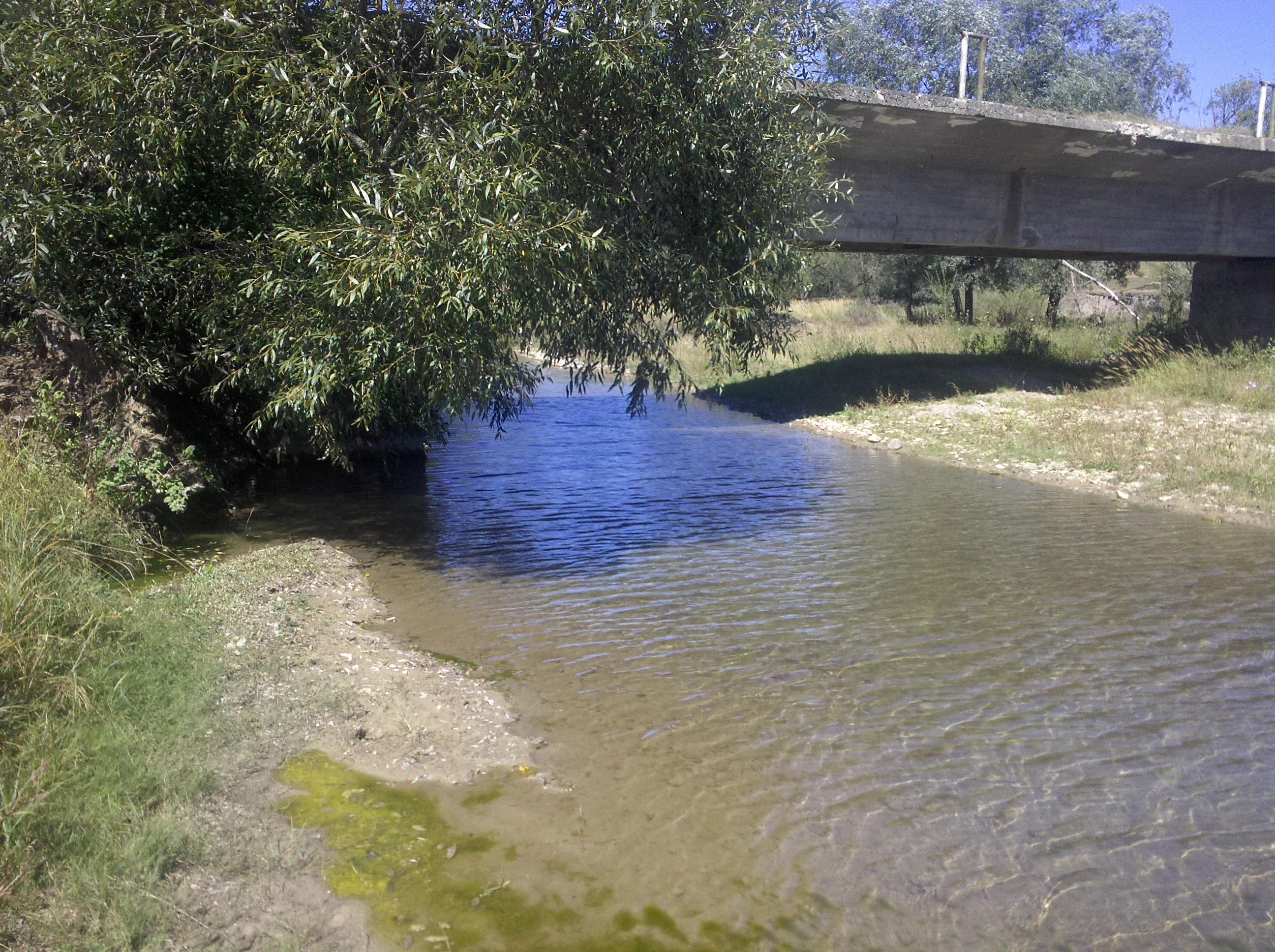

- Location within Romania

Location
- Country: Romania
- Counties: Neamț County
- Villages: Nemțișor, Lunca, Vânători-Neamț

Physical characteristics
- Source
  - elevation: 1,360 m (4,460 ft)
- Mouth: Neamț
  - location: Vânători-Neamț
  - coordinates: 47°13′20″N 26°19′23″E
  - elevation: 392 m (1,286 ft)
- Length: 25 km (16 mi)
- Basin size: 88 km^{2} (34 sq mi)

Basin features
- Progression: Neamț→ Moldova→ Siret→ Danube→ Black Sea

The Nemțișor is a left tributary of the river Neamț (Ozana) in Romania. It discharges into the Neamț in Lunca, near Vânători-Neamț. Its length is 25 km (16 mi) and its basin size is 88 km^{2} (34 sq mi).

== Tributaries ==
The following rivers are tributaries to the river Nemțișor:

- Left: Strungăria, Rusul Mic, Alunișu, Chilia, Huma, Iftimia, Cărbunele, Chiriac, Pârâul Sec, Bodei, Neamțu
- Right: Paltinul (or Jacotele), Icoana, Afinișul, Nil, Zaplazul, Cardacul, Maghernița, Pârâul Puturos, Trapezia
