= Boghești =

- Commune
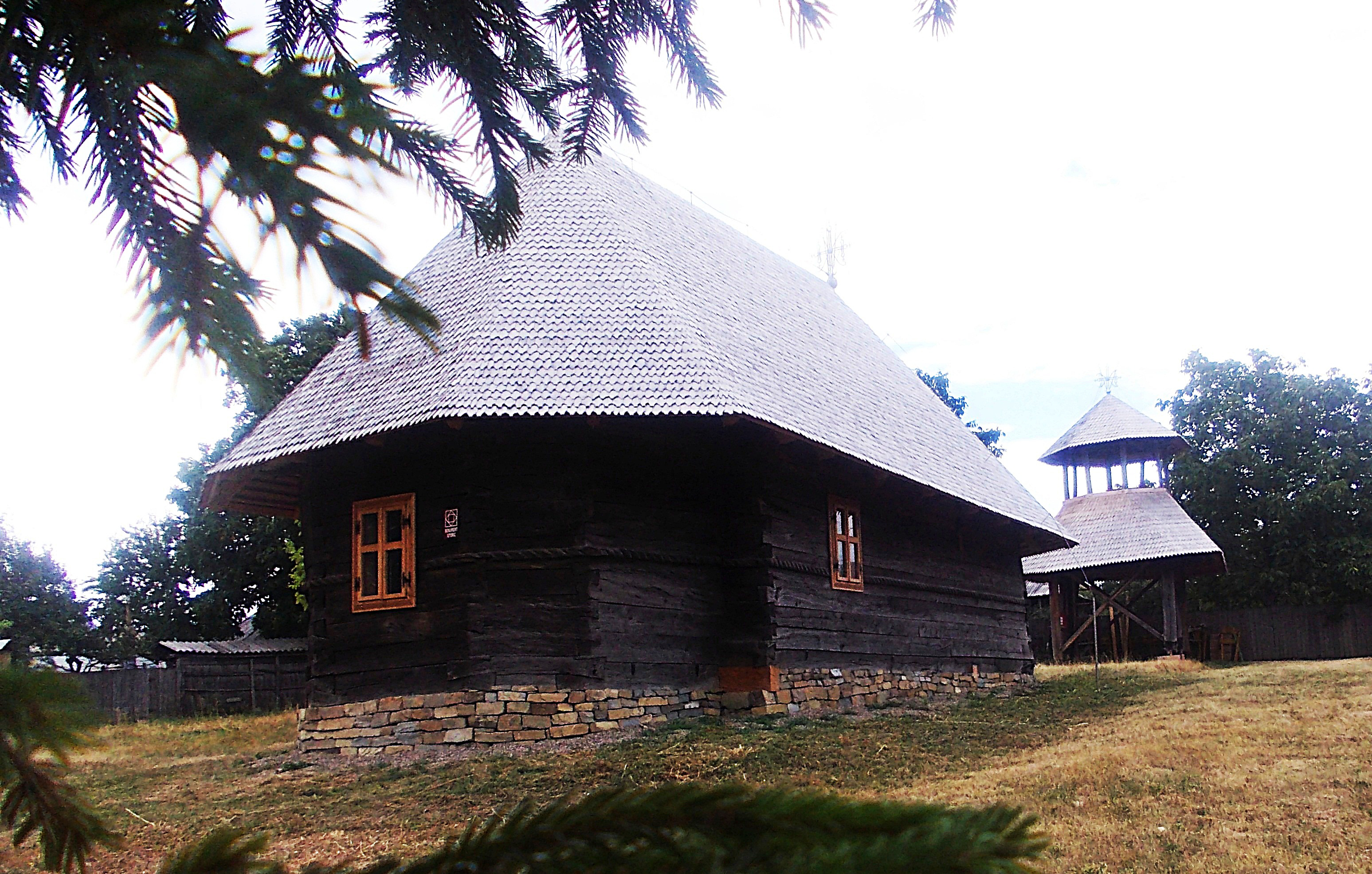
- Wooden church in Chițcani

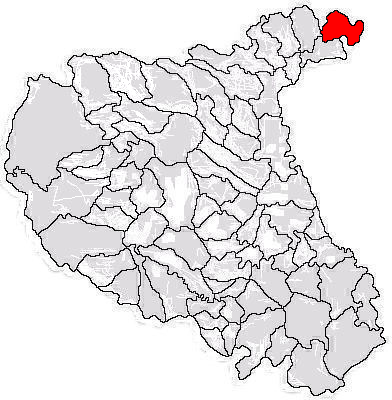
- Location in Vrancea County

- Location in Romania
- Coordinates: 46°10′N 27°24′E
- Country: Romania
- County: Vrancea

Government
  - Mayor (2024–2028): Ionuț-Daniel Spulber (PSD)
- Area: 50.25 km^{2} (19.40 sq mi)
- Elevation: 243 m (797 ft)
- Population (2021-12-01): 1,264
  - Density: 25.15/km^{2} (65.15/sq mi)
- Time zone: UTC+02:00 (EET)
  - Summer (DST): UTC+03:00 (EEST)
- Postal code: 627455
- Area code: +(40) 237
- Vehicle reg.: VN
- Website: www.primaria-boghesti.ro

Boghești is a commune located in Vrancea County, Romania. It is composed of nine villages: Boghești, Bogheștii de Sus, Bichești, Chițcani, Iugani, Plăcințeni, Pleșești, Prisecani, and Tăbucești.

Historical population
Year	Pop.	±%
2002	1,835	—
2011	1,680	−8.4%
2021	1,264	−24.8%
Source: Census data
