= Corbu, Harghita =

Corbu Gyergyóholló
- Commune
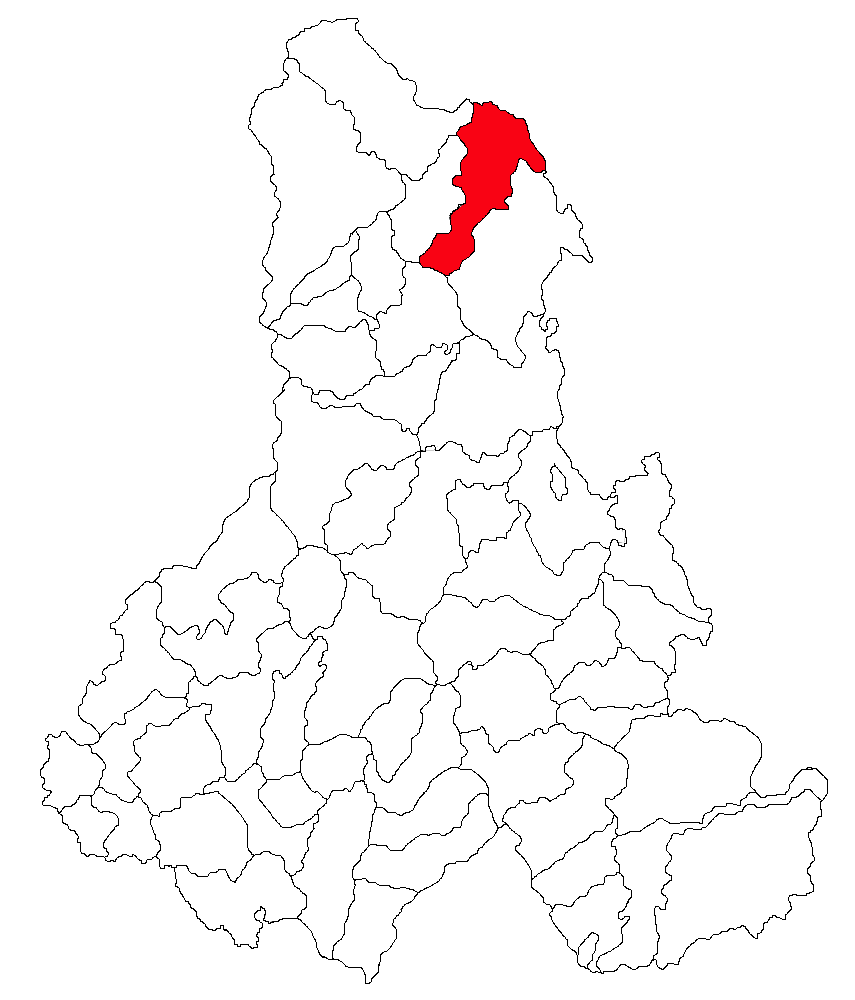
- Location in Harghita County

- Location in Romania
- Coordinates: 46°59′N 25°42′E
- Country: Romania
- County: Harghita

Government
  - Mayor (2020–2024): Romeo Țepeș-Focșa (PSD)
- Area: 140.49 km^{2} (54.24 sq mi)
- Elevation: 693 m (2,274 ft)
- Population (2021-12-01): 1,282
  - Density: 9.1/km^{2} (24/sq mi)
- Time zone: EET/EEST (UTC+2/+3)
- Postal code: 537055
- Area code: +40 x66
- Vehicle reg.: HR
- Website: www.primariacorbuhr.ro

Corbu (Hungarian: Gyergyóholló, Hungarian pronunciation: [ɟɛrɡioːholloː]) is a commune in Harghita County, Transylvania, Romania. The commune is composed of two villages, Capu Corbului (Hollósarka) and Corbu.

The commune is located in the northern part of the county, on the border with Neamț County. Corbu lies at an altitude of about 693 m (2,274 ft), nestled between the Bistrița Mountains and the Giurgeu Mountains. The Bistricioara River and its right tributaries, Pârâul Vinului and Corbu, flow through the commune.

The nearest town is Borsec, 14 km (8.7 mi) to the west; the county seat, Miercurea Ciuc, is 128 km (80 mi) to the south. Corbu is crossed by national road DN15, which links Transylvania to Western Moldavia.

At the 2011 census, the commune had a population of 1,520; out of them, 84% were Romanian, 9% were Hungarian, and 5% were Roma.
