= Pipirig =

- Commune
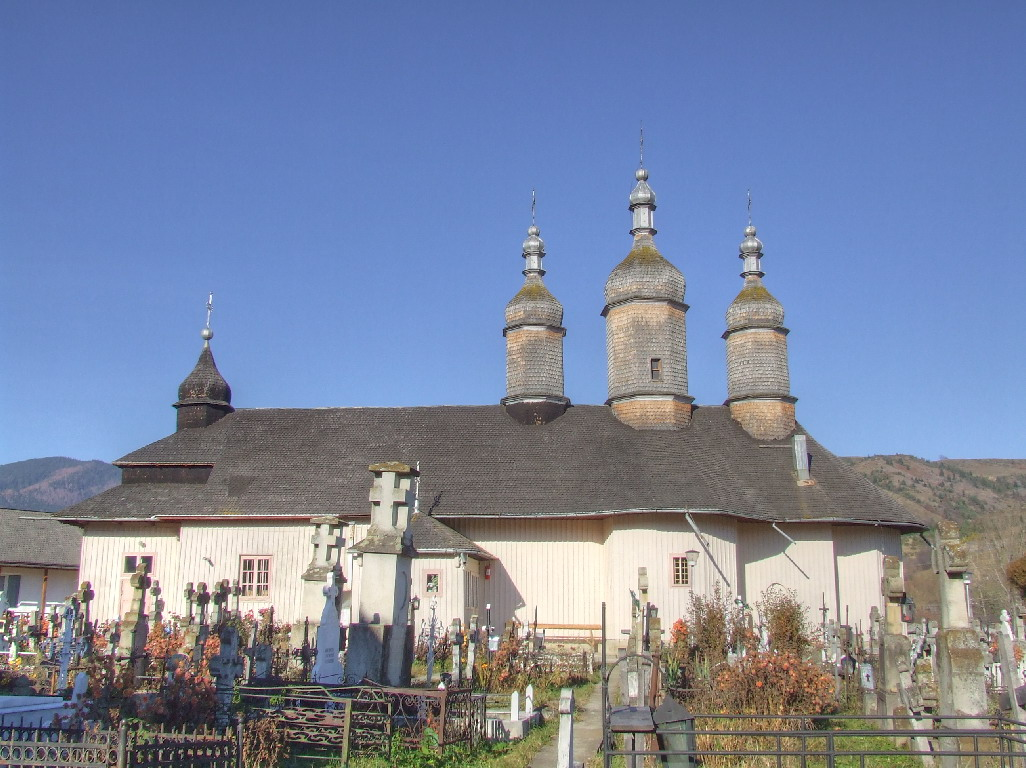
- Saint Nicholas Church in Pipirig village

- Location in Neamț County

- Location in Romania
- Coordinates: 47°15′N 26°4′E
- Country: Romania
- County: Neamț

Government
  - Mayor (2024–2028): Vasile Dorneanu (PSD)
- Area: 196.81 km^{2} (75.99 sq mi)
- Elevation: 608 m (1,995 ft)
- Population (2021-12-01): 8,352
  - Density: 42.44/km^{2} (109.9/sq mi)
- Time zone: UTC+02:00 (EET)
  - Summer (DST): UTC+03:00 (EEST)
- Postal code: 617325
- Area code: (+40) x33
- Vehicle reg.: NT
- Website: www.pipirig.ro

Pipirig (Romanian pronunciation: [pipiˈrig]) is a commune in Neamț County, Western Moldavia, Romania. It is composed of seven villages: Boboiești, Dolhești, Leghin, Pâțâligeni, Pipirig, Pluton, and Stânca.

Historical population
Year	Pop.	±%
1992	8,440	—
2002	8,627	+2.2%
2011	8,372	−3.0%
2021	8,352	−0.2%
Source: Census data

== Natives ==
- Nicodim, born Nicolae Munteanu (1864–1948), Patriarch of All Romania.
