= Corbu, Olt =

Corbu
- Commune
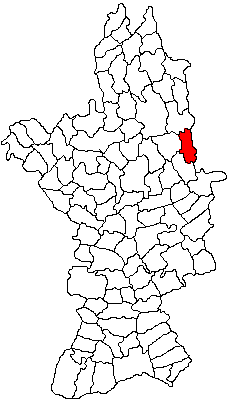
- Location in Olt County

- Location in Romania
- Coordinates: 44°30′N 24°43′E
- Country: Romania
- County: Olt
- Population (2021-12-01): 2,118
- Time zone: EET/EEST (UTC+2/+3)
- Vehicle reg.: OT

Corbu is a commune in Olt County, Muntenia, Romania. It is composed of five villages: Burdulești, Buzești, Ciurești, Corbu and Milcoveni.

In 2011, the population of Corbu commune was 2,458 inhabitants. 83.93% of the inhabitants are Romanians, and 12.94% of population belongs to Roma. The majority of inhabitants are Orthodox (96.75%).
