= Corb =

Corb or CORB may refer to:

Figures in Irish mythology and legendary history:

- Corb (mythology), a Fomorian
- Mug Corb, sometimes called Mac Corb, a High King
- Fer Corb, a High King, son of Mug Corb

Others:

- Corb (river), a river in Catalonia, Spain
- Children's Overseas Reception Board (CORB), a British child-welfare organisation active in 1940
- Corb Lund and the Hurtin' Albertans, a Canadian country music band, formerly known as the Corb Lund Band
- Morty Corb (1917–1996), an American jazz double-bassist
- Le Corbusier (1887-1965), Swiss-French architect
