= Târgu Neamț =

Town in Western Moldavia, Romania

- Town
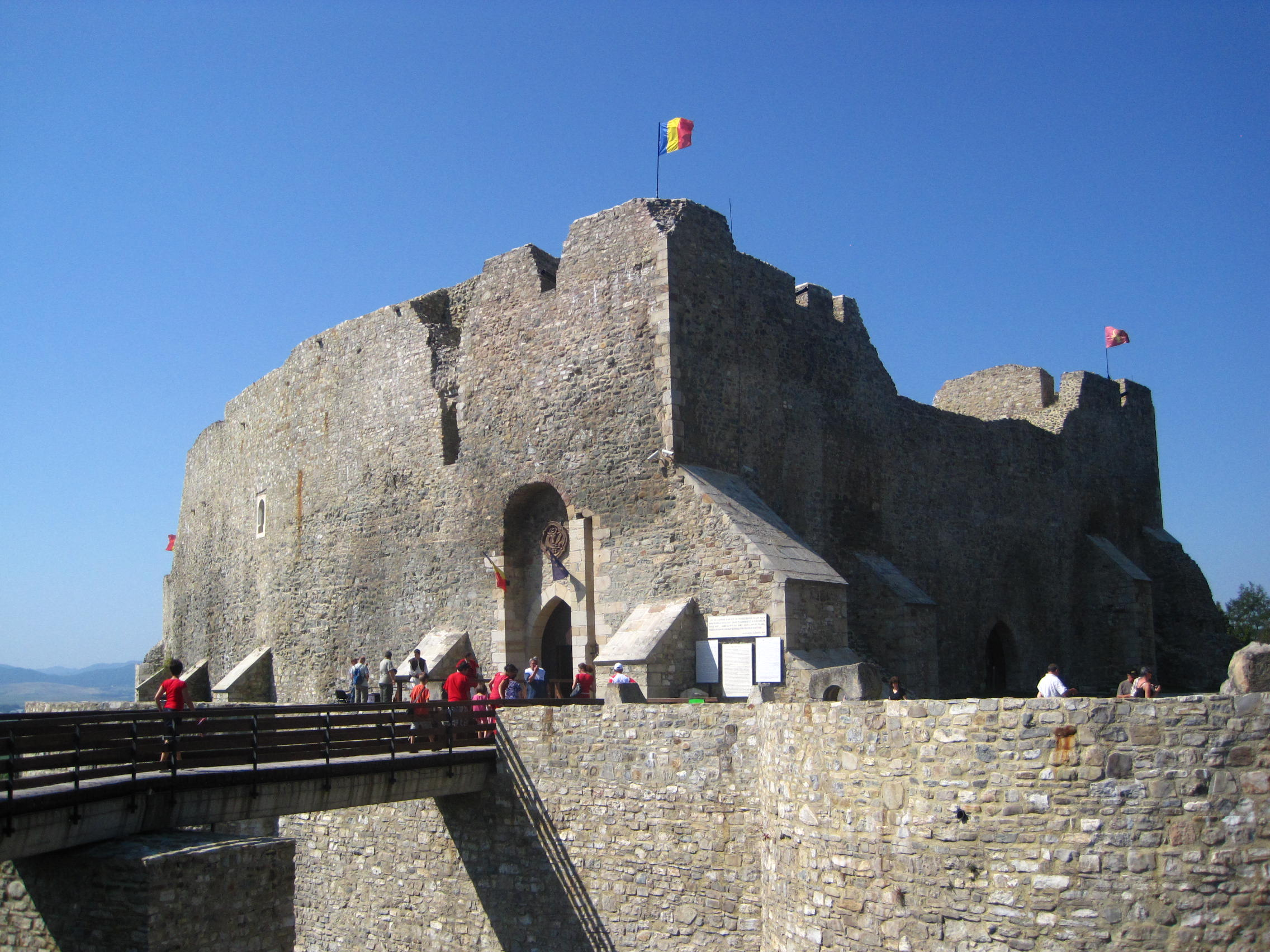
- Neamț Citadel

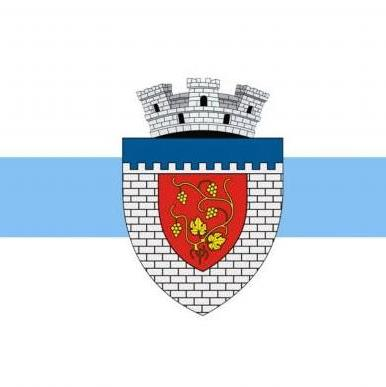
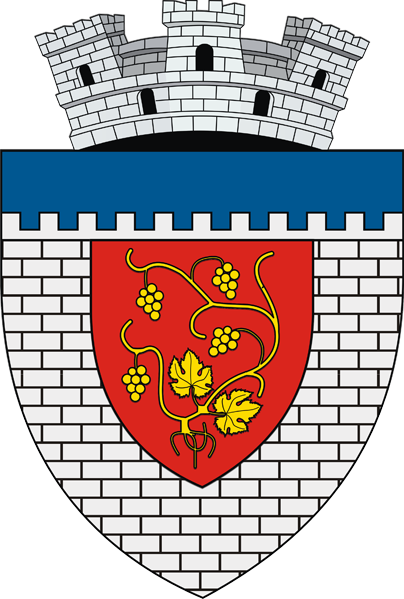
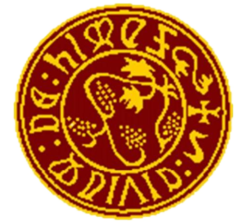
- Flag Coat of arms Seal

- Location in Neamț County

- Location in Romania
- Coordinates: 47°12′9″N 26°21′31″E
- Country: Romania
- County: Neamț

Government
  - Mayor (2024–2028): Vasile Apopei (PSD)
- Area: 47.31 km^{2} (18.27 sq mi)
- Elevation: 365 m (1,198 ft)
- Population (2021-12-01): 18,029
  - Density: 381.1/km^{2} (987.0/sq mi)
- Time zone: UTC+02:00 (EET)
  - Summer (DST): UTC+03:00 (EEST)
- Postal code: 615200
- Area code: (+40) 02 33
- Vehicle reg.: NT
- Website: www.primariatgneamt.ro

Târgu Neamț (Romanian pronunciation: [ˌtɨrɡu ˈne̯amt͡s]; German: Niamtz, Hungarian: Németvásár, Hebrew: טרגו ניאמץ, Latin: Ante Castrum Nempch) is a town in Neamț County, Western Moldavia, Romania, on the river Neamț. It had, as of 2021, a population of 18,029. Three villages are administered by the town: Blebea, Humulești, and Humuleștii Noi.

== History ==
Originally a market town, hence its name (in Romanian "târg" = market), it had an important role in Moldavian culture. It was first mentioned in a late-14th century document.

The name neamț is a generic name of Slavic origin for the German people in the Romanian language. This has led to speculation of a German foundation of Târgu Neamț, according to which Saxon colonists crossed the Carpathians from the Bistrița area and built a commercial township. Some Romanian historians, including Bogdan Petriceicu Hasdeu consider that Târgu Neamț was probably a German settlement from the 13th century, when the Teutonic Order made incursions from Transylvania against the Cumanic peoples that were living in Moldavia.

== Access ==
The town is located at the crossing of two national roads: DN15B and DN15C. The planned East-West Motorway will bypass the town on its south when completed, providing access to Iași (to the east) and Târgu Mureș to the west. The railroad station is the terminus station of CFR Line 517 linking it to Pașcani via an electrified railway.

== Tourism and attractions ==
- The Neamț Fortress (Cetatea Neamțului) was built in the 14th century by Voivode Petru I (possibly on the ruins of a smaller Teutonic castle), and is located on the north bank of the Neamț River.
- Târgu Neamț is an appropriate starting point for trips to the monasteries in the region, located all on an average 15 km (9.3 mi) radius: Neamț Monastery, Secu Monastery, Agapia Monastery, Văratec Monastery, Sihăstria Monastery, and Sihla Skete. It is close to the Ceahlău Massif, Durău, and the Bistrița Valley.
- Ion Creangă memorial house in Humulești, across the Ozana river: This is the house where the famous Romanian writer was born and where he spent his childhood. The stories from Ion Creangă's masterpiece, Amintiri din copilărie ("Memories of my childhood"), revolve around Humulești, Târgu Neamț, and the surrounding villages.
- Monumentul Eroilor (Heroes' Monument): an obelisk that commemorates the Romanian soldiers who fought in World War I is found on Pleșu Hill, near the Pometea suburb. It commands views of the town and the surrounding mountains.
- The Vânători-Neamț Natural Park, housing a herd of wisent, the European bisons that once roamed the Eastern Carpathians.
- The Nicolae Popa ethnographic museum în Târpești.

== Climate ==
Târgu Neamț has a warm-summer humid continental climate (Köppen: Dfb), being located in the Neamț Depression. It is a basin enclosed by the Carpathian Mountains to the west and by the Subcarpathian hills and ridges to the north and east. These surrounding landforms act as natural barriers to subpolar and continental air masses, creating a sheltered local climate.

Situated at 47°12′ N latitude, Târgu Neamț receives moderate levels of solar radiation throughout the year. This is further enhanced by the predominantly southeast-facing slopes. The area's atmospheric circulation is mainly influenced by maritime air masses arriving from the west and northwest. After crossing the Carpathian Mountains, these air masses become more continental in character and lose part of their moisture. Continental air masses from the east and northeast are also common, bringing cold winters and hot, dry summers. The region is periodically affected by outbreaks of subpolar air from the north, as well as cold air associated with cyclones moving eastward from Western Europe. However, the town's sheltered location reduces the impact of these extreme weather conditions.

The mean annual air temperature is 8.2 °C (46.8 °F). January is the coldest month, with an average temperature of −3.8 °C (25.2 °F), while July is the warmest, averaging 19.5 °C (67.1 °F). The mean annual temperature range is 23.3 °C (41.9 °F), reflecting the area's moderate humid continental climate. The lowest temperature ever recorded in Târgu Neamț was −29.1 °C (−20.4 °F) on 2 January 1909, while the highest was 39.0 °C (98.6 °F) on 15 August 1957.

Climate data for Târgu Neamț (elevation 387m, 2014–2026 normals, extremes 1909–present)
Month	Jan	Feb	Mar	Apr	May	Jun	Jul	Aug	Sep	Oct	Nov	Dec	Year
Record high °C (°F)	19.7 (67.5)	20.9 (69.6)	27.5 (81.5)	30.0 (86.0)	33.1 (91.6)	35.2 (95.4)	37.9 (100.2)	39.0 (102.2)	35.9 (96.6)	30.0 (86.0)	25.0 (77.0)	20.3 (68.5)	39.0 (102.2)
Mean maximum °C (°F)	13.4 (56.1)	14.8 (58.6)	20.8 (69.4)	24.4 (75.9)	27.7 (81.9)	32.1 (89.8)	33.1 (91.6)	33.8 (92.8)	30.2 (86.4)	24.7 (76.5)	19.7 (67.5)	14.7 (58.5)	34.5 (94.1)
Mean daily maximum °C (°F)	3.6 (38.5)	5.3 (41.5)	10.2 (50.4)	15.5 (59.9)	20.3 (68.5)	25.4 (77.7)	27.0 (80.6)	27.8 (82.0)	22.6 (72.7)	15.7 (60.3)	8.8 (47.8)	5.3 (41.5)	15.6 (60.1)
Daily mean °C (°F)	−0.3 (31.5)	1.3 (34.3)	5.4 (41.7)	10.1 (50.2)	14.8 (58.6)	19.9 (67.8)	21.2 (70.2)	21.4 (70.5)	16.8 (62.2)	10.6 (51.1)	5.1 (41.2)	1.9 (35.4)	10.7 (51.2)
Mean daily minimum °C (°F)	−4.1 (24.6)	−2.7 (27.1)	0.7 (33.3)	4.7 (40.5)	9.3 (48.7)	14.3 (57.7)	15.5 (59.9)	15.1 (59.2)	11.1 (52.0)	5.5 (41.9)	1.4 (34.5)	−1.6 (29.1)	5.8 (42.4)
Mean minimum °C (°F)	−14.6 (5.7)	−10.8 (12.6)	−6.8 (19.8)	−2.6 (27.3)	2.5 (36.5)	8.6 (47.5)	10.5 (50.9)	9.9 (49.8)	3.8 (38.8)	−0.9 (30.4)	−5.4 (22.3)	−9.6 (14.7)	−15.7 (3.7)
Record low °C (°F)	−29.1 (−20.4)	−23.6 (−10.5)	−19.5 (−3.1)	−7.5 (18.5)	−3.5 (25.7)	3.2 (37.8)	5.0 (41.0)	4.5 (40.1)	−3.6 (25.5)	−8.7 (16.3)	−17.7 (0.1)	−24.9 (−12.8)	−29.1 (−20.4)
Average precipitation mm (inches)	19.5 (0.77)	21.9 (0.86)	37.1 (1.46)	45.0 (1.77)	86.9 (3.42)	102.9 (4.05)	86.2 (3.39)	40.5 (1.59)	52.6 (2.07)	59.7 (2.35)	31.0 (1.22)	25.6 (1.01)	608.9 (23.96)
Average precipitation days (≥ 1.0 mm)	5.2	5.2	6.3	7.7	9.8	10.1	9.6	5.4	5.9	6.8	5.2	5.8	83
Average snowy days	7.0	6.3	3.3	1.5	0	0	0	0	0	0.4	2.4	6.2	27.1
Source 1: Meteomanz
Source 2: mmediu.gov.ro

== Natives ==
- Dumitru Botez
- Constantin Cojocariu
- Ana Conta-Kernbach
- Daniel Corbu
- Dumitru A. Cornelson
- Ion Creangă
- Constantin Crișan
- Ștefan Dănilă
- Emanoil Dumitrescu
- Florin Gheorghiță
- Moshe Idel
- Irving Layton
- Gabriela Mihalschi
- Mariana Simionescu
- Valentin Ursache
- Ioan Vieru

Historical population
Year	Pop.	±%
1912	9,095	—
1930	9,475	+4.2%
1948	8,948	−5.6%
1956	10,373	+15.9%
1966	12,877	+24.1%
1977	14,951	+16.1%
1992	22,282	+49.0%
2002	22,634	+1.6%
2011	18,232	−19.4%
2021	18,029	−1.1%
Source: Census data

== Gallery ==
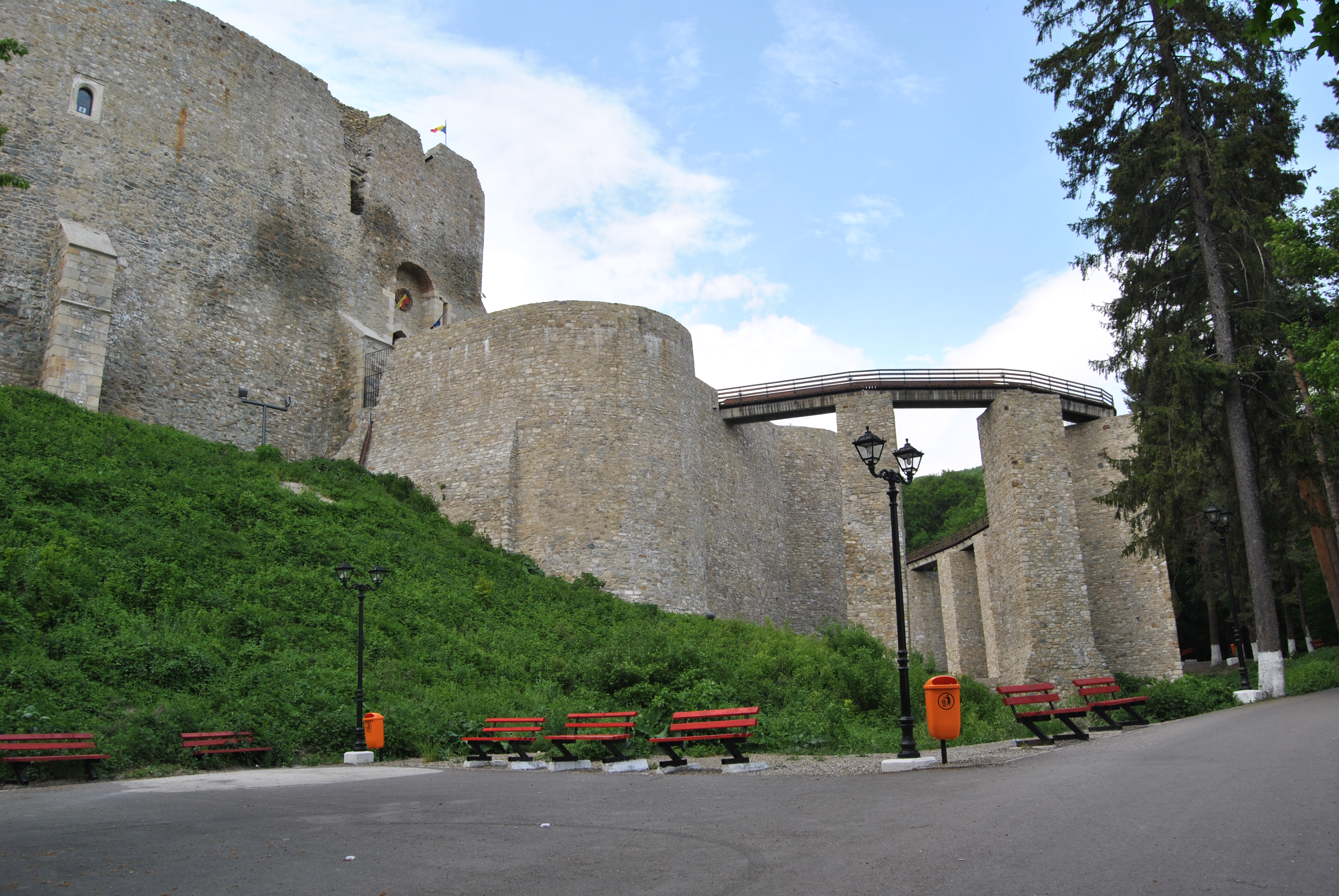
Neamț Citadel, located on Pleșu Hill

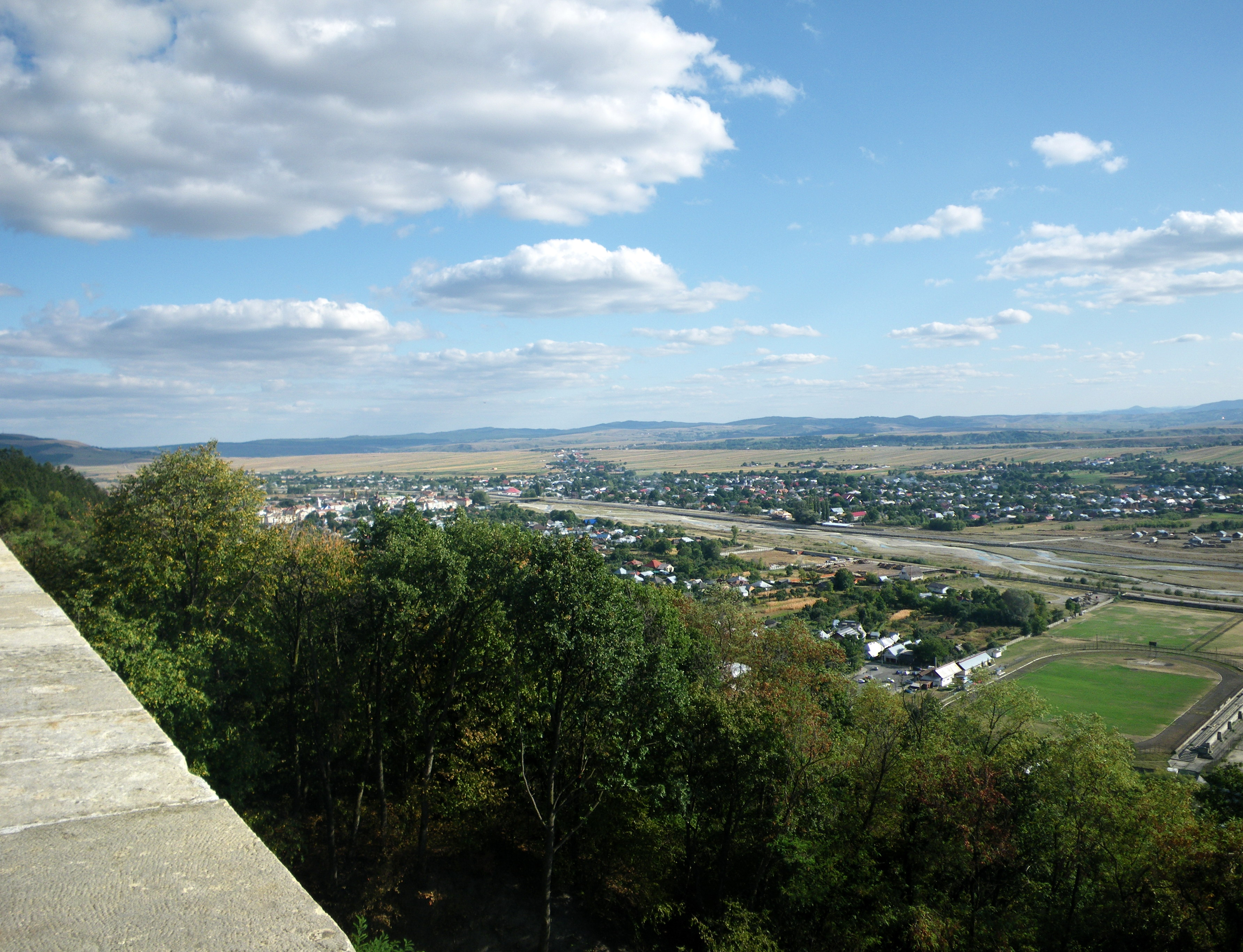
View from Citadel

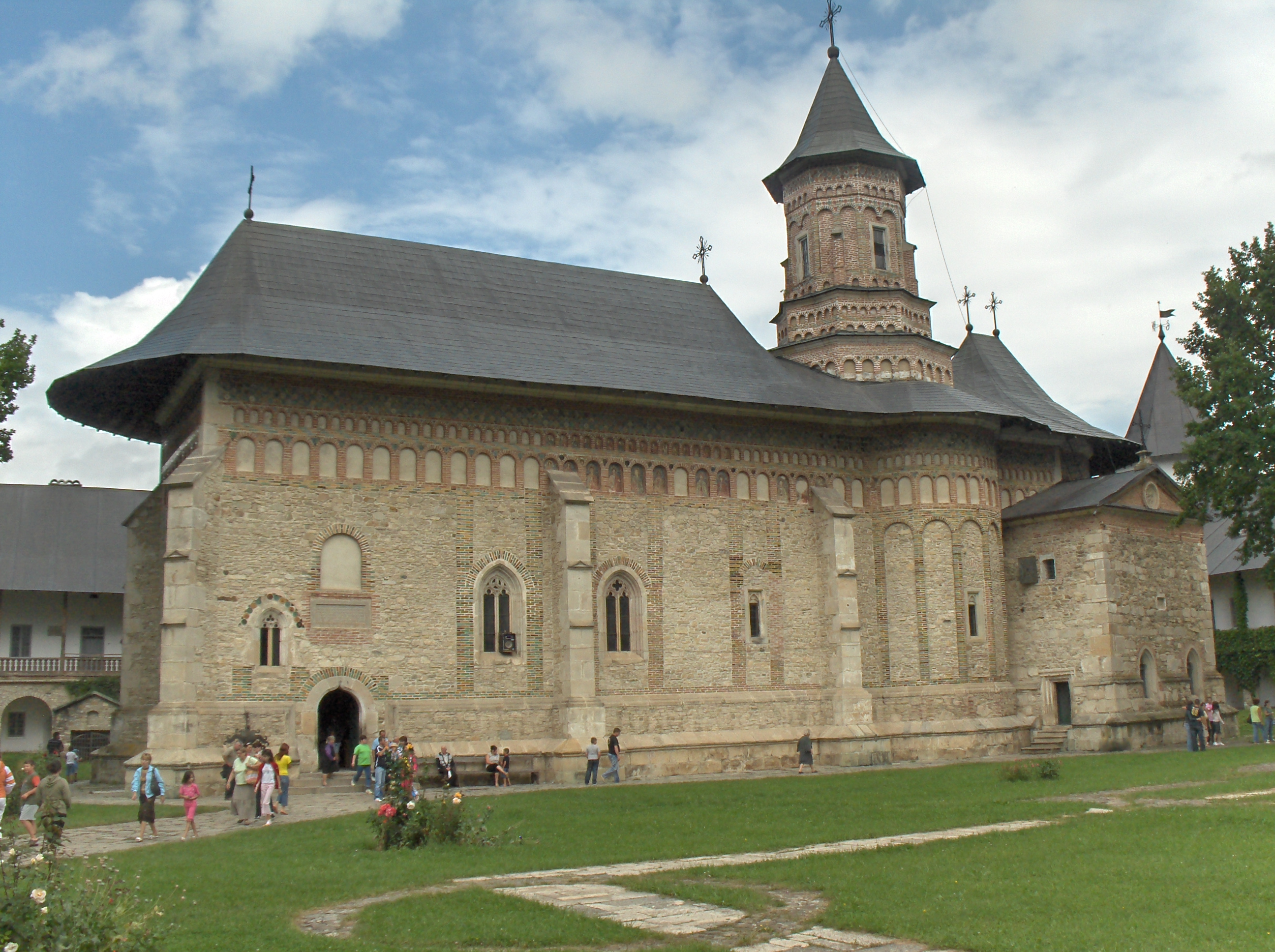
Neamț Monastery, located 10 km west of Târgu Neamț

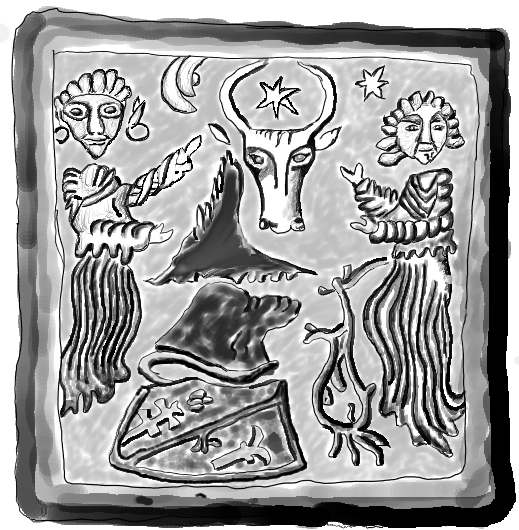
Image discovered from the stove's remains in Neamț Fortress, showing Zubr/Aurochs the coat of arms of Moldova

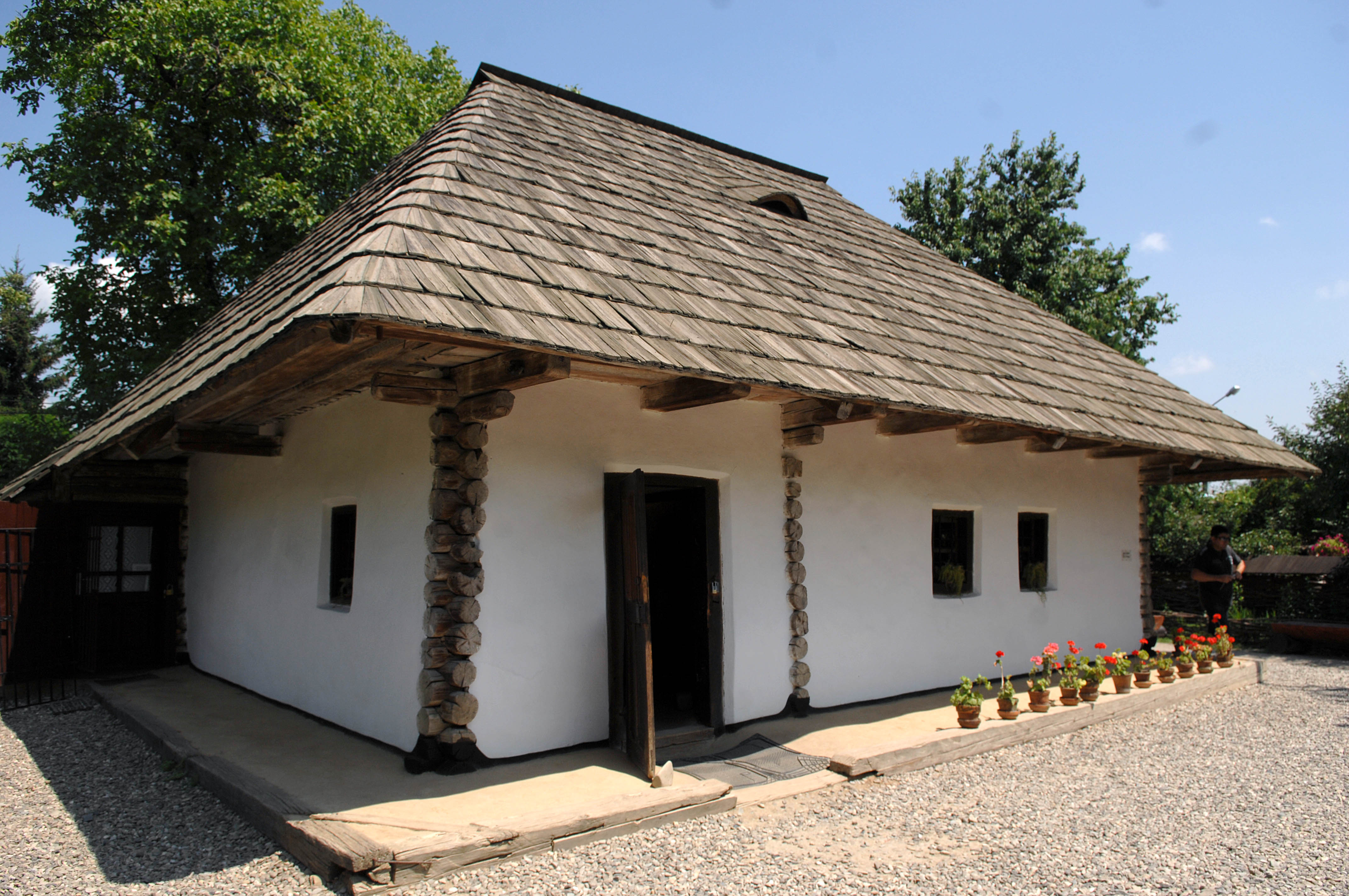
Ion Creangă House in Humulești
