= Profira Sadoveanu =

Romanian prose writer and poet (1906–2003)

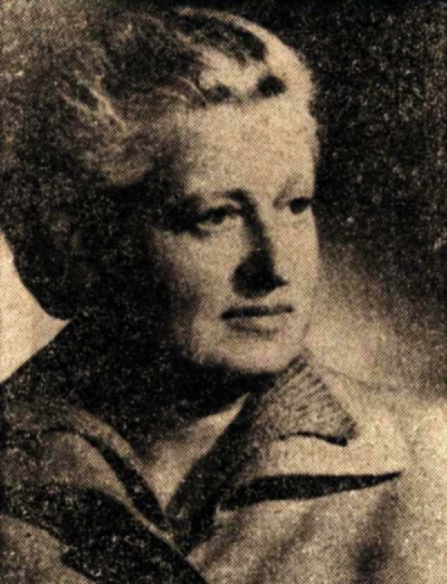
- Sadoveanu in 1977
- Born: 22 May 1906; Fălticeni, Kingdom of Romania
- Died: 3 October 2003 (aged 97); Bucharest, Romania
- Occupations: Journalist; editor; translator; literary secretary; dramaturge
- Relatives: Mihail Sadoveanu (father); Paul-Mihu Sadoveanu (brother)
- Writing career
- Pen name: Valer Donea, Mariana Val
- Period: c. 1920–1990
- Genres: Reportage; memoir; essay; biography; adventure novel; lyric poetry; sonnet; prose poem; pastiche; children's poetry; musical comedy; closet drama; children's theater; screenplay; teleplay
- Literary movement: Poporanism; Viața Romînească; Socialist Realism

Profira Sadoveanu (pen name Valer Donea; 21 May 1906 – 3 October 2003), also credited as Profirița and known after her marriage as Sadoveanu Popa, was a Romanian prose writer and poet, noted as the daughter, literary secretary, and editor of the celebrated novelist Mihail Sadoveanu. She was born during her father's stay in Fălticeni, on the traditional border between Western Moldavia and Bukovina, and is sometimes regarding as belonging to a Bukovinan literary tradition. She had fond memories of the place, where she had a carefree childhood on her paternal estate. During the campaigns of World War I, the family relocated to the urban center of Iași, purchasing a villa on Copou Hill. Profira's adolescence saw her socializing with some major figures in Romanian literature, who were friends of her father. Her own debut as a poet, in the 1920s, was overseen by George Topîrceanu.

In the early 1930s, Sadoveanu was an aspiring playwright and thespian, working with Ion Sava and Costache Popa on the production of independent plays, and contributing a musical comedy of her own. Popa, also active as a translator and interior designer, became her husband for the next four decades, and moved with her to Bucharest. Profira's choice for a career in theater was actively discouraged by her father, who was instead fully supportive of her becoming a writing professional; he personally handled the manuscript of her first novel, in 1933, and had her publish reportage works in his Adevărul. This second debut earned her critical attention, though her later efforts in the field were touched by allegations of immorality and plagiarism from Sadoveanu Sr. She spent much of World War II editing his works for print in a luxury edition—a project interrupted briefly by the fascist National Legionary State, during which the Sadoveanus and Popas went into hiding, fearing for their lives. Her attempt to return as a poet, in 1944, saw her most copies of her new book being destroyed by American bombers. During the final stages of the war, she also arranged for print a novel written by her brother Paul-Mihu, who had been killed in action at Turda.

The Romanian communist regime, inaugurated in 1948, openly celebrated Sadoveanu Sr, including by selecting him as republican head of state. At this stage, Profira, like Mihail and her stepmother Valeria, converted her style to Socialist Realism, contributing the screenplay to a 1952 film, Mitrea Cocor. Regarded as a leading authority on her father, whose secretary she had been for decades, she was allowed to continue with editing a definitive edition of his works, as well as numerous lifetime and posthumous biographies of him, and memoirs of her own childhood. She alternated these with a number of prose poems, which represent adaptations of his narrative style in verse form; with Mircea Drăgan and Alexandru Mitru, she also adapted his Frații Jderi into a 1974 film. In parallel, Sadoveanu Jr had a steady output as a translator of Russian-, French- and English-language works, introducing the Romanian public to the novels of Peter Neagoe and William Saroyan.

== Childhood ==
Born in Fălticeni, Profira was the favorite child of novelist-politician Mihail Sadoveanu and his wife Ecaterina née Bâlu. Her exact birthplace at No 40 Rădășani Street was part of the Bâlus' dowry. According to her daughter's testimony, Ecaterina had been an aspiring writer, before marrying and dedicating herself to homemaking. Profira had an older sister, Despina; her other siblings were Teodora "Didica", famed for her beauty, painter Dimitrie Sadoveanu, and the youngest boy, novelist Paul-Mihu Sadoveanu; another brother, Bogdan, died in 1920, at the age of seven. According to a memoir published in the 1980s, her father and mother (whom she called Catincuța) raised her an atheist, though she was never able to suppress her belief in angels. She attended the "girls' school" on Fălticeni's Rădăștenilor Street, then the local Nicu Gane High School (from 1917 to 1918). Some of her earliest memories include seeing her father dressed up in an officer's uniform in preparation for the Second Balkan War.

Shortly after her birth, the family bought a vacant plot from the local pharmacist Vorel (known to Profira as a "German apothecary"), which Mihail turned into an orchard. He also personally designed Profira's childhood home, which included odaia națională ("the room of the nation"), with portraits of historical figures such as Stephen the Great, Michael the Brave, Vasile Lupu, and Alexandru Ioan Cuza. At this second address, she was neighbors with the destitute writer I. Dragoslav. She was additionally schoolmates and best friends with the future mathematician Florica T. Câmpan, who recalls that she had pity for Profira, assuming that Mihail, as a professional writer, must have also been miserably poor. In contrast, Profira viewed her child self as "the happiest being in existence", since she was "free to roam wherever I wished", and could walk everywhere barefoot. Her father introduced her to the staples of Romanian literature, allowing her to memorize large portions of Mihai Eminescu's poetry and of Vasile Alecsandri's drama ("my first love"); she was also an enthusiastic reader of Nikolai Gogol, trying out home-theater adaptations of Gogol's Marriage and "May Night". She followed up with compositions presented in school, and recalled being frustrated by suspicions that Mihail was writing these on her behalf.

Profira's life was interrupted abruptly during the Romanian campaigns of World War I; she later confessed to her fear and indignation that Mihail was once forced to present himself for active duty. Her education was continued with a private course prepared by her father, after which she attended Oltea Doamna High School in Iași, graduating in 1925. The entire family had relocated to that city, a regional capital of Western Moldavia, and occupied a villa on Copou Hill—the building had once been owned by politician Mihail Kogălniceanu. In 1920 or '21, she produced a handwritten single-issue magazine, Flori de Câmp ("Flowers of the Field"), with contributions by Didica and illustrations by her brother Dumitru. It featured her first-ever poem. Sadoveanu Sr discreetly read the piece, and then asked a poet friend, George Topîrceanu, to weigh in. Throughout her life, Profira kept and strictly followed the guidelines she received then from Topîrceanu. Mingling in with the literary circle formed around Viața Romînească, she was present when the family entertained there some of the major figures in interwar Romanian literature, and later also witnessed impromptu performances by singer Maria Tănase. Her writings, some of which contain minute records of her life with Sadoveanu Sr, report that she and her siblings often assisted her father with proofreading; she had by then "devour[ed] our huge parental library". Sadoveanu Jr took pride in noting that she was the only one of her siblings whom Mihail consulted, when writing his novels.

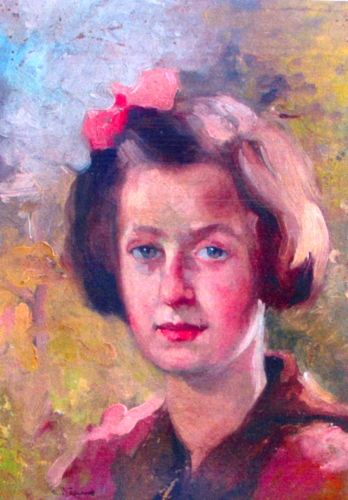
Oil portrait of a young Profira Sadoveanu, by Aurel Băeșu

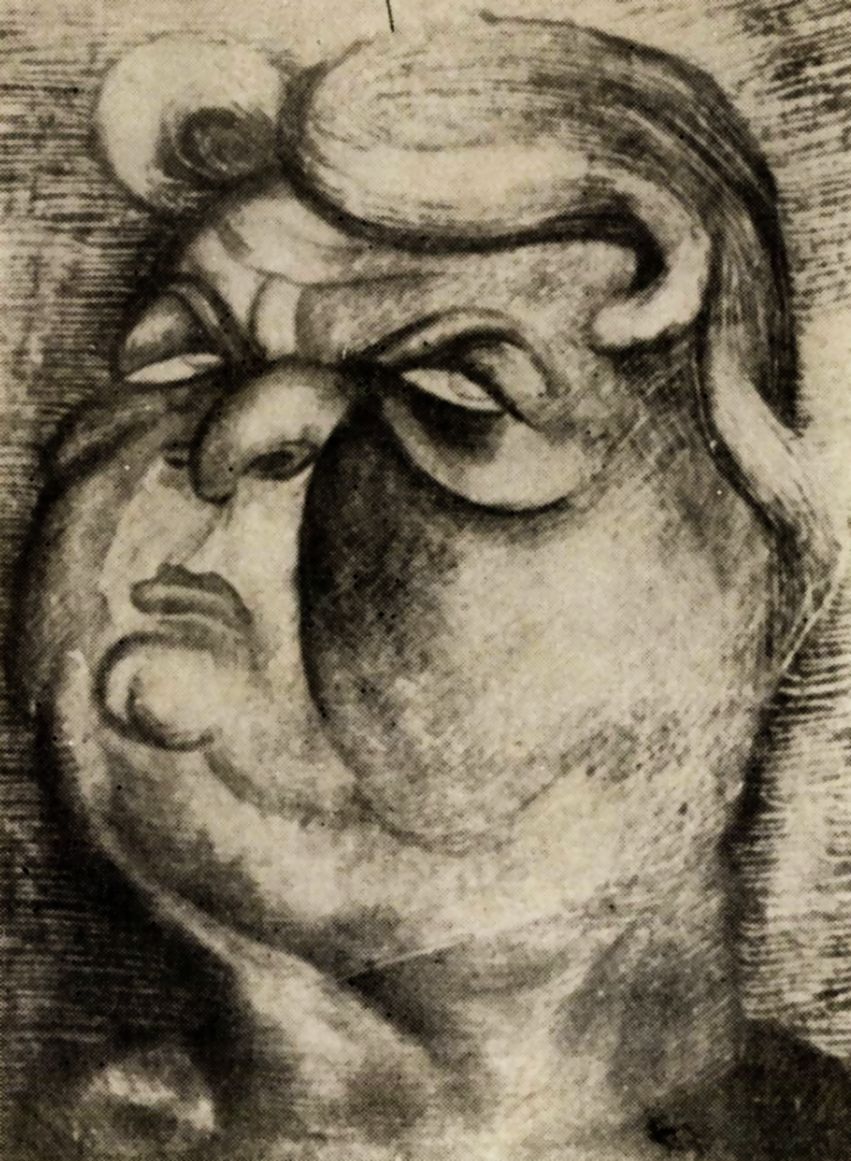
Caricature of Mihail Sadoveanu, by Profira's friend Ion Sava

Profira studied at the philosophy section of the literature and philosophy faculty at Iași University from in the 1920s (sources diverge, placing the range between 1923 and 1929). With her colleague and friend Valeria Mitru, she spent the period between December 1923 and May 1924 in Czechoslovakia. She never took her graduating examination. Her scholarly activities included sociological fieldwork with Petre Andrei, who, in 1927, took her back to Fălticeni, allowing her to see her childhood home after a nine-year absence.

== Debut years ==
In 1928, Sadoveanu Sr selected one of Profira's stories, Săniușul ("Sledging"), for publication in Mihail Sevastos' literary newspaper Adevărul Literar și Artistic. In 1929, Sevastos also selected for print a reportage of her student trip to Bratislava. In 1930, father and daughter journeyed together throughout the northern reaches of Western Moldavia and Bukovina, witnessing first-hand the on-site development of his masterpiece, The Hatchet. Sadoveanu Jr was encouraged to write by her father's colleagues, including Dimitrie D. Pătrășcanu, who rated one of her prose fragments as the seed of a potentially "colossal book". Under the pen name "Valer Donea" (which originated with a private "joke"), she published more reportage works in Universul Literar.

Profira's first published translation, in 1930, was Alfred de Musset's novel, White Blackbird; in 1931, she and Teodora completed similar work on Roland Dorgelès' Partir.... The young woman also intended to study the dramatic arts in Paris, but did not obtain Mihail's consent. During the early 1930s, she was involved with the underground art scene of Iași, helping Costache Popa and Expressionist painter Ion Sava with Teatrul de vedenii ("The Theater of Apparitions"); she had contributions on adapting stories from Rudyard Kipling ("The Mark of the Beast"), Edgar Allan Poe ("The System of Doctor Tarr and Professor Fether"), and E. T. A. Hoffmann ("The Choosing of a Bride").

"Around 1933", Profira had written her own musical comedy, Visuri americane ("American Dreams"), and managed to have it shown at the National Theater Iași in May 1935; Sava was the director, and Alexandru Celibidache the musical producer. The plot moved between Iași and America's major film studios, with local actors impersonating 1930s movie stars—from Greta Garbo to Adolphe Menjou and Charlie Chaplin. She intended to play the female lead, but her father made her promise to step down—her part went to Eliza Petrăchescu, in her first stage performance. The original cast also included Ștefan Ciubotărașu and, on his only performance as an actor, the future conductor Sergiu Celibidache.

Still hoping to open up her own theater in collaboration with Sava and Clody Bertola, Profira focused part of her literary work on closet drama, noting in 1977 that she still found this to be a very pleasurable aspect of her career. By 1935, she had married Popa, whose main career was as a translator of English literature. Her first published volume was 1933's Mormolocul ("Tadpole"), introduced as a novel. Its publication was again mediated by her influential father, who personally recommended it, and even carried it with him, for publication at Cartea Românească. As observed by biographer Ionel Oprișan, Sadoveanu Sr dominates the narrative itself, being present there "almost as a divinity." Literary scholar Bianca Burța-Cernat places the book within the larger traditionalist ideology of Poporanism, which had emerged around Viața Romînească. As Burța-Cernat notes, Sadoveanu and Ștefana Velisar Teodoreanu were mainly Poporanists through their family and background, rather than explicit affiliation; overall, she rates Mormolocul as a "beautiful book". According to critic Constantin Gerota, the novel stood out as a worthy effort, and a sample of adolescent literature better than those by Marta Rădulescu, but was in fact a memoir. Poet and columnist Alexandru Robot remarked it as a "descriptive and elementary book, with no emotional states to speak of."

== Breakthrough ==
Burța-Cernat suggests that Sadoveanu and her colleague Otilia Cazimir represented a slightly more rebellious weave in interwar women's literature, which displayed their support for feminism. However, she cautions, "the 'feminist' subversiveness of their prose is extremely low-key", and their association with Viața Romînească meant subservience to a "patriarchal climate". Profira's success was acknowledged by Sadoveanu Sr, who in November 1933 dedicated her one of his own novels as "for my colleague Profira Sadoveanu". As she herself recalled, she was shortlisted for the Femina Prize for women's literature, but snubbed by her own Poporanist aunt, Izabela Sadoveanu-Evan, who asked the jury to vote instead for the aged Elena Farago. Profira also had two other short novels on hand. One of them, Pielea de șarpe ("The Snake Skin"), was rejected by Cartea Românească, who found its subject matter to be "immoral" (this also discouraged her from presenting its sequel, Volley Ball).

Sadoveanu Jr only returned to the genre in 1937, with Naufragiații din Aukland ("Shipwrecks of Aukland [sic]"). This adventure novel, set in the eponymous archipelago, is read by Burța-Cernat as anticipating the more successful Toate pînzele sus!, by Radu Tudoran, and also a "pale imitation" of classics such as The Mysterious Island. It was marginally inspired by the elder Sadoveanu: very interested in Australian topics, he had selected the story from articles in Le Tour du Monde; since he also made small contributions in exotic nature writing, Profira was accused of having plagiarized from him. The same year, she issued a book of interviews (Domniile lor domnii și doamnele; republished in 1969 as Stele și luceferi). The book is praised by Oprișan for cultivating "good communication" and "sobriety". It was however peculiar for its interview with Sadoveanu Sr, and also in that the interview between father and daughter was done through the mail.

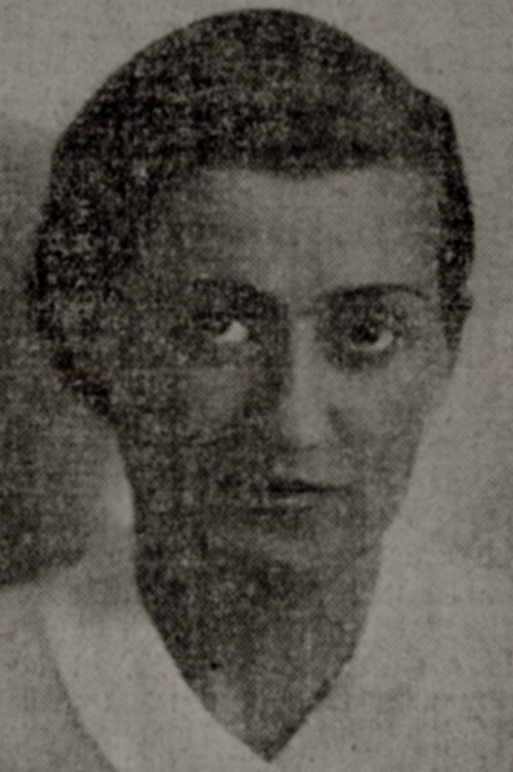
Sadoveanu in 1937

As revealed in a 1935 letter by Topîrceanu (only published in 2014), Domniile lor was actually co-written by Profira and Costache Popa; the latter was well-liked by Sadoveanu Sr for his other activity as an interior designer. From 1935, the Popas had moved to Bucharest, the national capital, which was also Mihail's home after he agreed to take over as director of Adevărul newspaper (in 1936). Co-opted by that institution, Profira had memoirs published in the collective column Femeile între ele ("Women amongst Themselves"), managed by her aunt Izabela (and also featuring authors such as Ticu Archip, Lucia Demetrius, Coca Farago, Claudia Millian, and Sanda Movilă). She also published more reportage pieces, collecting them, alongside prose poems, in the 1940 volume Ploi și ninsori ("Rains and Snowfall", 1940). Burța-Cernat sees it as a "less significant" contribution, centered on the depiction of "yesterday's târguri and patriarchal life."

In 1939 or 1940, Profira and her husband translated and published the Earl of Lytton's biography of Antony Bulwer-Lytton. It was put out by the official publishing house, Editura Fundațiilor Regale (EFR), in a conscious effort to familiarize Romanians with the more unfamiliar aspects of British society (and also to provide the public with a higher standard of translation from English). The EFR also selected Profira as head editor of her father's novels in what was supposed to be a definitive edition. Five volumes appeared during World War II. From 1936, Profira had been involved with caring for her mother, who was bedridden with illness. Ecaterina died in 1942, after a series of embolisms.

== World War II ==
The Sadoveanus' literary activity was threatened in late 1940 and early 1941, when the radically fascist Iron Guard controlled Romania as a "National Legionary State", physically destroying old-regime figures such as Nicolae Iorga. As reported years later by author Mihail Șerban, a period witness, Profira and her husband were living together with Mihail; shocked by news of the Iorga assassination, they took turns guarding the place against any possible Guardist attack. A diary entry by Mihail Sebastian records his meeting with Profira, who confessed that her father was considering applying for membership in the Guard, noting that he was urged to do so by friends Ionel and Păstorel Teodoreanu. In a 1980 interview, Ionel's widow Ștefana Velisar mentions a mock-trial of Mihail Sadoveanu being carried through by a group of Guardists—her husband, a trained lawyer, was present to offer Sadoveanu's defense: "Ionel spoke for four and half hours. When he was done, instead of shooting him, they fired their pistols into the ceiling, and cartridges fell down on their plates."

As the National Legionary State gave way to Ion Antonescu's military regime, Profira was employed by Gorjanul publishing house, translating Charles Dickens' Oliver Twist (announced for publication in December 1943). Sadoveanu's next work was a selection of lyrical poems called Umilinți ("Humiliations", early 1944). This was volume was rediscovered by Oprișan, who describes its content as "flowing verse of acute condensation, steadily punctured by a metaphysical shiver." Most copies, displayed at Cartea Românească, were destroyed in an American air raid. As recounted by Sebastian, in April 1944, as the Red Army was pushing back into Romania, the Sadoveanus were still staunch anti-communists, and presented themselves as supporters of the National Peasants' Party (PNȚ). He renders Profira's worried statement: Tata nu poate înghiți pe bolșevici și de aceea cred că el va pleca în Elveția, dacă ei s-ar apropia de Capitală ("Father can't stand those Bolsheviks, and this is why I believe he'll be departing for Switzerland, should they ever come close to the Capital").

In summer 1944, Profira had left Bucharest for a temporary refuge in the city of Sibiu. Sadoveanu Sr came to pick her up, and reunited all his daughters at Bradu-Strâmb, a remote cabin in the Cindrel Mountains. Here, she wrote the poems published in 1946 as Scrisori din Sihăstrie ("Letters of Seculsion"). According to an article published 40 years later, it was also here that she heard news of the successful anti-fascist coup, which saw Romania discarding its alliance with the Axis powers and opening up to the Allies. She notes that the Sadoveanus were enthusiastic, celebrating a "Day of Liberation". With the continuation of war against the Axis and the onset of Soviet occupation, the family lost another member, Paul-Mihu. He was killed in action on the Northern Transylvanian front, in the Battle of Turda, where the Romanian forces and the Red Army confronted the Wehrmacht. Profira was devastated by the loss, but corrected for print his one novel, "crying, wailing, and cursing" throughout the process.

In addition to Scrisori din Sihăstrie, Profira contributed a Romanian version of Adolphe d'Ennery and Eugène Cormon's The Two Orphans, taken up by the National Theater Iași in 1945. She also worked on a translation of Maxwell Anderson's versified social play, Winterset. It was published in 1946 as Pogoară Iarna, and was praised by Anglist Petru Comarnescu for being "so very faithful and relevant" to the source material. In early 1947, Frimu Workers' Theater and Marin Iorda produced Jerome K. Jerome's The Passing of the Third Floor Back, from a translation by Sadoveanu. In collaboration with the Romanian Society for Friendship with the Soviet Union, she issued versions of poems by Ivan Krylov, Mikhail Lermontov, Vladimir Mayakovsky, Nikolay Nekrasov, and Alexander Pushkin. These were not immediately printed, but rather recited publicly by children from Bucharest's Lyceum No 50 during a bilingual gala. She also prepared another musical comedy, Țăndărică și Borzacul ("Matchwood Boy and His Imp"), which was in production with the Bucharest puppet theater in December 1948.

== As presidential daughter ==
During the onset of communization, Costache Popa was employed as artistic director by George Enescu Philharmonic Orchestra. On Christmas Day 1947, he reacted against political pressures by supporting its conductor, George Georgescu, who had been virtually banned from performing. The communist regime, inaugurated days after, had Sadoveanu Sr as a main literary figure. Seen by literary historian Mircea Iorgulescu as protected in a "gilded shelter", he also served for a while as the republican head of state. Immediately after the regime change, Profira edited a sixth volume of her father's works, this time curated by the new state enterprise, Editura de Stat pentru Literatură și Artă (ESPLA); the project was abruptly interrupted, for unknown causes, and only resumed from 1954.

Profira's life was enmeshed with her father's political offices. In August 1949, after she had contracted malaria in Târgu Neamț, she was cared for with antibiotics by the bacteriologist Mihai Ciucă, then allowed to recover in her father's suit at the Palace of the Republic. Later that decade, she and her sisters also used the Presidium Villa and Pelișor Castle, both of them located in the mountain resort of Sinaia. Despite Mihail's new status, Costache Popa had found himself in trouble with the governing authorities. In 1950, he had trafficked messages between the members of the since-outlawed PNȚ and his own sister, who was asked to help them go into hiding. The Securitate intercepted these notes, arresting Popa and various members of his family, including his niece Ioana Hudiță-Berindei.

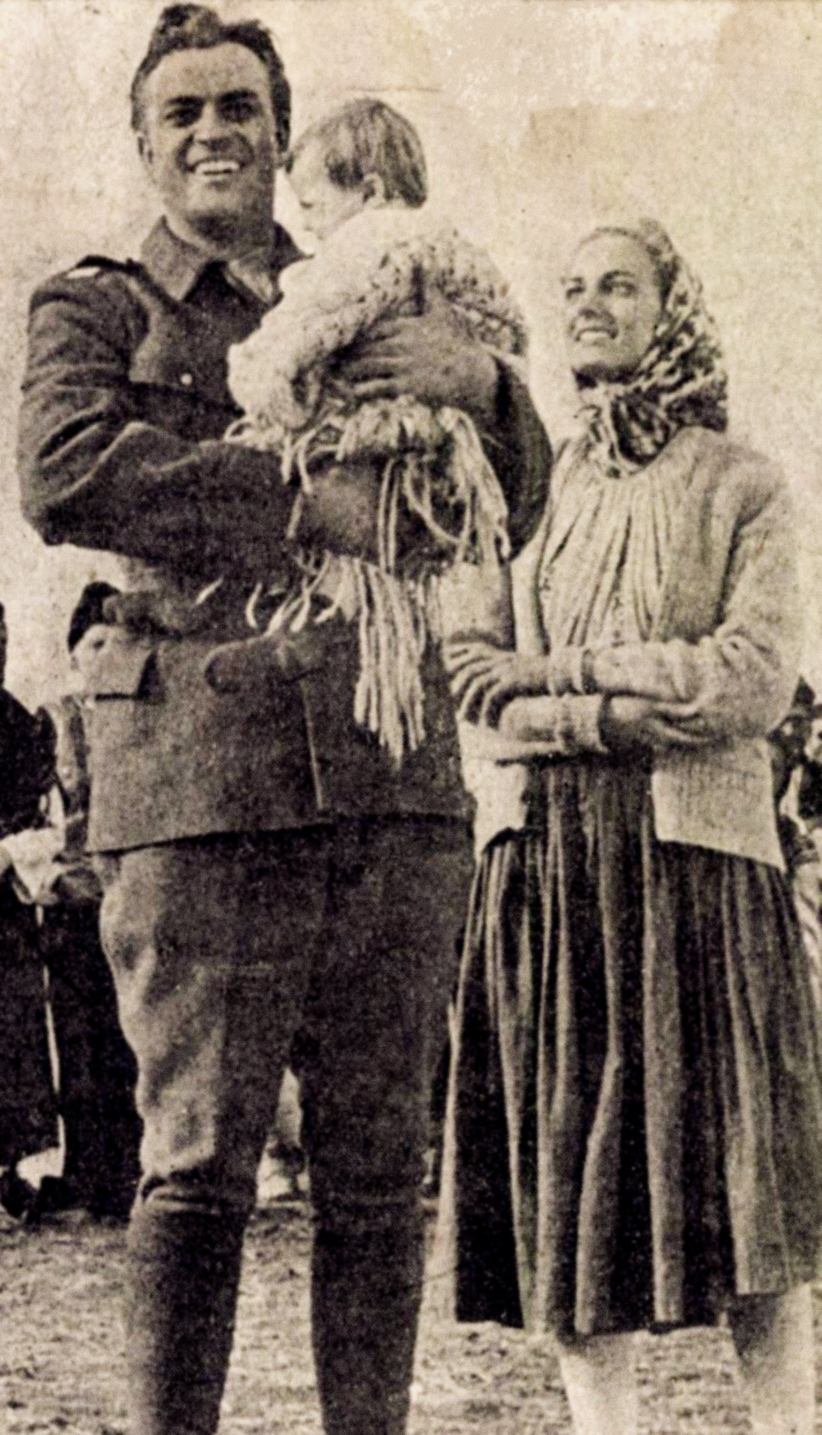
Scene from Mitrea Cocor, depicting Mitrea (Septimiu Sever) and his wife (Aurelia Sorescu) as they inaugurate a village land reform

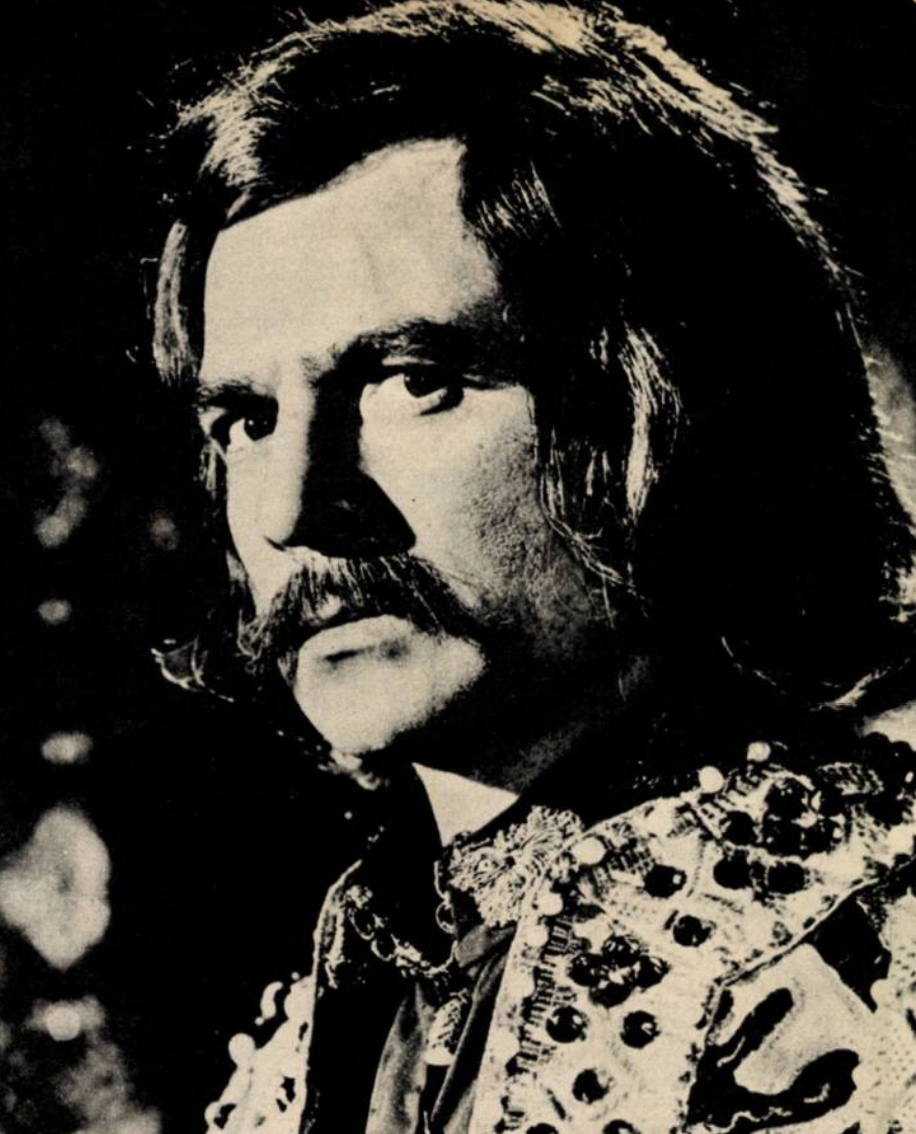
Gheorghe Cozorici, in-character as Stephen the Great, for the filming of Frații Jderi (May 1973)

Alongside Valeria Mitru, who had become Mihail's second wife, Profira was intensely active as a translator. They earned accolades with Alexander Ostrovsky's Wolves and Sheep, which was taken up by the Workers' Theater in January 1950. Alone or in collaboration, Profira also translated Anton Chekhov, Konstantin Ushinsky, Honoré de Balzac, and Peter Neagoe; the latter contributions were described by critic Șerban Cioculescu as "excellent". Mihail, Valeria and Profira had all transitioned to Socialist Realism: the latter two Sadoveanus wrote the screenplay version of Mihail's communist novel, Mitrea Cocor; the 1952 film version, directed by Marietta Sadova and Victor Iliu, took the "social progress award" at Karlovy Vary International Film Festival. In later decades, Profira defended Mitrea Cocor as a genuine work by her father, against voices which suggested that it had been ghostwritten by Dumitru Ciurezu.

Profira was also involved in the renewed effort to republish and annotate her father's books, with some 40 installments appearing as luxury editions at ESPLA. Histriographer Marin Bucur praised the contribution: "Profira Sadoveanu's notes, which are featured in each volume, are always bringing up something new, or in any case very obscure, and some interesting details, providing the sort of material that a critical exegete or a literary historian will surely find useful." In one of the tomes, printed in 1958, she identified the character Levi Tov with Jewish scholar Moshe Duff, who had been her father's close friend. This identification was rejected by journalist Simon Schafferman-Păstorescu, who argued that it had no basis in fact. Among the final events of her father's life, Profira Sadoveanu witnessed and recounted the intellectual drive behind his 1954 novel, Cîntecul mioarei (purposefully conceived as a less "artificial" rendering of the Miorița myth, and in direct opposition to the version standardized by Alecsandri).

As early as 1953, Profira was rediscovering Chritianity, writing to Câmpan that having faith was a beautiful thing. Shortly before Mihail's death in 1961, father and daughter returned for a visit to Fălticeni. Burța-Cernat sees Profira as a participant in his posthumous "cult". On his first commemoration, in October 1962, Viața Romînească hosted two of her poems of mourning, one of which was called La moartea tatii ("On Father's Death"). The same year, Editura Tineretului put out her volume Vînătoare domnească ("A Princely Hunt"). Enthusiastically prefaced by Demostene Botez, it reportedly contained poems that Mihail had selected as his favorites. Around then, she was approached by the scholar-novelist George Călinescu, who intended to write a massive and minutely detailed biography of Sadoveanu Sr, with humorous tinges, and wanted her as his co-author. She declined ("telling him I intended to use this subject matter for myself"), but later acknowledged that she regretted her decision.

== Later life ==
Strongly influenced by her father's literary style, Profira Sadoveanu adopted his florid descriptions—as critic Mihai Zamfir notes, this was to the point of pastiche; however, as other critics observe, she infused her writing with a purely feminine sensibility. Her poetry was sometimes directly modeled on Le Testament, by François Villon. Sadoveanu's extensive literary output came to include volumes recalling Mihail Sadoveanu (O zi cu Sadoveanu, 1955; Viața lui Mihail Sadoveanu, 1957, republished in 1966 as Ostrovul zimbrului; În umbra stejarului, 1965; Planeta părăsită, 1970), but also new collections of poems: Somnul pietrei ("The Sleep of Stones", 1971); Cântecele lui Ștefan Vodă ("Songs of Voivode Stephen", 1974); Flori de piatră ("Stone Flowers", 1980); Ora violetă ("The Violet Hour", 1984). She had not abandoned her ambitions as a playwright: in 1958, she and Teodora were trying to finish a "comedic fantasy" called Fuga Milenelor ("Flight of the Milenas"); on her own, she also began sketching a family saga modeled on Jalna, called Sadovenii. In tandem, Profira specialized in children's verses, published as Balaurul alb ("The White Balaur", 1955) and Ochelarii bunicii ("Grandma's Glasses", 1969). A reprint of Mormolocul came with the announcement that Sadoveanu had presented another volume, Rechinul ("The Shark"), but publication stalled.

Profira and Teodora together completed in 1964 the first-ever Romanian rendition of stories by William Saroyan, for which she also contributed the preface. Three years later, she put out by herself a version of Anatole France's Red Lily. Her last published translation, in 1976, was Eudora Welty's Losing Battles. Sadoveanu shares writing credits with Mircea Drăgan and Alexandru Mitru for the 1974 film Frații Jderi, which is based on Sadoveanu Sr's historical novel of the same name. She reportedly joined the crew on location, directly supervising production. A contemporary review by Dinu Kivu rated the resulting film as a disappointment, largely because of Drăgan's inconsistencies as a director. Around 1980, she was advising Draga Olteanu-Matei in writing a screenplay based on a children's story by Mihail Sadoveanu. She was enthusiastic about the project, but not about the resulting film, Dumbrava minunată; as Olteanu-Matei acknowledged in a 1989 interview, her criticism was "entirely appropriate" (pe bună dreptate). Later contributions include a teleplay version of Pogoară Iarna, produced and aired on Romanian Television in September 1982 (Dinu Cernescu was the director, and Gelu Nițu the star actor).

Sadoveanu was a widow from 18 September 1981, when Costache Popa, still employed by the Philharmonic Orchestra, suffered a fatal accident. In December 1984, România Literară hosted eight of her sonnets, which staff chroniclers at Transilvania magazine described as a "pleasant reminder". The following year, she completed a book of her own stories and memoirs, put out by Editura Ion Creangă as Foc de artificii ("Fireworks"). It was meant to cover biographical detail that Mihail had not been interested in discussing—one partly fictionalized story describes a literary hoax that her father had attempted in complicity with Topîrceanu and Garabet Ibrăileanu. Another such volume, Planeta părăsită ("Deserted Planet"), was published in 1987 by Editura Minerva—and welcomed by Cioculescu, who read it as an extensive prose poem, and by Oprișan, who appreciated its "peculiar charm". Rechinul also appeared, presenting in its definitive version as the found manuscript of "Mariana Val".

Around that time, Profira and Teodora made return trips to Fălticeni, where her childhood home was turned into a memorial museum in 1987. In 1989, they declared themselves impressed by the town's modernization under communism, and announced that they had considered moving back. Also then, Profira published Destăinuiri ("Confessions"), mentioning her past encounters with various literary doyens. She lived through the Romanian Revolution of 1989, which marked the end of local communism. Around 1992, she and Teodora had withdrawn to Valeria Sadoveanu's house outside Putna Monastery in Bukovina, a short distance away from fellow women writers—Ștefana Velisar and Zoe Dumitrescu-Bușulenga. In 1993, she was included in a dictionary of Bukovina literature, but the biographical detail, as noted by scholar Dan Mănucă, was unexplainably sketchy or unreliable.

During the 1990s, Profira had a steady correspondence with scholar Constantin Ciopraga, who also interviewed her during summer pilgrimages that they both undertook at Văratec and Agapia. Aged 92 in January 1997, she raised controversy for accepting an award from the Greater Romania Party, a radical nationalist group led by Corneliu Vadim Tudor. Reporting on this in the Hungarian Romanian newspaper Erdélyi Napló, Kázmér Vajnovszki described her and her co-recipient Radu Boureanu (aged 91) as "forgotten persons". Sadoveanu died in Bucharest on 3 October 2003.
