= Sadoveanu (surname) =

Sadoveanu is a Romanian name, most often used in reference to writer and politician Mihail Sadoveanu. Other persons with this surname include:

- Ion Marin Sadoveanu (born Iancu-Leonte Marinescu), novelist and journalist
- Izabela Sadoveanu-Evan (born Izabela Morțun), literary critic, educationist and feminist, Mihail Sadoveanu's sister-in-law
- Marietta Sadova (or Marietta Sadoveanu), actress and director, Ion Marin Sadoveanu's wife, and later Haig Acterian's wife
- Paul-Mihu Sadoveanu, novelist, Mihail Sadoveanu's son
- Profira Sadoveanu, novelist and poet, Mihail Sadoveanu's daughter

== See also ==
- Mihail Sadoveanu High School
