= Nicolae Gane =

Moldavian-born Romanian writer and poet (1838–1916)

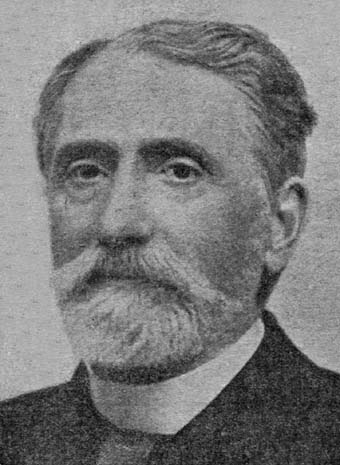
Nicolae Gane

Nicolae Gane (February 1, 1838 – April 16, 1916) was a Moldavian, later Romanian prose writer, poet, and politician.

== Biography ==
Born in Fălticeni, his family were boyars of small and medium importance; his parents were postelnic Matei Gane and his wife Ruxandra (née Văsescu). He began his education at the primary school founded in his native town by Neofit Scriban, followed by Louis Jourdan's French boarding school in Iași. Gane intended to study fine arts in Paris, but encountering opposition from his family, opted instead for a government career. Thanks to his connections, he obtained a position in Iași as secretary and translator for Moldavia's director of prisons. He resigned after a day and returned to Fălticeni, where he was named a member of the Suceava County tribunal. He was dismissed during demonstrations backing the union of the Principalities in 1857, and restored in 1860, following the union, as president of the same tribunal.

Over the next several years, he alternated jobs in the magistracy with administrative ones, migrating through several Moldavian towns in the process; his positions included prefect of Suceava County (1863) and later of Dorohoi County. In 1864, he joined the Focșani appeals court, but the following year, transferred to a similar position at Iași, where he settled for the remainder of his life. A member of the Romanian Freemasonry, he attained the rank of Master Mason in 1866.

His appeals court colleague Vasile Pogor and the brothers Iacob and Leon C. Negruzzi introduced Gane to the recently founded Junimea society, of which he remained a leading member, even though in 1883 he joined its political rival, the National Liberal Party (PNL). His lengthy political career included two stints as prefect of Iași County (1870, 1901), five terms as mayor of Iași (1872-1876; 1881; 1887-1888; 1896-1899; 1907-1911), a seat in the Assembly of Deputies in nearly every PNL-controlled legislature, and, from November 1897 to April 1899, the presidency of the Senate. In March 1888, when PNL leader Ion C. Brătianu reshuffled the cabinet in a moment of crisis, he named two new ministers. One of them was Gane, who received the Agriculture, Industry, Commerce and Domains portfolio; the government went on to serve for three weeks. During Gane's time as mayor, his city acquired paved roads and gas lighting, as well as a new building for the Iași National Theatre in 1896.

Gane made his literary debut in Junimea's Convorbiri Literare in 1867, with the short story "Fluierul lui Ștefan". Over the years until 1886, the same magazine published the writings he managed to put together during his time off, periodically published in book form (Novele, I-II, 1880; Novele, I-III, 1886). He also tried his hand at poetry (Poezii, 1873; Poezii, 1886), but was more successful as a prose writer; his sentimental and nostalgic stories were widely read in his day and appreciated by later authors. In addition, he wrote several memoiristic accounts. After 1906, he preferred to publish in Viața Românească. Elected a corresponding member of the Romanian Academy in 1882, he rose to titular member in 1908, was president of its literary section in 1912, and vice president of the Academy from 1912 to 1913. In 1906, he published a translation of Dante Alighieri's Inferno, written in imperfect tercets.

His wife Sofia was the daughter of Pavel Stoianovici, a Serb who had arrived from Bessarabia around 1827, and of Pavel's wife, the daughter of a Greek and Bulgarian rakia-maker at Bucharest's Curtea Veche. The couple had five daughters and three sons; two became magistrates and one a cavalry officer, and all the children who married took spouses from among the Moldavian boyar families. Three Gane-related sites in Iași are listed as historic monuments by Romania's Ministry of Culture and Religious Affairs: his early 19th-century house, now a museum; his 1943 bust, located in Copou Park; and his grave in Eternitatea cemetery. Nicu Gane National College in Fălticeni bore his name from 1923 to 1948, and has again done so since 1970.

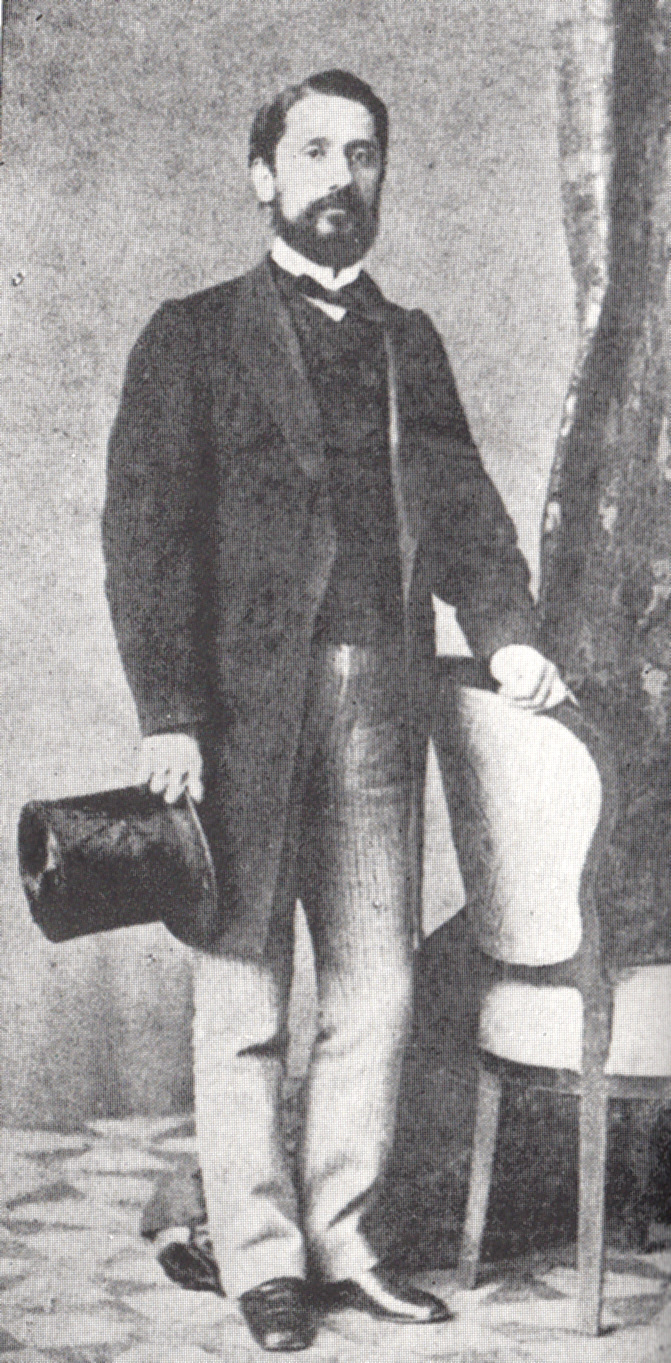
Gane as a younger man

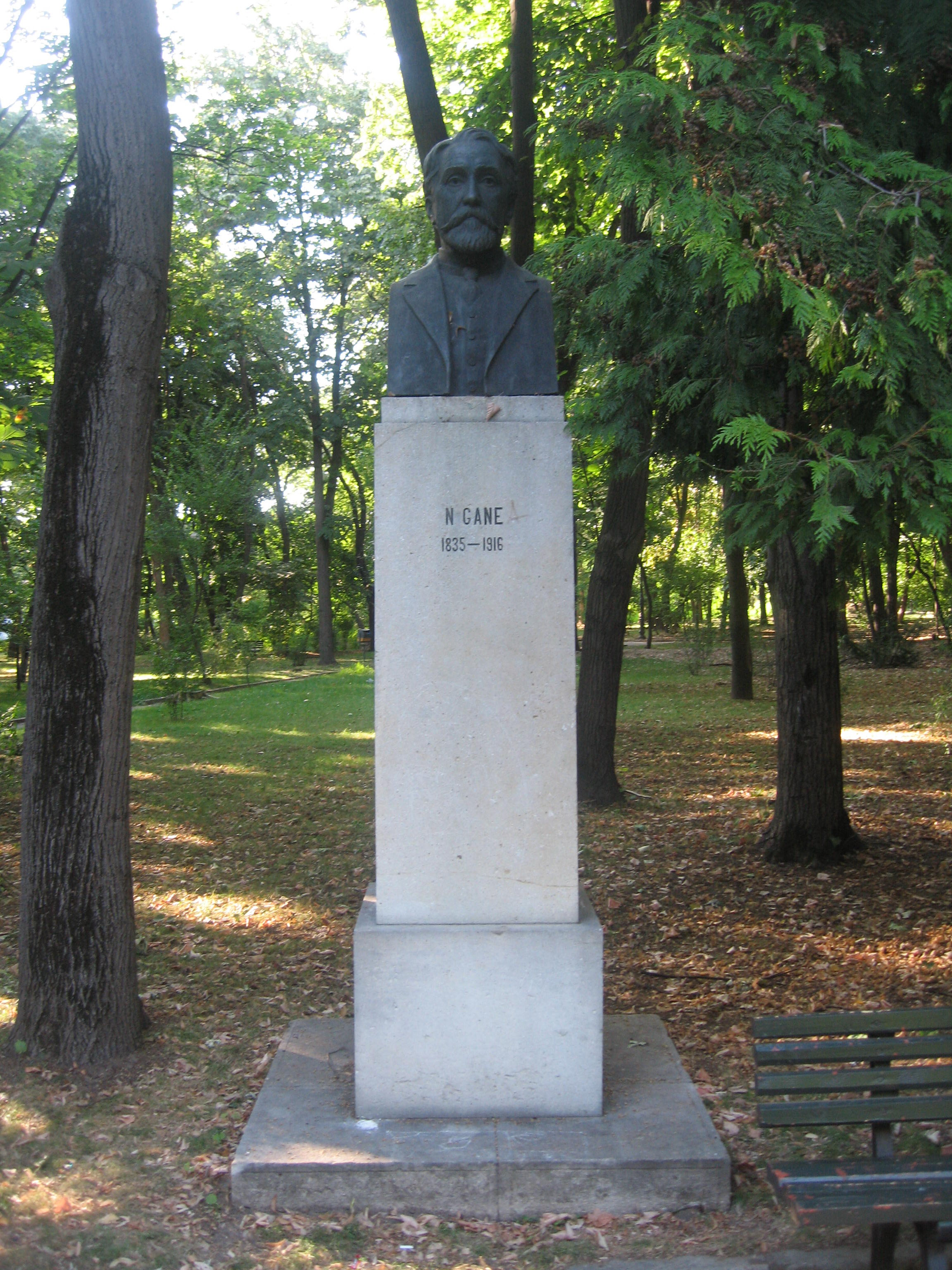
Bust in Copou Park
