= Peter Neagoe =

American novelist

Peter Neagoe (7 November 1881 in Odorhei, Austria-Hungary – 28 October 1960 in Woodstock, New York) was an American writer and painter. Born in Transylvania, the majority of his work was interested in his native Romanian folk life.

== Personal life ==
After attending primary and secondary school in Săliște, Sibiu and Blaj, he moved to Bucharest in 1900 where he studied at the Romanian Academy of Fine Arts and was a colleague of Constantin Brâncuși. At the same time, he also took courses in philosophy and law at the University of Bucharest.

Between 1901 and 1903 he left the country without parental consent, and after a short stay in Germany emigrated to America. Arriving in New York City in 1906 he worked at several different jobs, while continuing his art studies at the National Academy of Design and the Art Students Association. He was married in 1911 to Anna Frankeul, a painter.

After World War I he returned to Europe, settling in Paris. There he came into contact with Dadaist and Surrealist painters of the time and was reunited with Brâncuși, to whom he dedicated his book The Saint of Montparnasse (published posthumously in 1965). He also stayed intermittently during some summers with the Shakers at Mount Lebanon Shaker Village, where he spent some time during his youth in America.

In 1933 Neagoe returned to the United States, publishing two novels in the next three years and a volume of stories on topics of Transylvanian and Romanian history. He visited Romania as the guest of the Romanian Writers' Society in April 1937.

During World War II he worked at the U.S. Army Intelligence Bureau. His writing output decreased during this time, until he returned to literature with an autobiography of his boyhood, A Time to Keep (1949).

His personal friends included James Joyce, Ezra Pound and Gertrude Stein. His major work was well reviewed, but his publishers found that it had little public appeal - on his death his papers were found to contain hundreds of unpublished short stories. The papers of Neagoe and his wife are at Syracuse University in Syracuse, New York. The English Department at Syracuse offered a competitive creative writing award for graduate students in his name.

== Works ==
- Storm, 1932
- Easter Sun, 1934
- There is My Heart, 1935
- Winning a Wife, 1936
- A Time to Keep, 1949
- No Time for Tears, 1959
- The Saint of Montparnasse, 1965
