= Nicu Gane National College =

- Colegiul Național "Nicu Gane"
- Nicu Gane National College in Fălticeni

Location
- 105 Sucevei Street; Fălticeni, Suceava County; Romania

Information
- Type: National college
- Motto: "Education for all who are willing to receive it"
- Established: 2 November 1870
- Principal: Codrin Bența
- Deputy director: Luminița-Claudia Corbu
- Grades: Lower and upper secondary
- Website: https://nicugane.ro/nou/acasa/

Nicu Gane National College (Romanian: Colegiul Național "Nicu Gane") is a high school located in Fălticeni, Suceava County, Romania.

The school is organised into science and humanities tracks, with specialisations in mathematics and computer science, natural sciences, philology and social sciences. It has held national college status since 1999.

The school traces its origins to 1870, when the Alexandru Ioan I Gymnasium was founded as the first secondary education institution in Fălticeni. In 1892 the gymnasium moved into its present building and was renamed after Alecu Donici. In 1923 it was raised to the rank of a full high school and took the name of Nicu Gane, the writer and politician. Throughout the 20th century the institution operated under various names and structures, shaped by successive reforms of the Romanian education system. Its historical name was restored in 1970, and its humanistic curriculum after 1990.

The school holds Erasmus+ accreditation and is a member of the Alliance of Centenary Colleges. Local educational literature describes it as a long-established school with a substantial historical archive. Its history is documented in monographs and in school and national publications, which cover its structural changes, its place in the regional school network and its role in the cultural history of the Fălticeni area.

== History ==
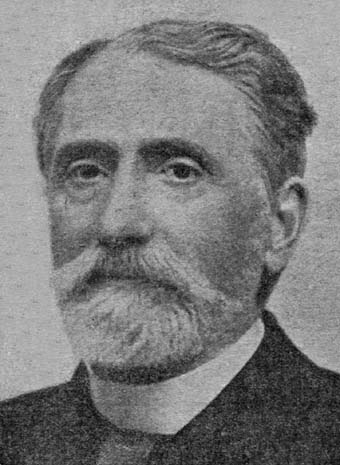
Nicolae Gane, Romanian writer, member of the Romanian Academy and politician

=== Founding and early years (1870–1923) ===
The idea of a gymnasium in Fălticeni emerged during the modernisation that followed the union of the Romanian Principalities in 1859, and it was backed by the local authorities from the 1860s. On 3 September 1870 the standing committee for the founding of the gymnasium asked the Ministry of Public Instruction for an operating permit, which was granted in October 1870.

The Alexandru Ioan I Gymnasium opened on 2 November 1870 with a single class of 20 pupils, in a room of the prefecture building. The official opening was marked by a Te Deum at the town's cathedral, and the gymnasium became the first lower-secondary school in Fălticeni.

Alecu Donici, fabulist poet

In its first years the gymnasium had only one grade, and further grades were added gradually. By 1874 the institution had four gymnasium classes and had produced its first graduating class from the lower cycle. The growing number of classes required a larger teaching staff: in the 1873–74 school year six teachers were employed, in addition to the drawing teacher, who also served as the town architect. The early teachers included Vasile Balomir (the first director of the Alecu Donici Gymnasium), Nicolae Beldiceanu, V. T. Lovinescu and A. R. Wagner, and the pupils of the first generations included Arthur Gorovei and Ștefan Șoldănescu.

Between 1870 and 1892 the school was known as the Fălticeni Gymnasium, while formally keeping the name "Alexandru Ioan I". The new school building was completed in 1892 and was known at the time as the "School Palace". In the winter of 1892 the gymnasium moved into these premises, which the college was still using in 2025. With the move, the institution was renamed the Alecu Donici Gymnasium, after the poet and fabulist Alecu Donici. The school library was founded in 1893.

In the late 19th and early 20th centuries the gymnasium continued to operate with four lower classes, while gradually broadening what it offered. Under the reforms promoted by minister Spiru Haret and the 1898 education law, upper classes funded outside the state budget were organised alongside the gymnasium classes in the 1910s, anticipating the later development of a full eight-year high school cycle. A contemporary official record attests that these upper classes existed before 1923.

World War I seriously disrupted the school. The gymnasium building was temporarily turned into a Russian military hospital, and in the 1916–17 school year the gymnasium did not operate normally, with examinations taken privately. Classes resumed after the end of hostilities, and by the time of the semicentenary celebrated in 1921, 47 graduating classes totalling 859 pupils had passed through the school. As Fălticeni still had no high school with full rights, steps were taken to turn the gymnasium into a standalone high school.

On 1 April 1923 the Ministry of Public Instruction approved raising the gymnasium to the rank of high school. The Monitorul Oficial announced the founding of the Nicu Gane High School, with eight high school classes funded from the state budget. For a time, the upper classes previously funded outside the budget continued to operate as private education. The new high school was named after the writer and politician Nicolae (Nicu) Gane, a member of the Romanian Academy and a native of Fălticeni. The high school's first class graduated in the 1923–24 school year, which shows that some of the pupils in the former gymnasium's upper classes were absorbed into the new high school.

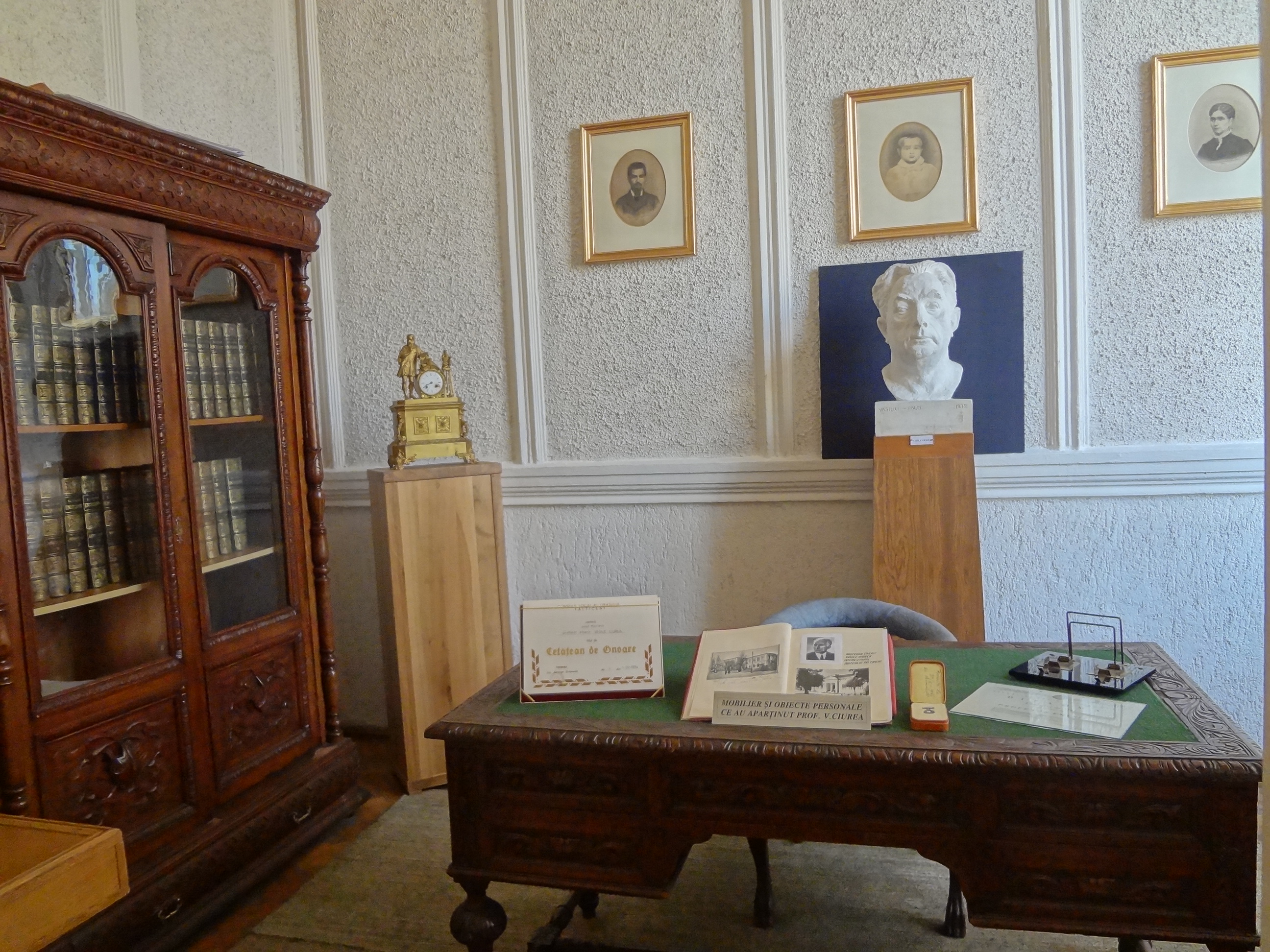
The desk of teacher Vasile Ciurea, on display at the Mihai Băcescu Museum of Waters in Fălticeni

==== Structure and early generations ====
Between 1870 and 1892, under the name Alexandru Ioan I Gymnasium, the institution's main aim was to consolidate its teaching staff and to educate its first generations of graduates, who later held important positions in the cultural and administrative life of the region. Between 1892 and 1923, as the Alecu Donici Gymnasium, the school operated in its own building, with a library and a stable teaching activity. Teachers of this period included Nicolae Apostol (phytologist and philosopher), Aurel George Stino (writer), Anastase Spiridonescu (Latin teacher) and Mihai Stamatin (scientist and biologist). Pupils included Mihail Sadoveanu (writer and politician), Eugen Lovinescu (writer and member of the Romanian Academy), Aurel Băeșu (painter), Constantin Ureche, Aurel George Stino, Anton Holban (novelist and essayist) and Vasile Ciurea (natural sciences specialist).

The 1921 semicentenary was marked by anniversary events; at that point the institution was the town's main secondary school, with a large number of graduates and an established educational tradition.

=== High school status, the interwar period and the war (1923–1947) ===
After 1923 the institution operated as a standalone high school under the name Nicu Gane High School. Initially it had eight classes, matching the full high school cycle of the time. In the following years the organisation of studies was adjusted to changes in education legislation: in 1928–29 the high school graduated its first class after a cycle shortened to seven years, and from the 1934–35 school year the eight-year cycle was restored. Throughout the interwar period, Nicu Gane High School was a state high school for boys; girls were educated separately, at the Fălticeni Girls' Gymnasium.

In July 1925 the school was visited by the historian and statesman Nicolae Iorga, who gave lectures and talks for pupils and teachers. In 1930 Iorga was invited again and honoured in the high school's gymnasium hall. In September 1931 the school organised events marking the 50th birthday of the writer Mihail Sadoveanu, a pupil of the Fălticeni gymnasium in the 1890s, who attended.

The high school developed science laboratories and specialised classrooms, and its teaching staff consisted of subject specialists, some of them former pupils of the school. Teachers of the interwar period included Aurel George Stino, Dan Protopopescu, Virgil Tempeanu, Grigore Ilie, Nicolae Tolea, Sorin Gorovei, Gheorghe Ursu and Vasile Ciurea. Pupils of the same period who later became known in various fields included the sculptor Ion Irimescu, the actors Grigore Vasiliu-Birlic and Jules Cazaban, the writers Horia Lovinescu and Constantin Ciopraga, the literary critic Mihai Gafița and the marine biologist Mihai Băcescu, along with other graduates who made careers in academia, culture or public administration.

The school's work was also affected by World War II. In the 1940–41 school year some pupils and teachers were mobilised or otherwise involved in the war effort, which disrupted normal classes. In the 1943–44 school year teaching ended early, and final marks were based on first-semester results; an official record dated 23 March 1944 documents the closing of the school year for classes I–VIII.

In the summer of 1944 the high school building was damaged and temporarily used by the military authorities, and teaching was suspended until the end of hostilities. After the war, in 1945, the high school resumed classes in peacetime conditions, but the political changes that followed led, from 1948, to a thorough reorganisation of education.

=== Communist regime and reorganisation of education (1948–1989) ===
The education reform of August 1948, introduced by the communist regime, brought major changes to the school's structure and name. The Nicu Gane Boys' High School was nationalised and, between 1948 and 1951, operated as a state high school with 11 grades, in line with the new system. The reform reshaped the school network, and in 1952, with the general introduction of coeducation, the institution was reorganised as Fălticeni Mixed Secondary School No. 1, with a 10-year and later an 11-year cycle, admitting both boys and girls. The town's former girls' high school operated as Secondary School No. 2.

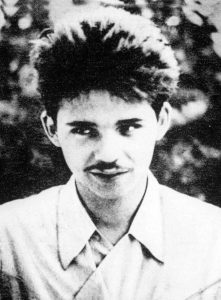
Nicolae Labiș, Romanian poet and former pupil of the school

In the 1950–51 school year a significant number of final-year pupils were expelled on political grounds, and several were detained by the security services. According to contemporary accounts, the incident was triggered by a protest connected with the Russian language examinations, followed by investigations and sanctions. In the same period some teachers, among them Sorin Ștefan Gorovei and Vasile Gh. Popa, were dismissed and persecuted for political reasons, and former pupils such as Eugen Dimitriu were held as political prisoners in the 1950s.

Despite these pressures, the school continued its work, adapting to the curriculum and ideological requirements of the time. The poet Nicolae Labiș, a pupil in grades VIII and IX, won first prize nationally in a Romanian language competition for secondary schools in 1951. Following the arrival of Greek refugees after the Greek Civil War, a class for Greek children settled in Fălticeni operated temporarily at the school in 1952–53.

The institution continued to diversify in the 1960s. A physics laboratory, set up by teacher Constantin Popa, was established in 1964. In 1965, when general education was extended to 12 years, the school was renamed Fălticeni High School No. 1, a name it kept until 1970. In this period, alongside theoretical subjects, increasing emphasis was placed on science education.

Mihail Sadoveanu, Romanian writer and politician, former pupil of the school

At the centenary celebrated in November 1970, the authorities approved a return to the traditional name, and the school became Nicu Gane High School again. On this occasion the first monograph of the high school was published, written by the teachers Mihai Iacobescu and Gheorghe Gafencu (director, school inspector and history teacher), covering the institution's development from its founding to the jubilee. In the second half of the 1970s, in line with the educational policy of the time, the institution's technical profile was strengthened. In 1977 the high school was converted into a mechanical-profile unit with mathematics–physics classes, and in 1980, with the creation of vocational classes in (industrial) mechanics and special mathematics–physics classes, it became Nicu Gane Industrial High School. In this form the school combined theoretical classes (science and humanities) with technological ones.

Cultural and scientific activity continued during the industrial period. The Society of Philological Sciences held sessions in Fălticeni devoted to the former pupils Mihail Sadoveanu (1980), Eugen Lovinescu (1981) and Nicolae Labiș (1986), and to Nicu Gane (1988). The Writers' Union of Romania, led by Dumitru Radu Popescu, organised meetings with the pupils, and writers from Iași and Suceava were frequently invited to school events. The "Days of the High School" were launched in 1988 and have since brought together many graduates, among them the academician Constantin Ciopraga.

In the 1980s, despite the emphasis on technical subjects, a significant number of the high school's graduates went on to higher education at universities in the country's major academic centres.

=== Post-communist period and modernisation (1990–present) ===
After the political changes of December 1989, the structure and profile of the high school were reorganised once more. From 1990 the institution was again a regular high school, named Nicu Gane High School, with classes organised in profiles such as mathematics–physics, chemistry–biology, computer science, philology, foreign languages, history–social sciences and physical education. Grades V–VIII were re-established in 1991, extending the school cycle again. The school's first computer laboratory was set up in the same year.

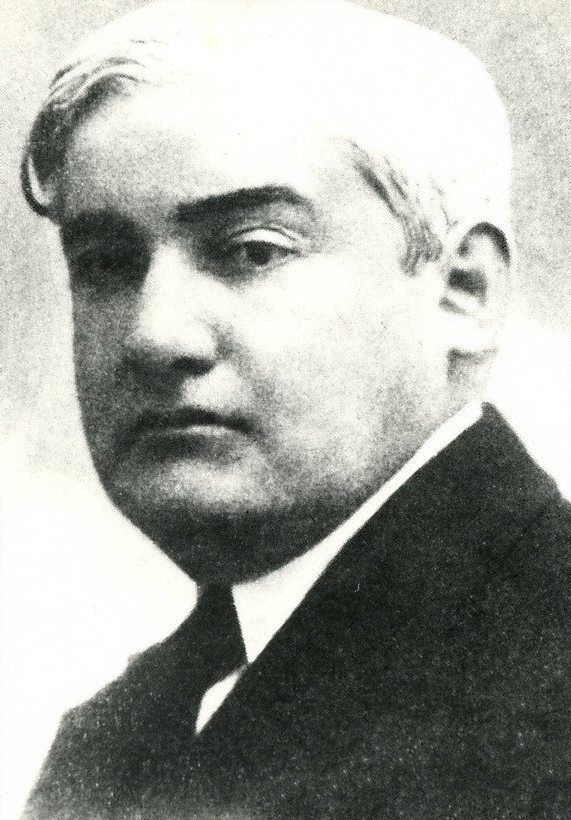
Eugen Lovinescu, writer and member of the Romanian Academy, former pupil of the school

Scientific and cultural activity continued through events and projects. On 14–15 July 1993 Eugen Lovinescu was commemorated 50 years after his death, with participants including the academicians Constantin Ciopraga and Eugen Simion and members of the academic community. In 1994 a new series of the school magazine Revista noastră began, and a modern English-language classroom was fitted out at the high school. Events marking the 125th anniversary of the founding of Nicu Gane High School took place on 19–20 May 1995.

In 1999 Nicu Gane High School was granted national college status and became Nicu Gane National College. The school teaches pupils from grade V to grade XII, in humanities and vocational tracks.

After 2000 the school went through an extensive process of modernisation and adaptation to the requirements of contemporary education. The computer laboratories were upgraded, new teaching spaces were created and the specialised classrooms were adapted to the new curricula. In 2003 a second monograph of the institution, Colegiul Național Nicu Gane (1870–2003), was published by the teachers Mioara Gafencu (writer and Romanian language teacher) and Sorin Gafencu (teacher and writer), documenting its history up to the beginning of the 21st century.

The college has hosted and organised many events with national and international participation. In June 2004 it was visited by participants in the National Romanian Language Olympiad for minorities. In 2005 it organised a Francophonie Week, with the participation of the television channel TV5, and in the same year the coordinators of a Comenius project from Latvia, Lithuania and Germany met in Fălticeni. Also in 2005, the pupils' annual show for their parents became an established tradition. On 6 December 2005 Nicu Gane National College hosted the Nicolae Labiș National Symposium, attended by Margareta Labiș (the poet's sister), academics and writers, as well as Romanian language and literature teachers from the town and the surrounding area.

In 2006 the college hosted a working meeting of the National Association of Teachers of Romanian Language and Literature (ANPRO) on the theme "Reading circles", as well as a symposium devoted to Eugen Lovinescu. In the same year an AEL laboratory was inaugurated with the support of the town hall and the parents' representative council, and work began on strengthening and refurbishing the main building, dating from 1892. As part of a Comenius project, the college hosted pupils and teachers from Italy, Turkey, Estonia, Latvia and other countries.

In 2008 the Alliance of Centenary Colleges was founded at Saint Sava National College in Bucharest; Nicu Gane National College is one of its members, along with other long-established colleges in the country.

At the same time, teaching was computerised, and the college took part in national and European educational programmes (Comenius, Erasmus, Euroscola) aimed at improving the quality of education and strengthening the school's European dimension. From the 2010s onwards, the college's pupils won many prizes and distinctions at county, national and international olympiads and competitions, in subjects such as Romanian language and literature, history, geography, foreign languages, economics, physics, chemistry, biology, computer science, Latin and religion. In 2007 a pupil, Alexandra Corbu, received an honourable mention at the International Philosophy Olympiad and won first prize at a pupils' music festival held in San Nicandro Garganico, Italy, where the college was represented by a group of pupils. The college has also held official Erasmus+ accreditation since 2022.

In 2011, teacher Ioan Caulea (writer and former deputy director) founded the school's debating club, LOGOS, whose teams have taken part in interdisciplinary competitions and olympiads, with results at national and county level. Under his guidance, in 2017 Nicu Gane National College was designated a "European Parliament Ambassador School", and in 2019 it placed second nationally in the "European School" competition, following an assessment of its activities in European education and EU-funded projects.

The college's main building (building A), constructed in 1892, underwent strengthening and refurbishment intended to preserve its architectural heritage features while adapting it to modern teaching requirements. New teaching spaces, computer laboratories and specialised classrooms were created, the library was digitised, and the sports facilities were extended and modernised.

The college's baccalaureate pass rate has consistently been above the national average, and a significant number of graduates are admitted each year to higher education institutions in Romania and abroad. The college has developed partnerships with schools and universities in other towns and countries, promoting exchanges and extracurricular projects.

At its 150th anniversary in 2020, the school received the Spiru Haret Anniversary Diploma from the Ministry of Education, in recognition of its contribution to Romanian education.

== Notable people ==
The college's pupils and graduates have included many figures from culture, science and public life. Among them are the writer Mihail Sadoveanu, the literary critic Eugen Lovinescu and his nephew, the playwright Horia Lovinescu, the poet Nicolae Labiș, the literary critic and historian Constantin Ciopraga, the prose writer and journalist Grigore Ilisei, the poet and diplomat Elena Ștefoi, the sculptor Ion Irimescu, the marine biologist Mihai Băcescu, and the actors Grigore Vasiliu-Birlic and Jules Cazaban.

Other former pupils who made a name for themselves in cultural, scientific or civic life include Arthur Gorovei, Dan Nemțeanu, Petre Jitaru, Mihai Șerban, Nicolae Grigoraș, Gheorghe Diaconescu, Aurel Loghin, Eugen Dimitriu, Mihai Gafița, Aurel Băeșu, Constantin Ureche, Aurel George Stino and Vasile Ciurea. The work of these former pupils is covered in literary histories, monographs, dictionaries and encyclopedias, and in specialist literature on the Fălticeni area. Graduates of the class of 1973 include Grigore Manolache, a ship's captain, and Viorel Gaftea, secretary at the Romanian Academy.

Among the college's teachers was Vasile Gh. Popa (1912–1976), a priest, folklorist and prose writer. He studied theology in Cernăuți from 1933 to 1939 and was ordained in 1939; after about seven years he left the priesthood and settled in Fălticeni as a teacher of Romanian and Latin at Nicu Gane High School, of which he became director within two years. He prepared Nicolae Labiș for the national poetry competition, at which Labiș won first prize. In 1959 he was arrested for his earlier political sympathies and sentenced to 15 years of hard labour; he was released under the 1964 amnesty. His collection of folklore from northern Moldavia was published by Editura Minerva in an edition prepared by Maria Luiza Ungureanu, and his memoirs, Din copilărie, appeared posthumously in 2003.

== Olympiads and academic results ==
From the early decades of the 20th century, and especially after the reorganisation following 1990, the institution has taken part regularly in school olympiads and competitions at county, national and international level. The college's pupils have repeatedly won prizes and honourable mentions in a range of subjects, including Romanian language and literature, history, geography, mathematics, physics, chemistry, biology, computer science, modern languages and Latin.

Since the 2000s, several groups of the college's pupils have represented Suceava County in national competitions, and some have taken part in international rounds, particularly in philosophy, foreign languages and the natural sciences. According to school reports and summaries published by the Suceava County School Inspectorate, the college is consistently among the schools with the highest number of qualifiers for the county and national rounds.

After 2015, results in the computer science, Romanian, French and geography olympiads made the college better known within Romania's network of national colleges.
