= Paul-Mihu Sadoveanu =

Romanian novelist (1920-1944)

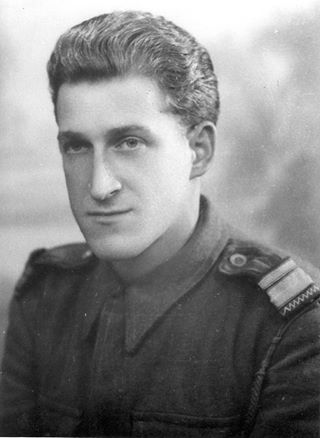
Paul-Mihu Sadoveanu in 1944

Paul-Mihu Sadoveanu (July 3, 1920–September 14, 1944) was a Romanian novelist.

Born in Iași, he was the youngest son of novelist Mihail Sadoveanu and his wife Ecaterina (née Bâlu). After attending primary school in his native city, followed by the local pedagogic high school, he entered Bucharest's Saint Sava High School and graduated in 1939. He then enrolled in the Law School of the University of Bucharest, studying there from 1940 to 1942. At that point, he was mobilized as part of Romania's ongoing involvement in World War II and sent to the school for reserve officers in Câmpulung, which he attended from 1942 to 1944. By then holding the rank of second lieutenant, he was assigned to a Sibiu-based regiment in 1944, with which he left for the Transylvanian front. He was killed in action at Turda (during the Battle of Turda), some three weeks after the 1944 Romanian coup d'état saw the country switch to the Allies. He is buried in the war heroes' cemetery at Alba Iulia.

Sadoveanu authored a single book, Ca floarea câmpului…, which he did not have time to polish completely. Published posthumously in 1944, it reveals an author with a remarkable instinct for confessional narration.

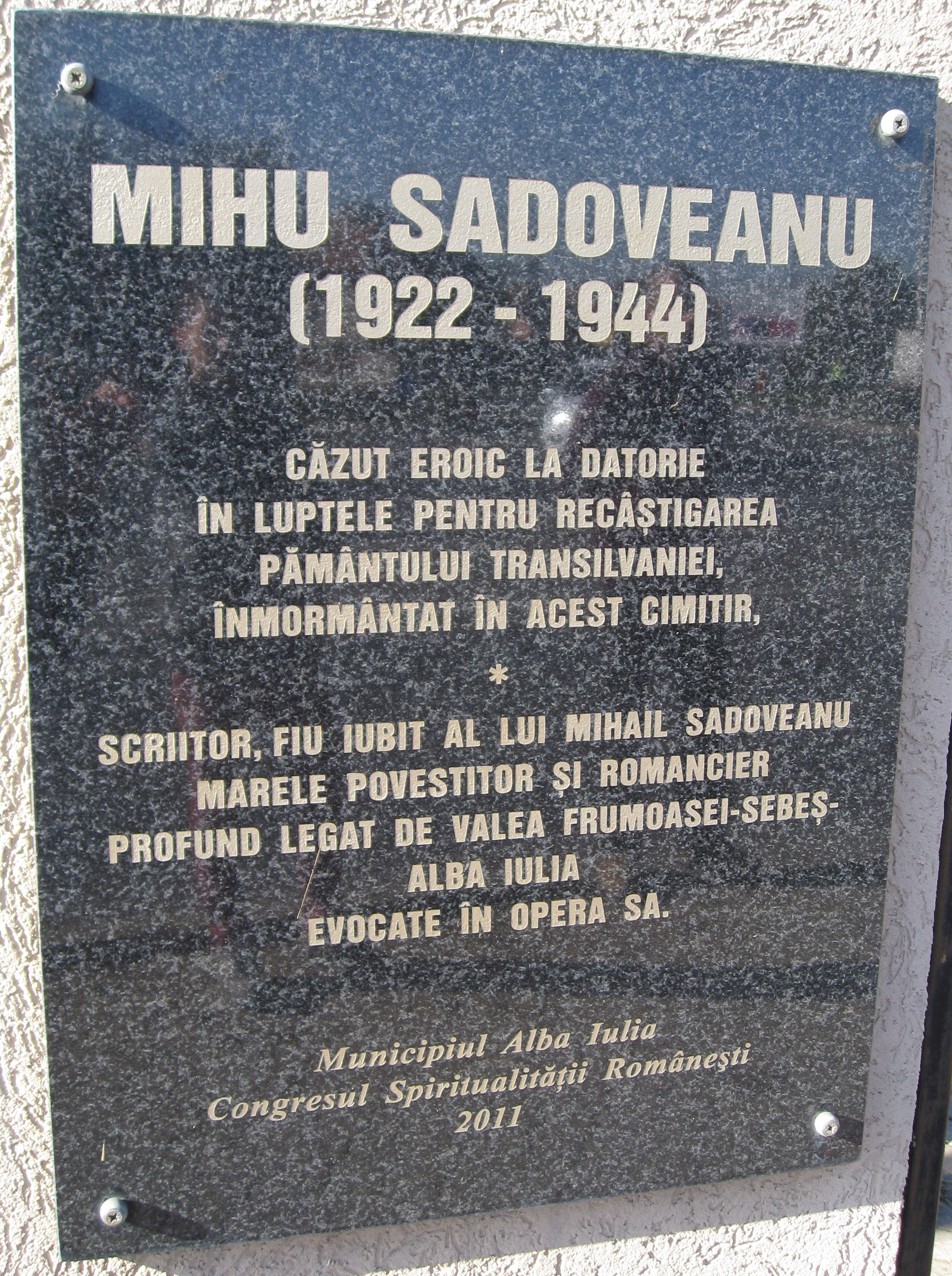
Memorial plaque outside the Alba Iulia heroes' cemetery

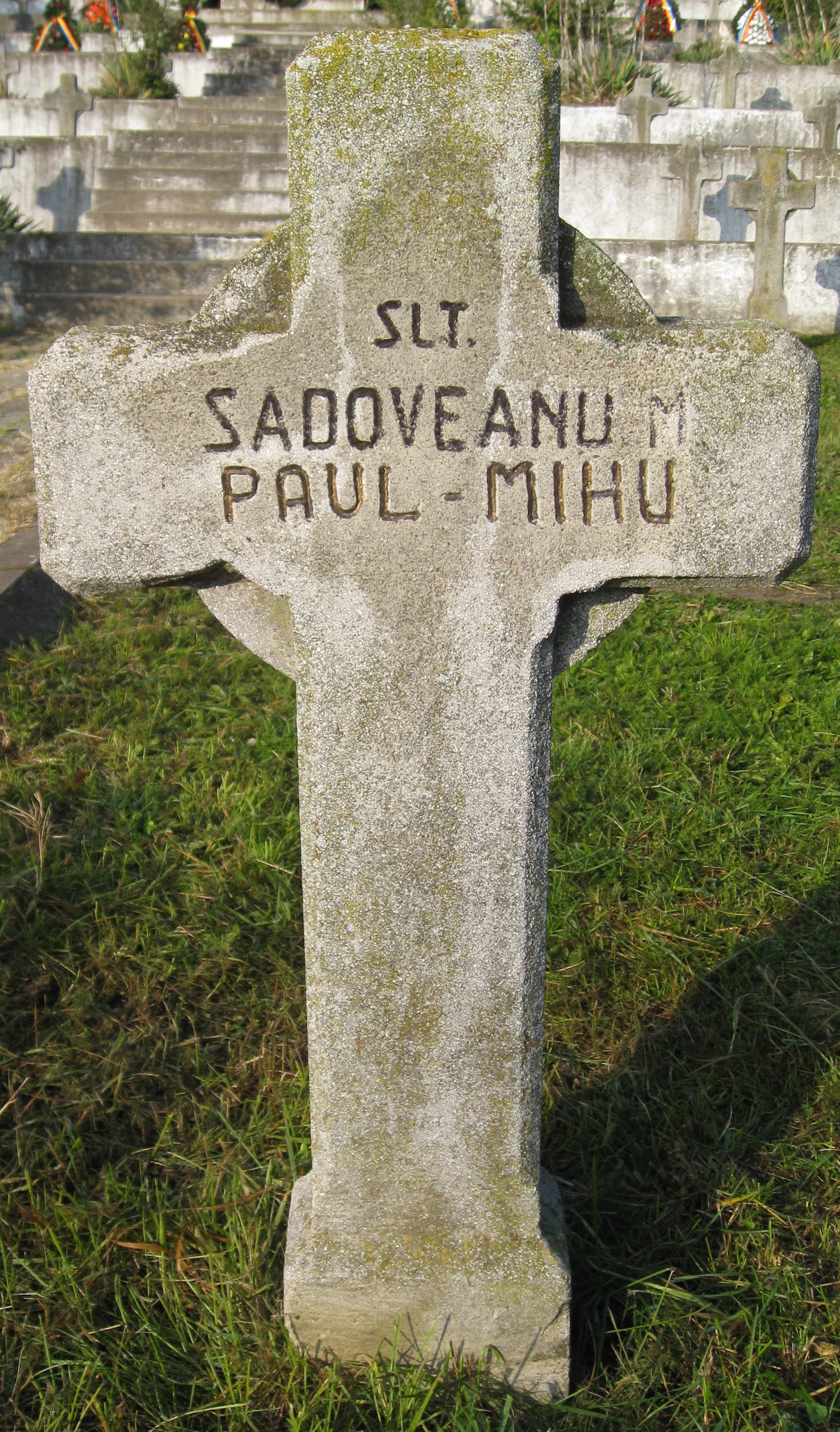
Grave inside the cemetery
