= Culture of Romania =

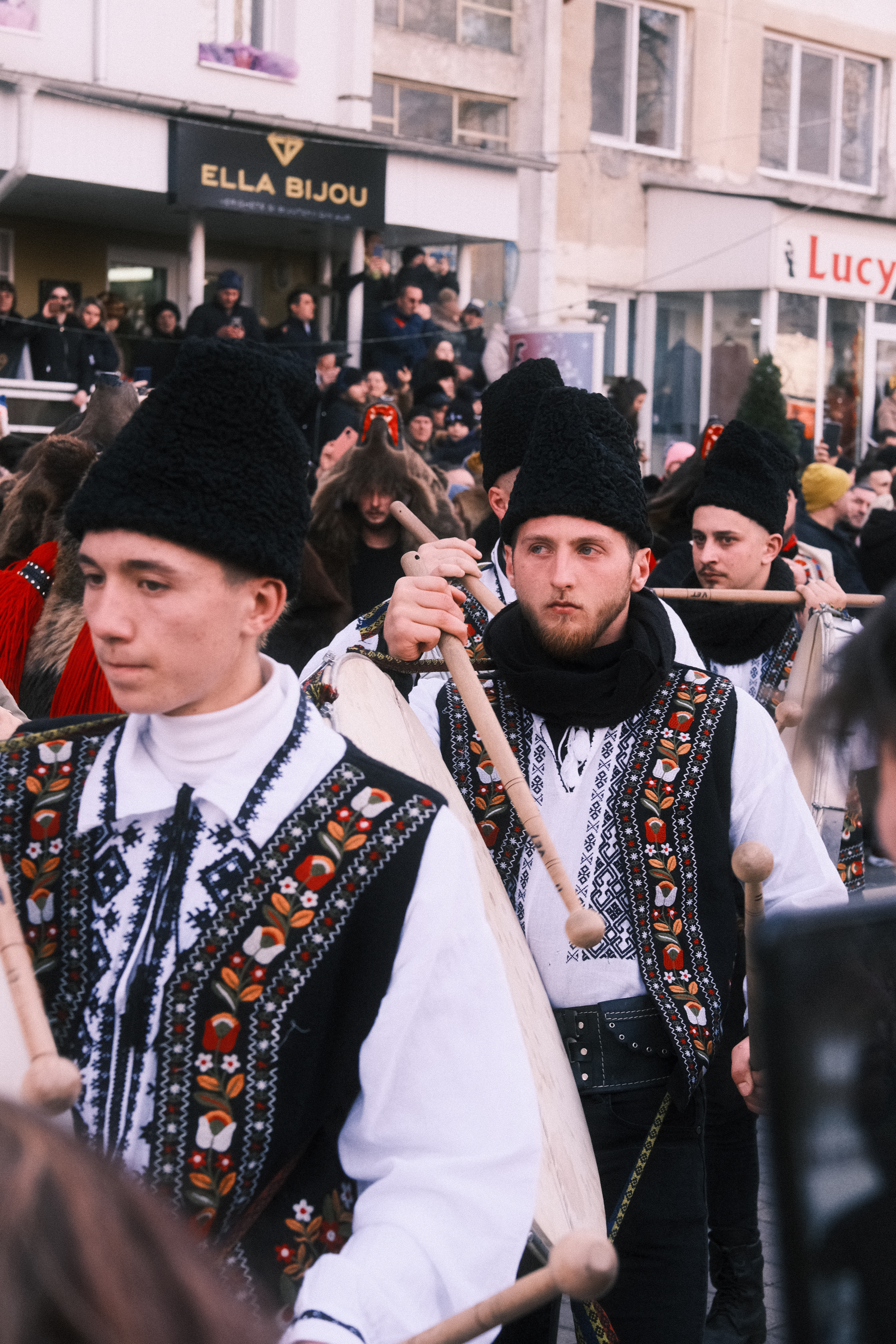
Romanian "tamburași" drummers in traditional clothing

The culture of Romania is an umbrella term used to encapsulate the ideas, customs and social behaviours of the people of Romania that developed due to the country's distinct geopolitical history and evolution. It is theorized that Romanians and related peoples (Aromanians, Megleno-Romanians, and Istro-Romanians) were formed through the admixture of the descendants of Roman colonists and the indigenous Daco-Thracian people who were subsequently Romanized.

== Background ==
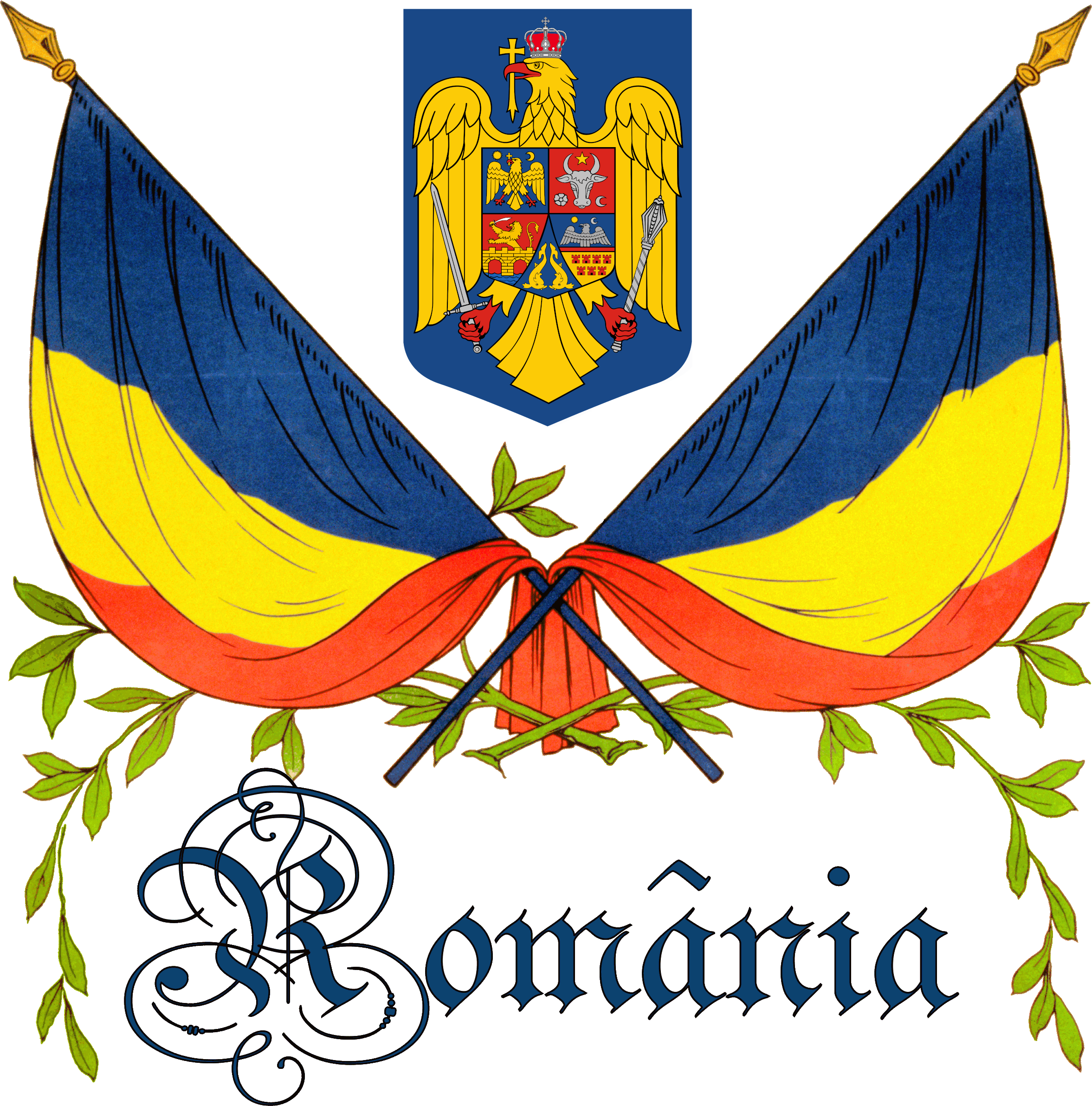
Illustration featuring the Romanian coat of arms and tricolor

Romania's history has been full of rebounds: the culturally productive epochs were those of stability when the people proved quite an impressive resourcefulness in the making up for less propitious periods and were able to rejoin the mainstream of European culture. This stands true for the years after the Phanariote-Ottoman period, at the beginning of the 19th century, when Romanians had a historical context and Romania started to become westernized, mainly with French influences, which they pursued steadily and at a very fast pace. From the end of the 18th century, the sons of the upper classes started having their education in Paris, and French became (and was until the communist years) a genuine second language of culture for Romanians.

The modeling role of France, especially in the fields of political ideas, administration, and law, as well as in literature, was paralleled, from the mid-19th century down to World War I, by German culture as well, which also triggered constant relationships with the German world not only at a cultural level but in daily life as well.

== History ==
=== Middle Ages ===
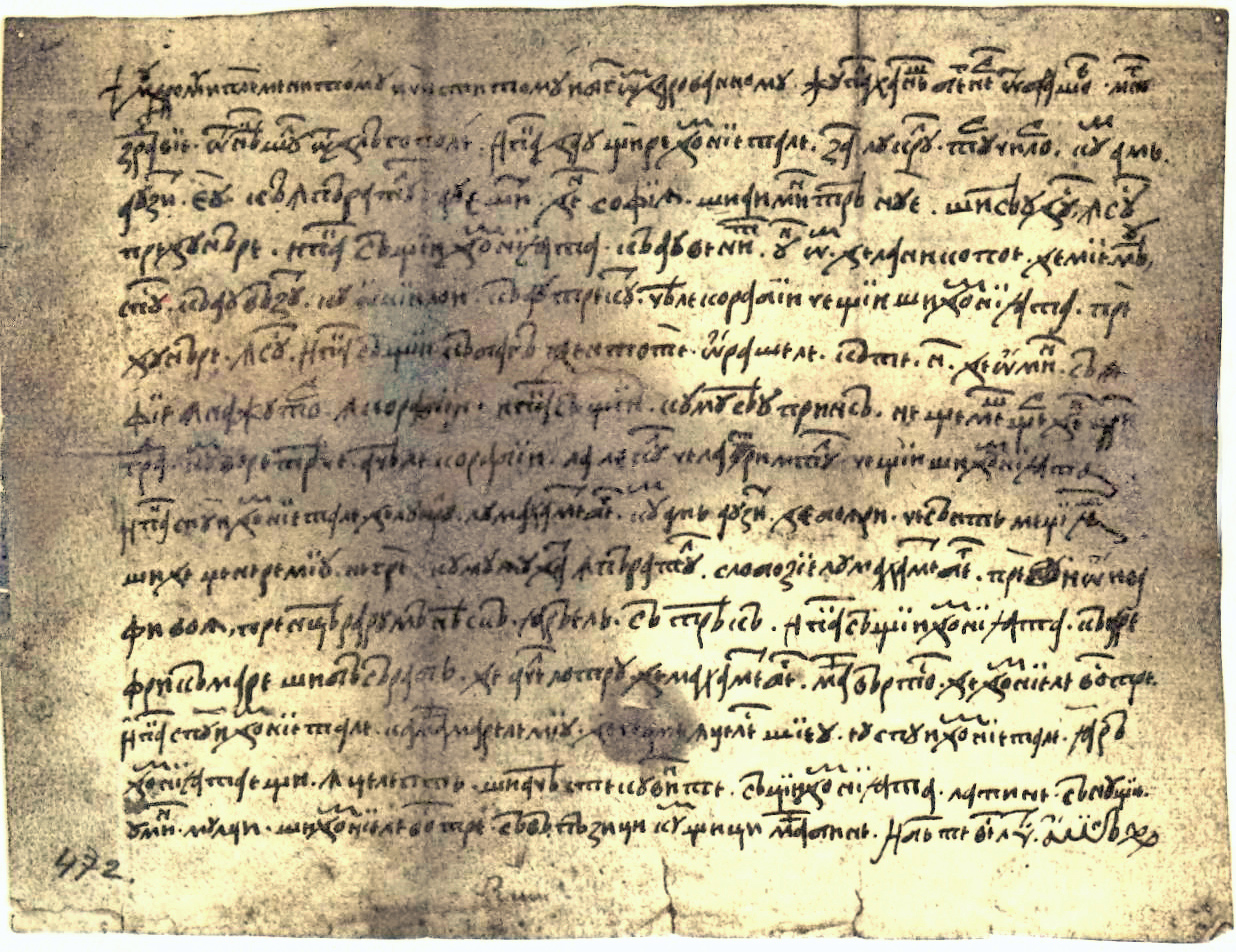
Neacșu's letter is the oldest surviving document written in Romanian.

Until the 14th century, small states (Romanian: voievodate) were spread across the territory of Transylvania, Wallachia, and Moldavia. The medieval principalities of Wallachia and Moldavia arose in the mid 1300s, in the areas south and east of the Carpathian Mountains respectively.

Moldavia and Wallachia were both situated on important commercial routes often crossed by Polish, Saxon, Greek, Armenian, Genovese, and Venetian merchants, connecting them well to the evolving culture of medieval Europe. Grigore Ureche's chronicle, Letopisețul Țărîi Moldovei (The Chronicles of the land of Moldavia), covering the period from 1359 to 1594, is a very important source of information about life, events, and personalities in Moldavia. It is among the first non-religious Romanian literary texts; due to its size and the information that it contains, it is arguably the most important Romanian document from the 17th century.

The first printed book, a prayer book in Slavonic, was produced in Wallachia in 1508, and the first book in Romanian, a catechism, was printed in Transylvania, in 1544. At the end of the 17th and the beginning of the 18th century, European humanism influenced the works of Miron Costin and Ion Neculce, the Moldavian chroniclers who continued Ureche's work. Constantin Brâncoveanu, prince of Wallachia, was a great patron of the arts and was a local Renaissance figure. During Șerban Cantacuzino's reign, the monks at the monastery of Snagov, near Bucharest, published in 1688 the first translated and printed Romanian Bible (Biblia de la București – The Bucharest Bible). The first successful attempts at written Romanian-language poetry were made in 1673 when Dosoftei, a Moldavian metropolitan in Iași, published a Romanian metrical psalter.

Dimitrie Cantemir, a Moldavian prince, was an important personality of the medieval period in Moldavia. His interests included philosophy, history, music, linguistics, ethnography, and geography. His most important works containing information about the Romanian regions were Descriptio Moldaviae, published in 1769, and Hronicul vechimii a romano-moldo-valahilor (roughly, Chronicle of the Antiquity of the Romano-Moldavo-Wallachians), the first critical history of Romania. His works were also known in western Europe, as he authored writings in Latin: Descriptio Moldaviae (commissioned by the Academy of Berlin, the member of which he became in 1714) and Incrementa atque decrementa aulae othomanicae, which was printed in English between 1734–1735 (second edition in 1756), in French in 1743 and in German in 1745; the latter was a major reference work in European science and culture up until the 19th century.

=== Classical Age ===
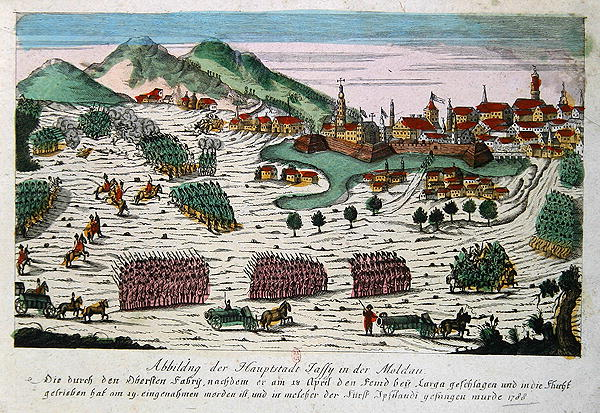
Iași (capital of Moldavia) at the end of the 18th century

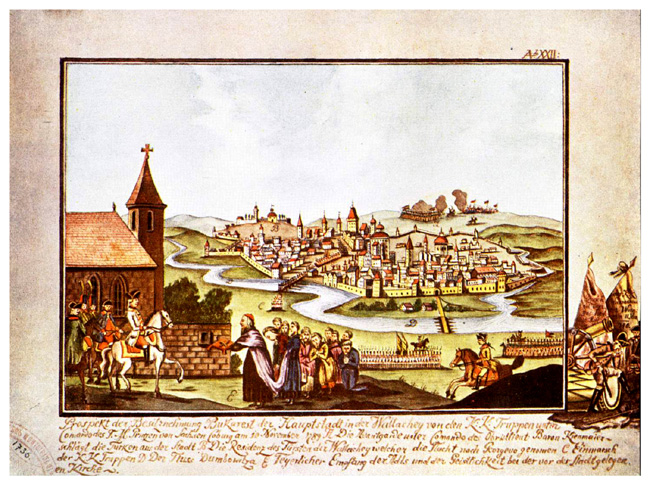
Bucharest (capital of Wallachia) at the end of the 18th century

In Transylvania, although they formed the majority of the population, Romanians were merely seen as a "tolerated nation" by the Austrian leadership of the province, and were not proportionally represented in political life and the Transylvanian Diet. At the end of the 18th century an emancipation movement known as the Transylvanian School (Școala Ardeleană) was formed, emphasizing the Roman element of the Romanian people, and making significant strides in the formation of a modern Latin-based Romanian alphabet (which eventually supplanted an earlier Cyrillic script). It formed following the Act of Union of 1698, which declared the full communion with the See of Rome of the Romanian Transylvanian church under Metropolitan Atanasie Anghel. Thus, the Romanian Greek-Catholic Church was formed, formalized by a synod of bishops on September 4, 1700. The links with Rome brought to the Romanian Transylvanians the ideas of the Age of Enlightenment. In 1791 the Transylvanian School issued a petition to Emperor Leopold II of Austria, named Supplex Libellus Valachorum based on the French Declaration of the Rights of Man and of the Citizen, demanding equal political rights with the other ethnicities for the Romanians in Transylvania. This movement, however, leaned more towards westernization in general, when in fact, the origin of the Romanian people is complex, intertwining elements from the peoples of the former Roman Empire with those of the ancient Dacians, and with the addition of 17th and 19th Eastern influences as emphasized through the Ottomans.

The period from 1711 to 1821 was marked in Wallachia and Moldavia by the reigns of appointed Phanariote Hospodars; thus, the two principalities were heavily influenced by the Ottoman and Greek world. Greek schools appeared in the principalities, and in 1818, the first Romanian School was founded in Bucharest by Gheorghe Lazăr and Ion Heliade Rădulescu. Figures such as Anton Pann, a successful novelist, emerged in that time, with Ienăchiță Văcărescu writing the first Romanian grammar, and his nephew Iancu Văcărescu becoming what is considered to be the first important Romanian poet. In 1821, an uprising in Wallachia took place against Phanariote rule. This uprising was led by the Romanian revolutionary and militia leader Tudor Vladimirescu, and would eventually lead to the restoration of Romanian princes on the thrones of the Danubian Principalities.

The revolutionary year 1848 had its echoes also in Wallachia, Moldavia and Transylvania, and a new elite had emerged from the revolutions represented by figures such as: Mihail Kogălniceanu (writer, politician, and the first prime minister of Romania), Vasile Alecsandri (politician, playwright, and poet), Andrei Mureșanu (publicist and the writer of the current Romanian National Anthem) and Nicolae Bălcescu (historian, writer and revolutionary).

The union between Moldavia and Wallachia in 1859 brought a growing consolidation of Romanian life and culture. Universities were opened in Iași and in Bucharest, and the number of new cultural establishments grew significantly. The new prince from 1866 and then King of Romania, Carol I, was a devoted king, and he and his wife Elisabeth were among the main patrons of arts. Of great impact in Romanian literature was the literary society Junimea, founded in 1863 by the circle of literary critic Titu Maiorescu. It published its cultural journal Convorbiri Literare where, among others, Mihai Eminescu, Romania's greatest poet, Ion Creangă, a storyteller of genius, and Ion Luca Caragiale, novelist and Romania's greatest playwright, published most of their groundbreaking works. During the same period, Nicolae Grigorescu and Ștefan Luchian founded modern Romanian painting; celebrated composer Ciprian Porumbescu was also from this time.

In Transylvania, the emancipation movement became better organized, and in 1861, an important cultural organization by the name of ASTRA (The Transylvanian Association for Romanian Literature and the Culture of the Romanian People) was founded in Sibiu under the close supervision of the Romanian Orthodox Metropolitan Andrei Șaguna. It helped publish a great number of Romanian language books and newspapers, and between 1898 and 1904, it published a Romanian Encyclopedia. Among the greatest personalities from this period are the novelist and publicist Ioan Slavici, the prose writer Panait Istrati, the poet and writer Barbu Ștefănescu Delavrancea, the poet and publicist George Coșbuc, the poet Ștefan Octavian Iosif, the historian and founder of Romanian press in Transylvania George Barițiu and Badea Cârțan, a simple peasant shepherd from Southern Transylvania who, through his actions became a symbol of the emancipation movement.

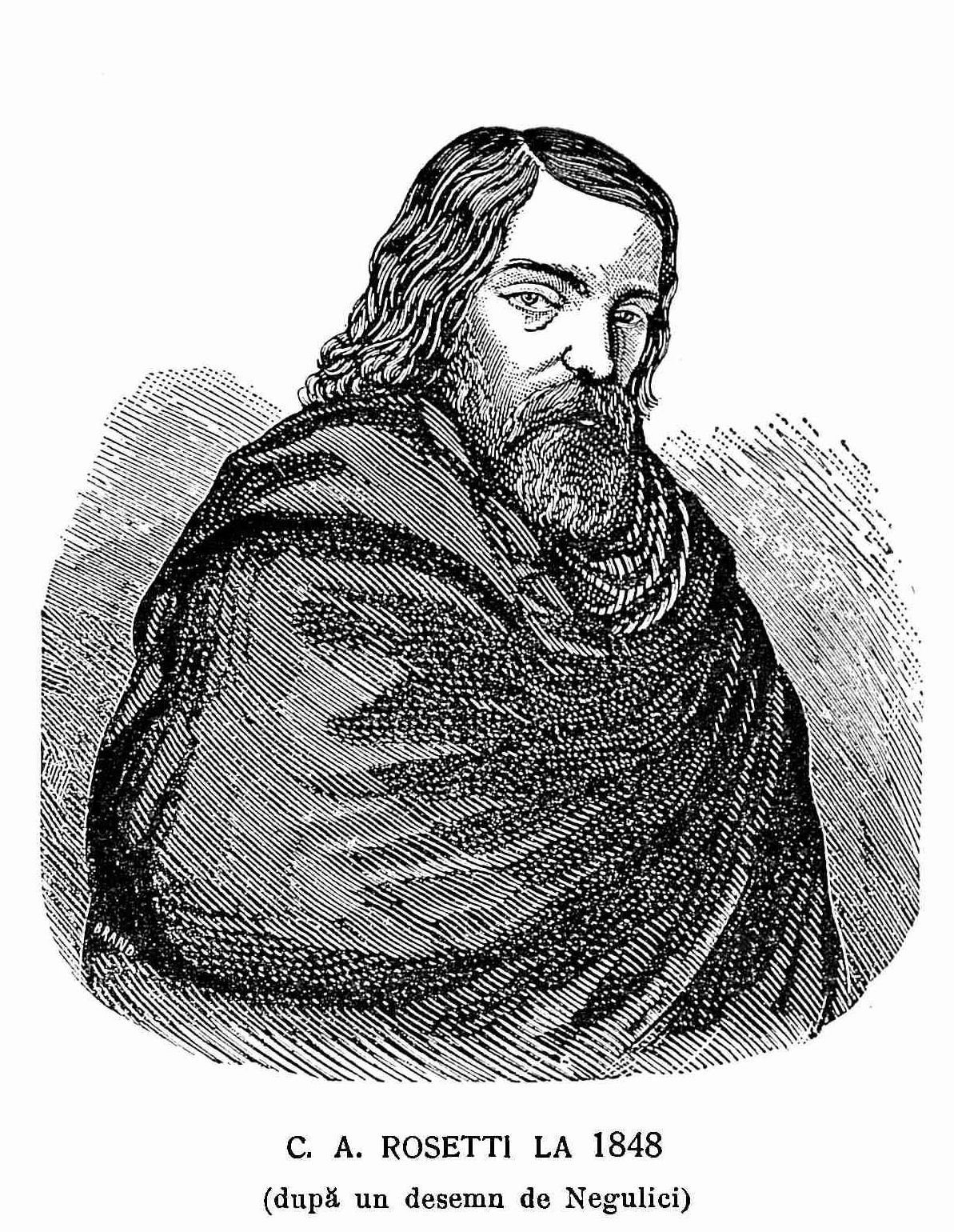
C.A. Rosetti

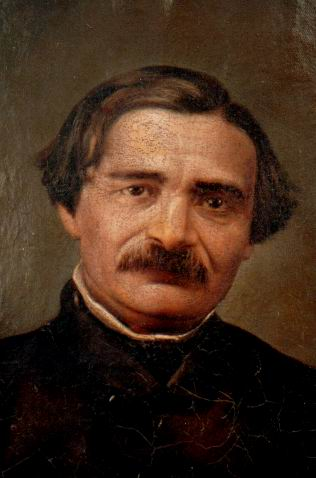
Ion Heliade Rădulescu

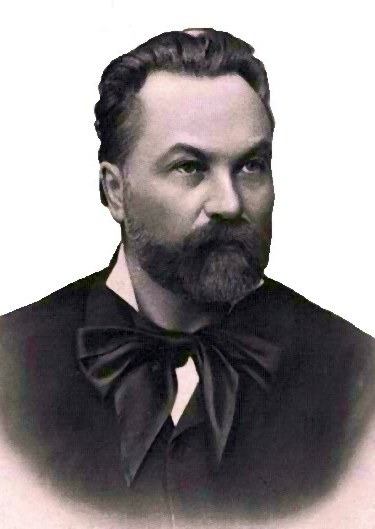
Calistrat Hogaș

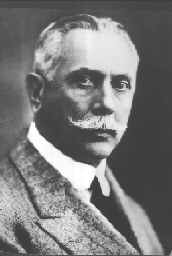
Duiliu Zamfirescu

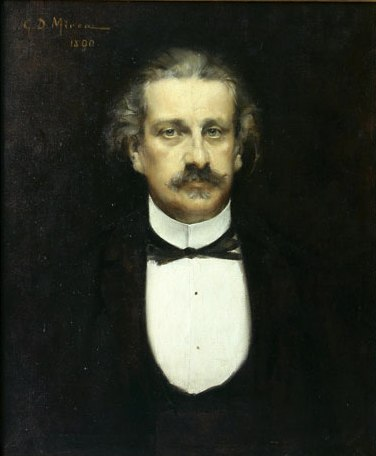
Alexandru Odobescu

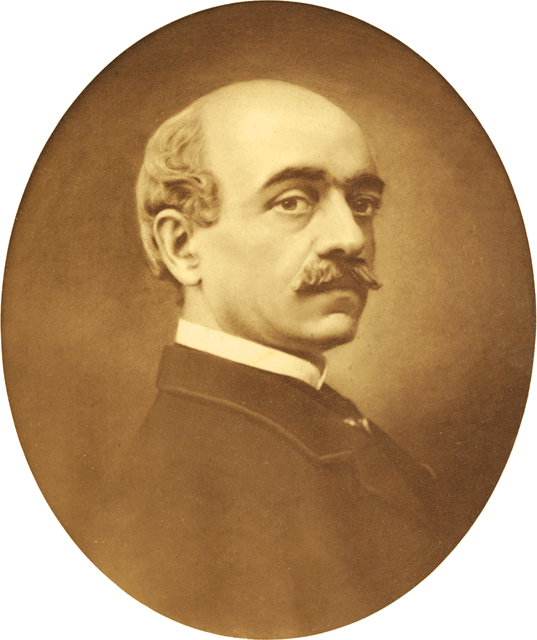
Vasile Alecsandri

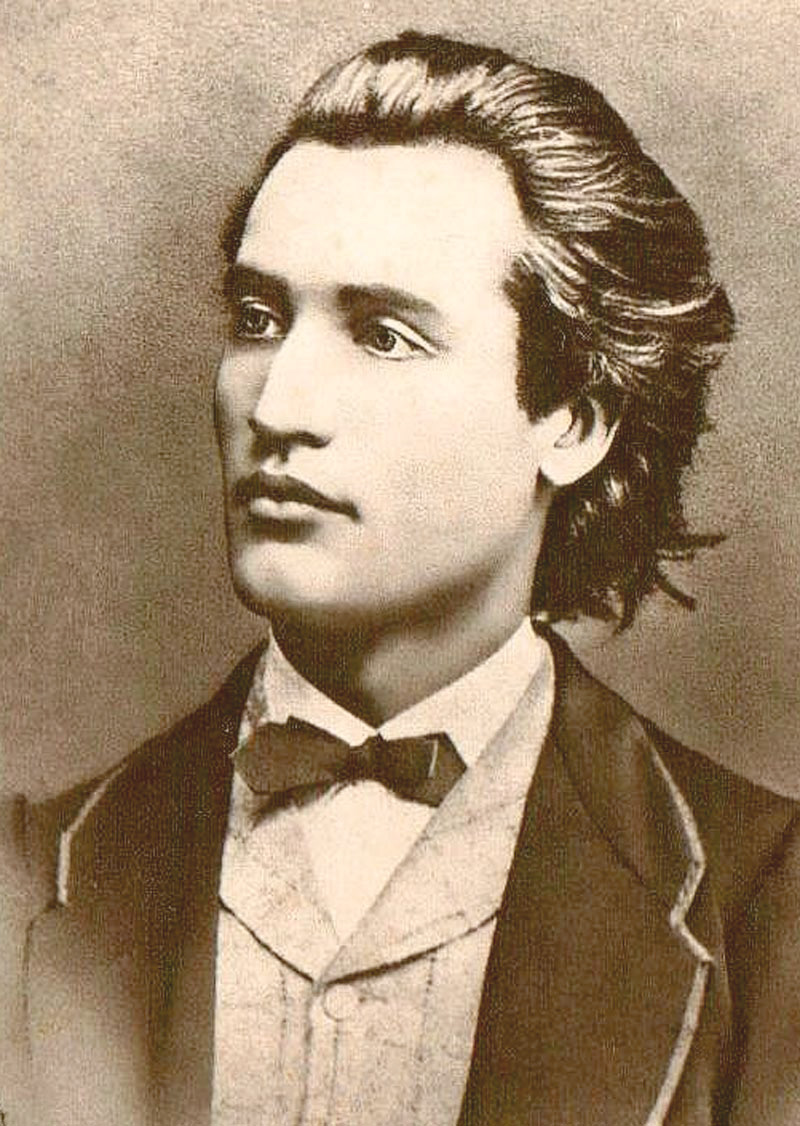
Mihai Eminescu, national poet of Romania and Moldova

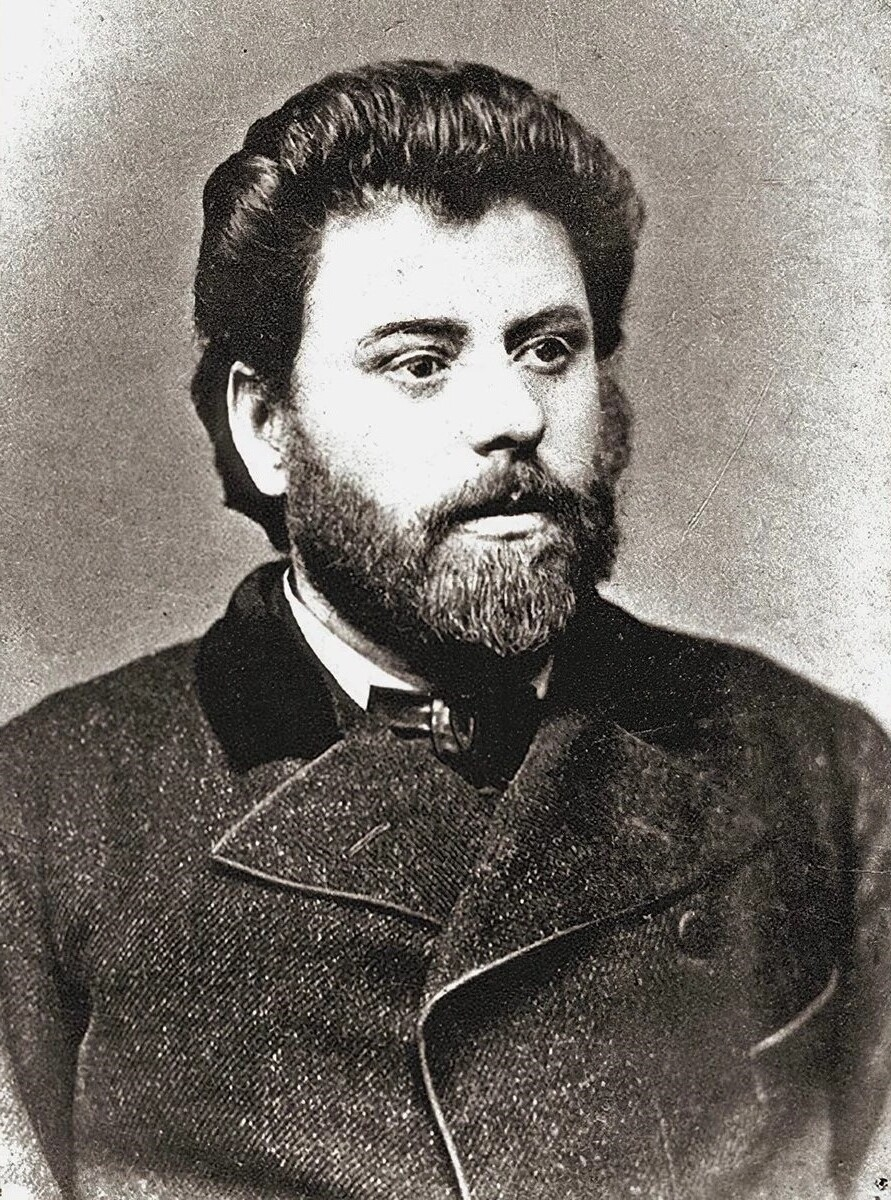
Ion Creangă

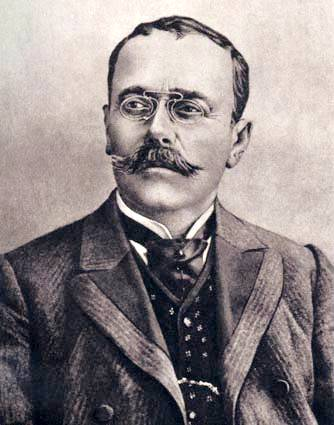
Ion Luca Caragiale

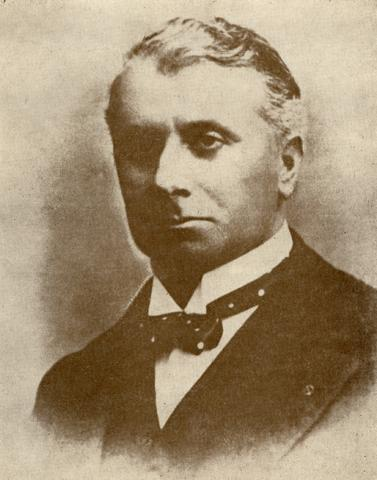
Mateiu Caragiale

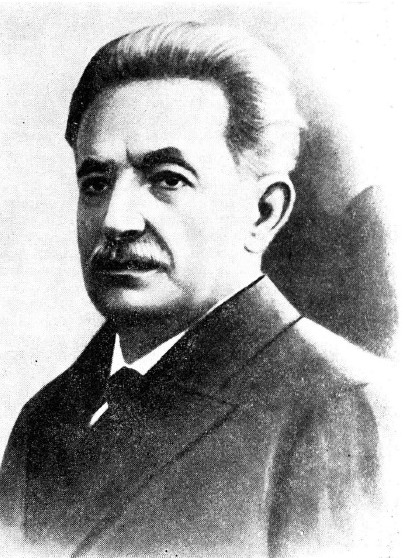
Ioan Slavici

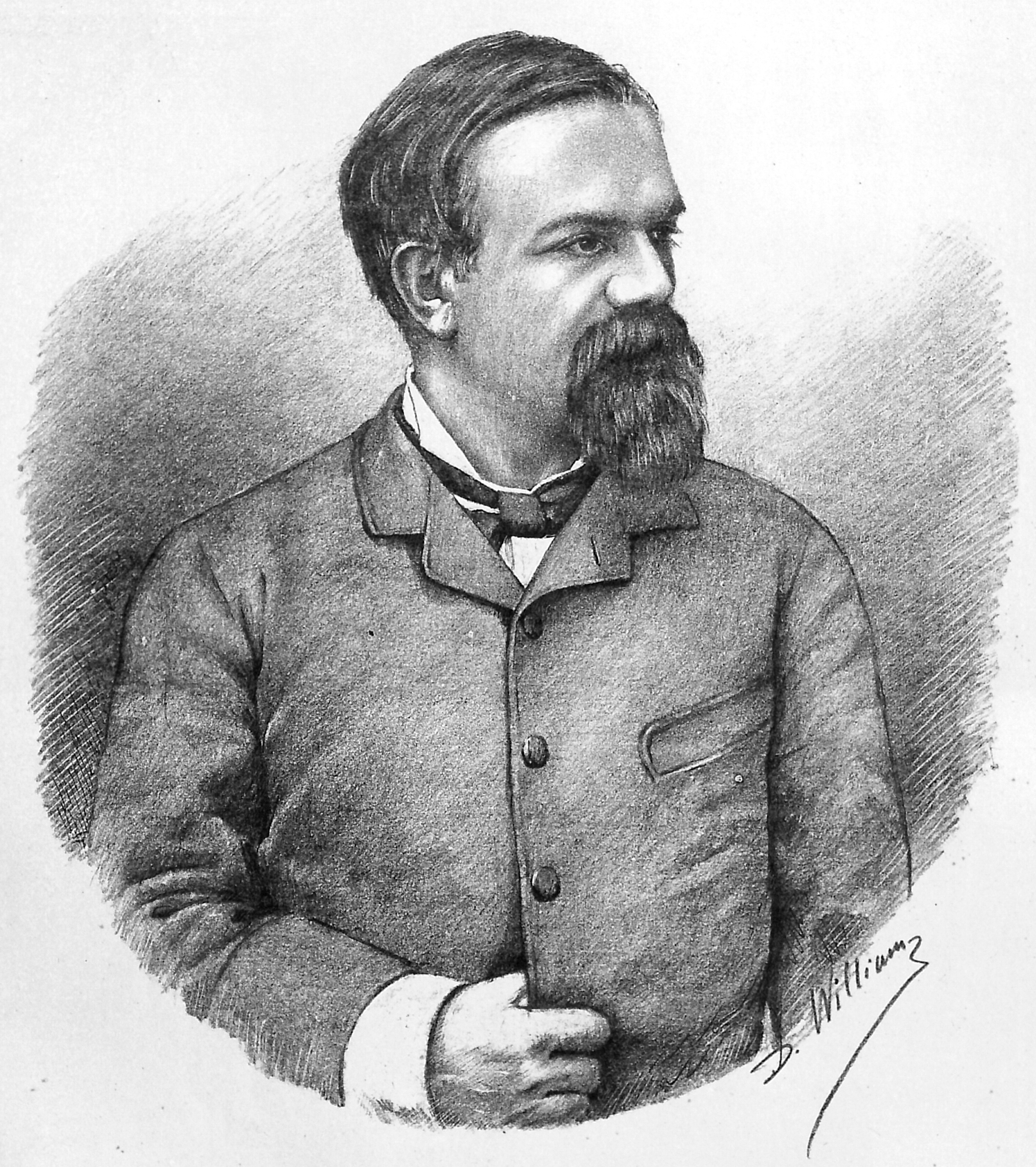
Titu Maiorescu

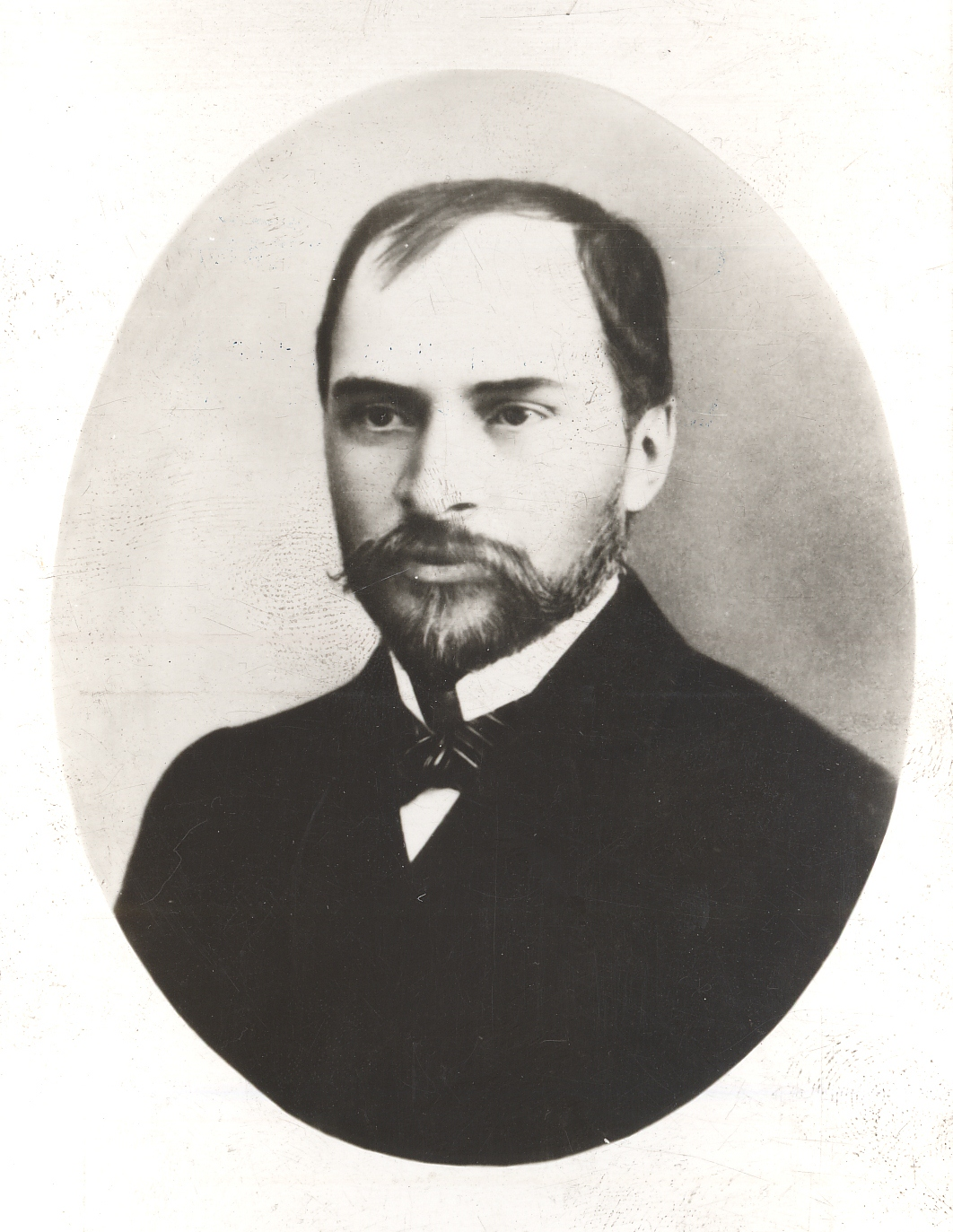
George Coșbuc

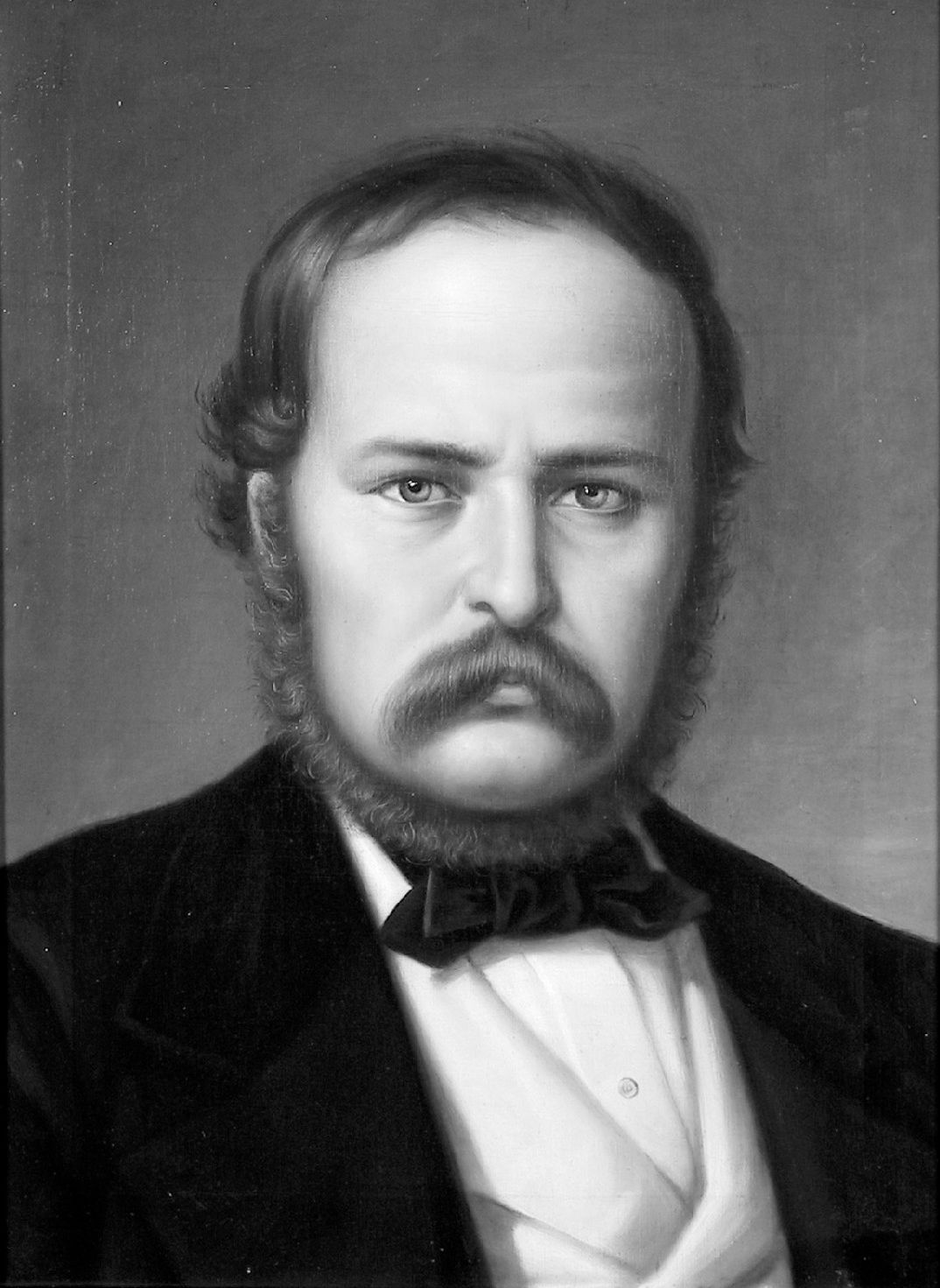
Andrei Mureșanu

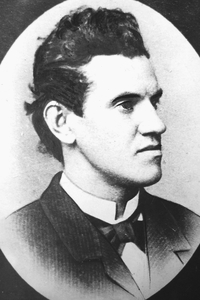
Ciprian Porumbescu

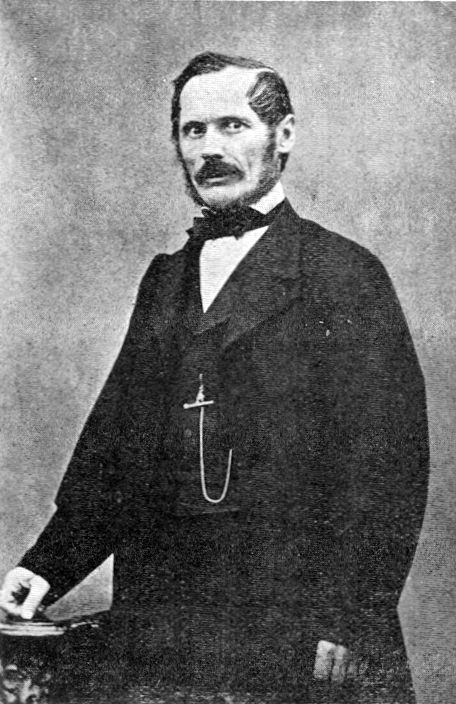
George Barițiu

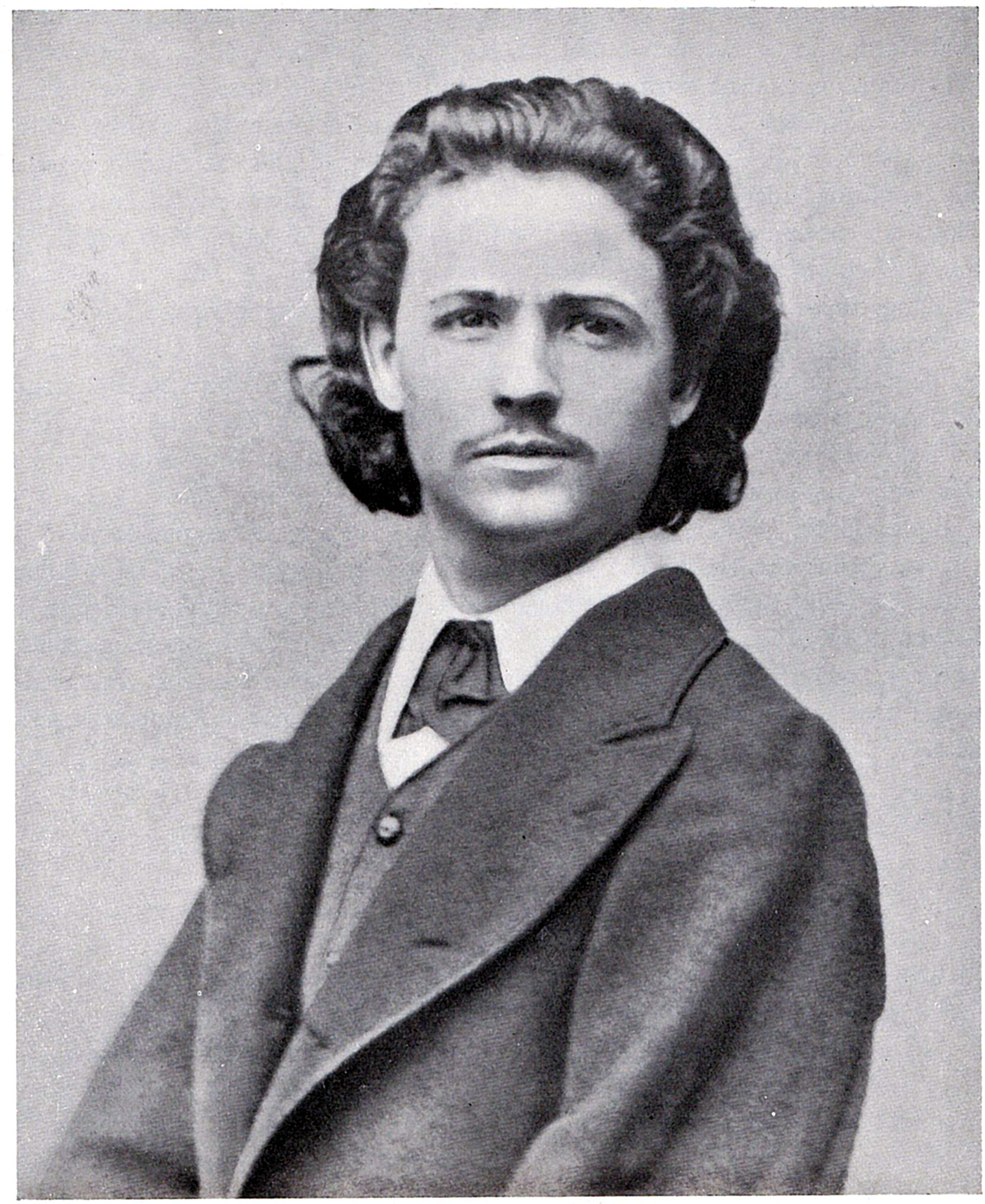
Nicolae Grigorescu

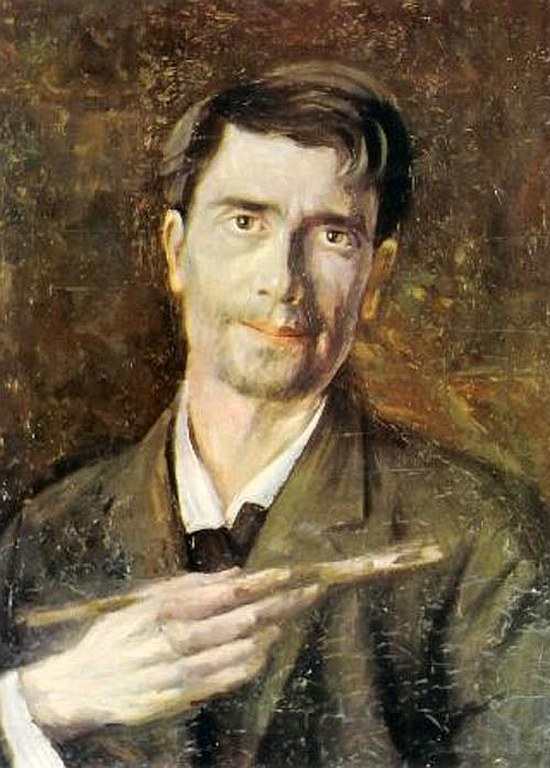
Ștefan Luchian

=== Golden Age ===
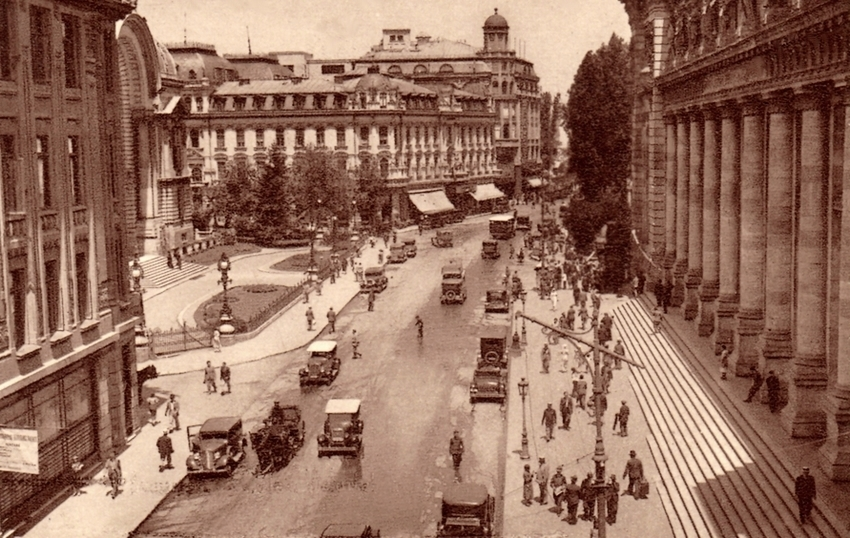
Victory Avenue in Bucharest, 1940

The first half of the 20th century is regarded by many as the golden age of Romanian culture, and it is the period when it reached its main level of international affirmation and a strong connection to European cultural trends. The most important artist who had a great influence on the world culture was the sculptor Constantin Brâncuși (1876–1957), a central figure of the modern movement and a pioneer of abstraction, an innovator of world sculpture by immersion in the primordial sources of folk creation.

The relationship between traditional and Western European trends was a subject of heated polemics, and outstanding personalities sustained the debates. The playwright, expressionist poet, and philosopher Lucian Blaga can be cited as a member of the traditionalist group and the literary critic founder of the literary circle and cultural journal Sburătorul, Eugen Lovinescu, represents the so-called Westernizing group, which sought to bring Romanian culture closer to Western European culture. Also, George Călinescu was a more complex writer who, among different literary creations, produced the monumental "History of the Romanian literature, from its origins till present day".

The beginning of the 20th century was also a prolific period for Romanian prose, with personalities such as the novelist Liviu Rebreanu, who described the struggles in the traditional society and the horrors of war, Mihail Sadoveanu, a writer of novels of epic proportions with inspiration from the medieval history of Moldavia, and Camil Petrescu, a more modern writer distinguishing himself through his analytical prose writing. In dramaturgy, Mihail Sebastian was an influential writer, and as the number of theaters grew, also did the number of actors, Lucia Sturdza Bulandra being an actress representative of this period.

Alongside the prominent poet George Topîrceanu, a poet of equal importance was Tudor Arghezi, who was the first to revolutionize poetry in the last 50 years. One should not neglect the poems of George Bacovia, a symbolist poet of neurosis, and despair and those of Ion Barbu, a brilliant mathematician who wrote a series of very successful cryptic poems. Tristan Tzara and Marcel Janco, founders of the Dadaist movement, were also of Romanian origin.

Also during the golden age came the epoch of Romanian philosophy with such figures as Mircea Vulcănescu, Dimitrie Gusti, Alexandru Dragomir, and Vasile Conta. The period was dominated by the overwhelming personality of the historian and politician Nicolae Iorga, who, during his lifetime, published over 1,250 books and wrote more than 25,000 articles. In music, the composers George Enescu and Constantin Dimitrescu and the pianist Dinu Lipatti became world-famous. The number of important Romanian painters also grew, and the most significant ones were: Nicolae Tonitza, Camil Ressu, Francisc Șirato, Ignat Bednarik, Lucian Grigorescu, and Theodor Pallady. In medicine, a great contribution to human society was the discovery of insulin by the Romanian scientist Nicolae Paulescu. Gheorghe Marinescu was an important neurologist and Victor Babeș was one of the earliest bacteriologists. In mathematics, Gheorghe Țițeica was one of Romania's greatest mathematicians, and also an important personality was the mathematician/poet Dan Barbilian.

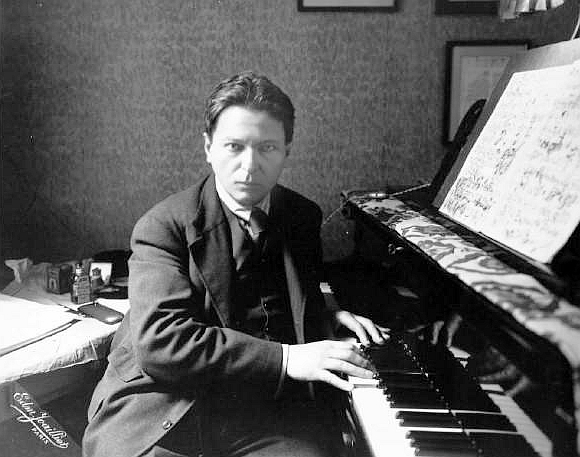
George Enescu

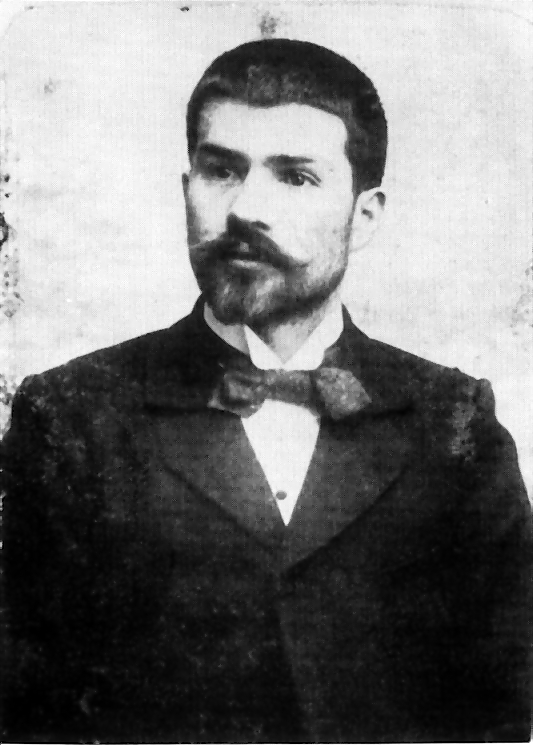
Constantin Brâncuși

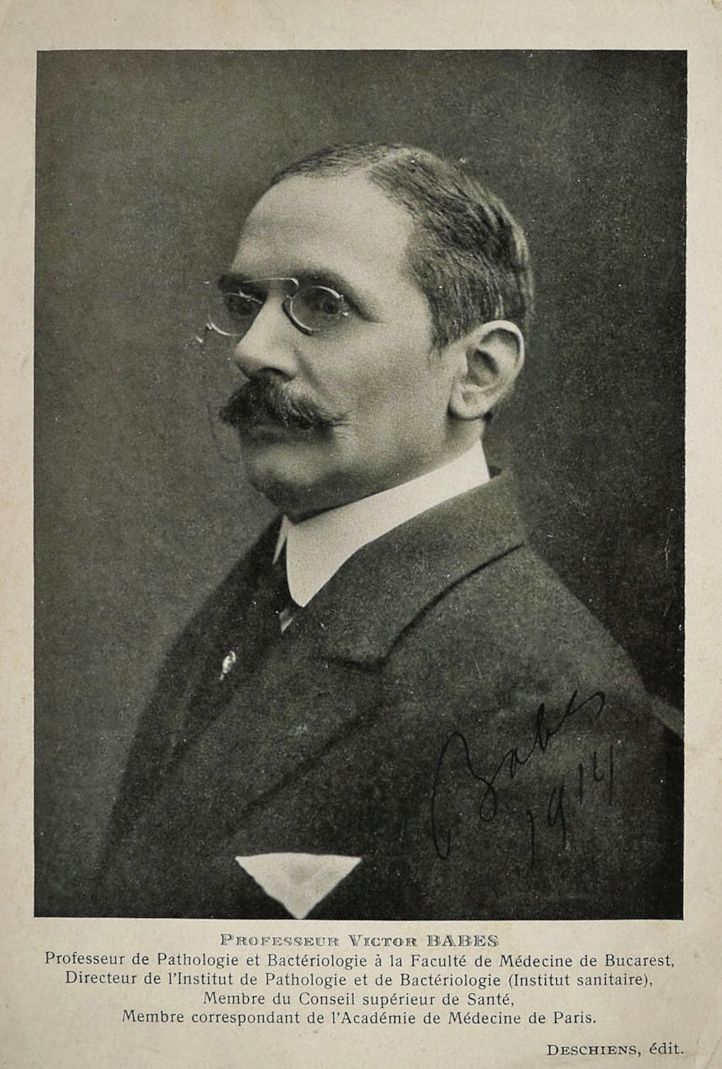
Victor Babeș

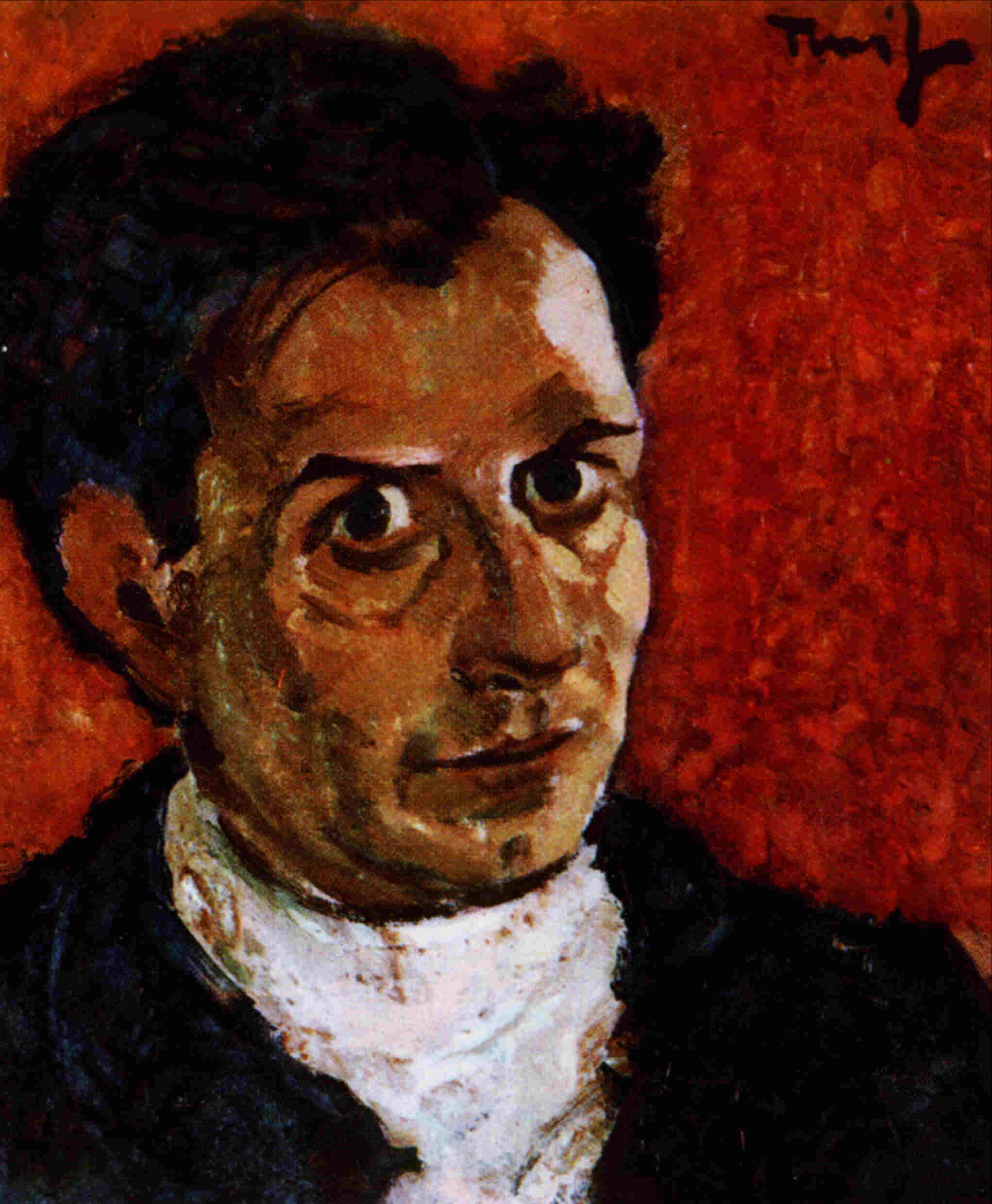
Nicolae Tonitza

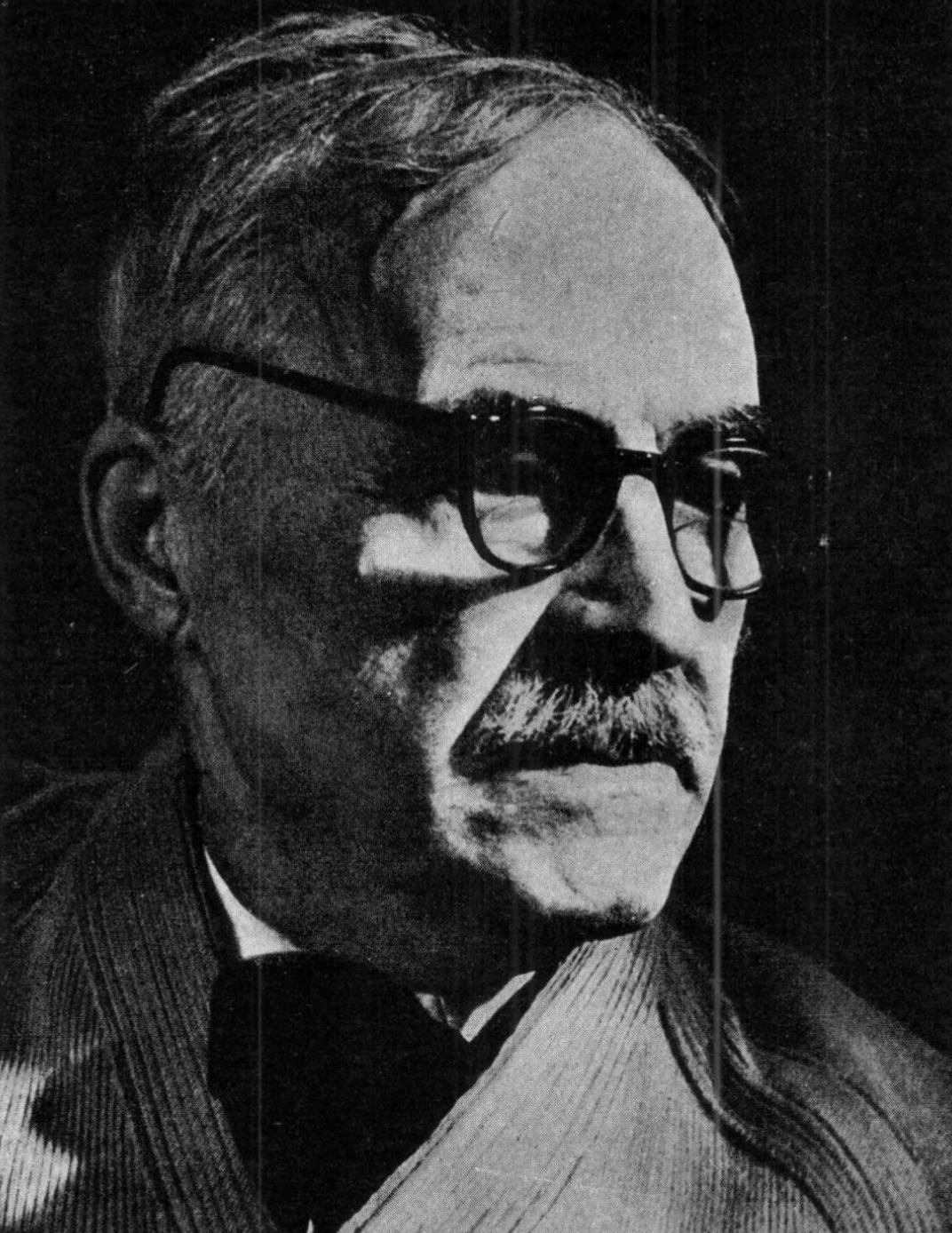
Tudor Arghezi

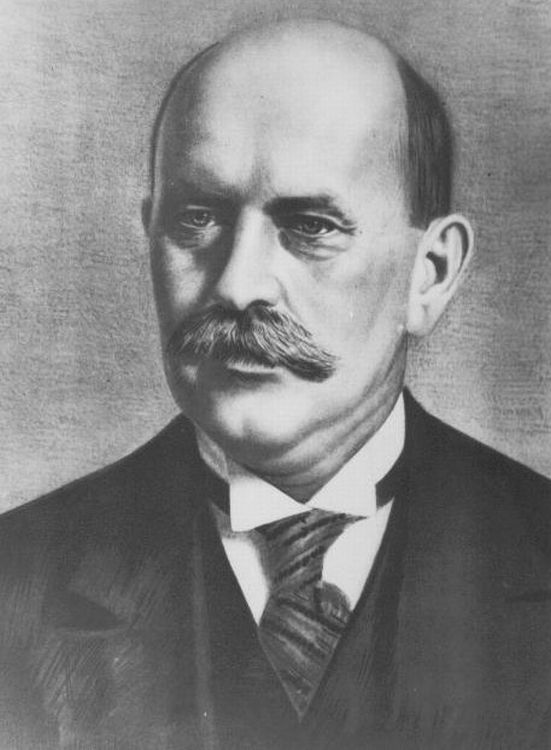
Gheorghe Țițeica

=== Post-war period ===
In Romania, the communist regime imposed heavy censorship on almost all elements of life, and they used the cultural world as a means to better control the population. The freedom of expression was constantly restricted in various ways: the Sovietization period was an attempt at building up a new cultural identity on the basis of socialist realism and lending legitimacy to the new order by rejecting traditional values. Two currents appeared: one that glorified the regime and another that tried to avoid censorship. The first is probably of no lasting cultural value, but the second managed to create valuable works, successfully avoiding censorship and being very well received by the general public. From this period, the most outstanding personalities are those of the writer Marin Preda, the poets Nichita Stănescu and Marin Sorescu, and the literary critics Nicolae Manolescu and Eugen Simion. Most dissidents who chose not to emigrate lived a life closely watched by the regime, either in "house arrest" or in "forced domicile"; some chose to retreat to remote monasteries. Most of their work was published after the 1989 Revolution. Among the most notable examples are the philosophers Constantin Noica, Petre Țuțea, and Nicolae Steinhardt.

There was a chasm between the official, communist culture and genuine culture. On the one hand, against the authorities' intentions, the outstanding works were perceived as a realm of moral truths, and the significant representatives of genuine cultural achievement were held in very high esteem by the public opinion. On the other hand, the slogans disseminated nationwide through the forms of official culture helped spread simplistic views, which were relatively successful among some ranks of the population. The tension between these two directions can still be perceived at the level of society as a whole.

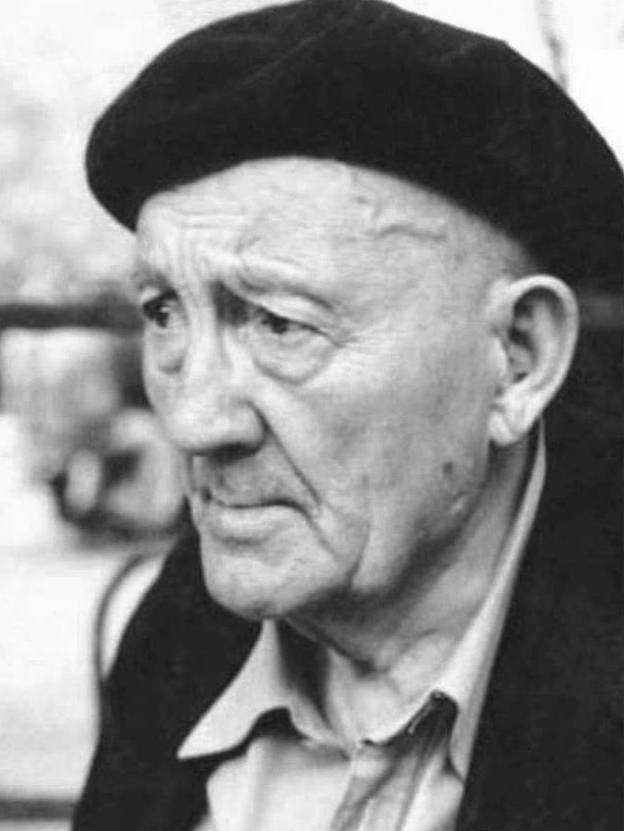
Petre Țuțea

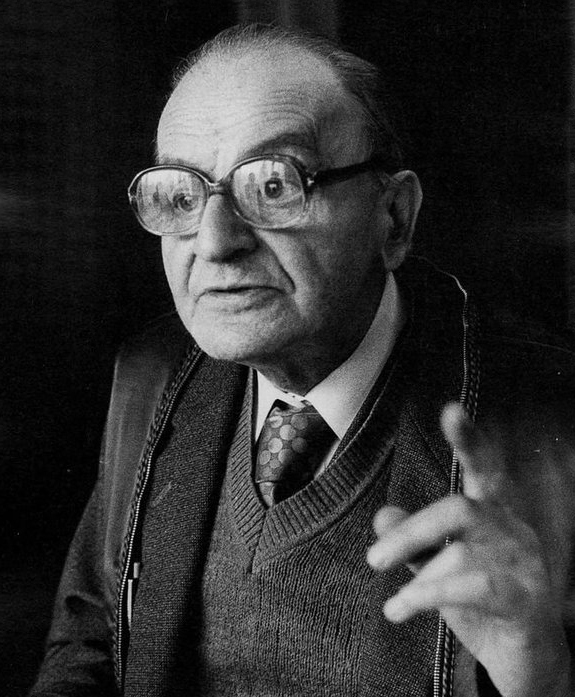
Constantin Noica

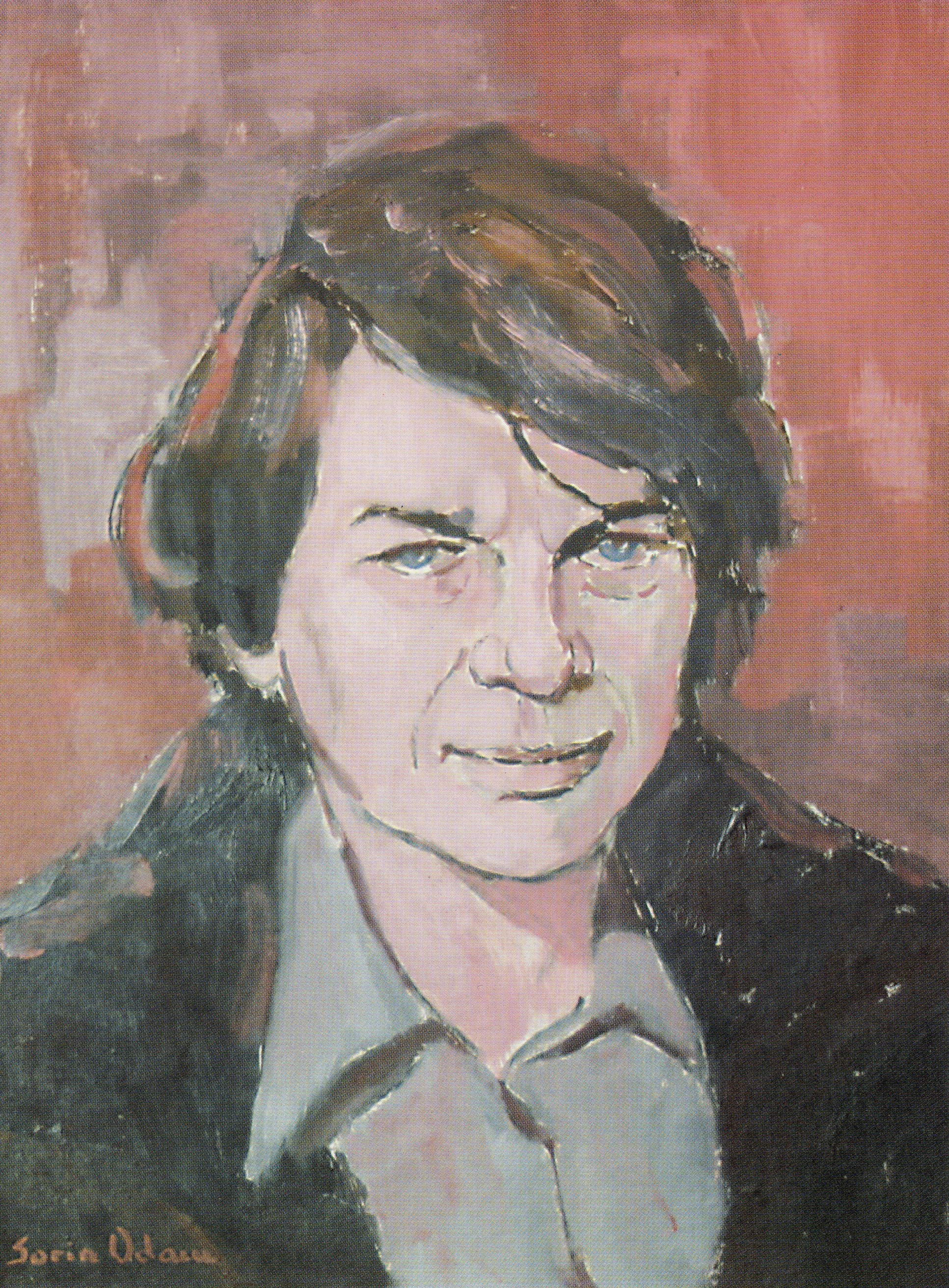
Nichita Stănescu

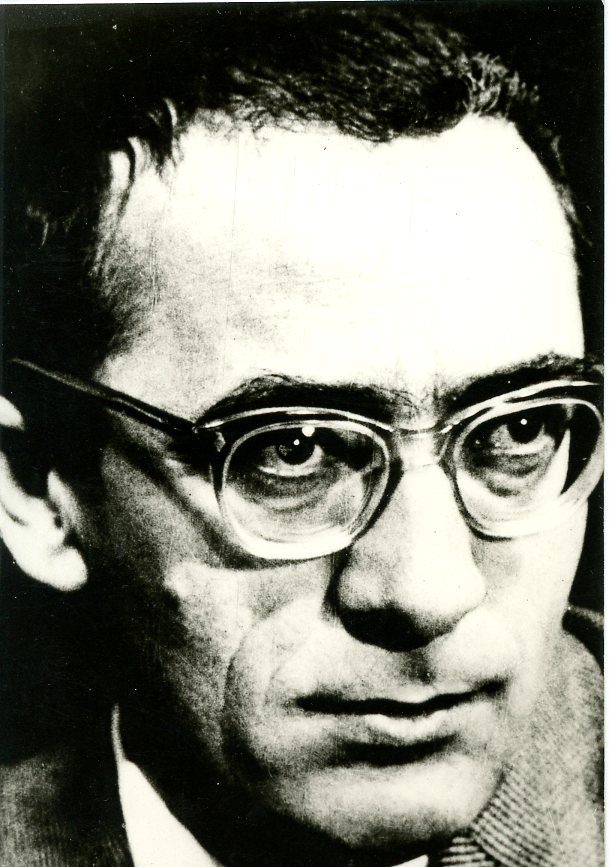
Marin Preda

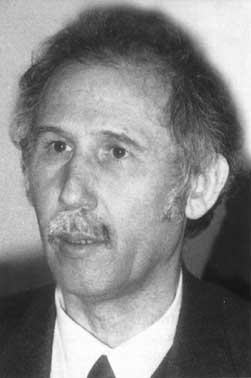
Marin Sorescu

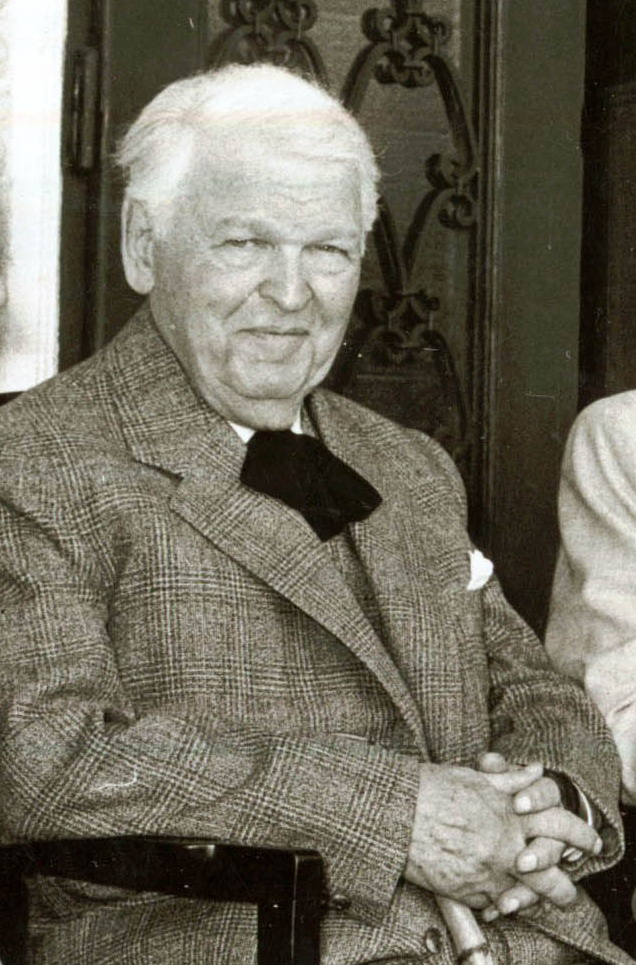
Mihail Sadoveanu

==== Culture inside communist Romania ====
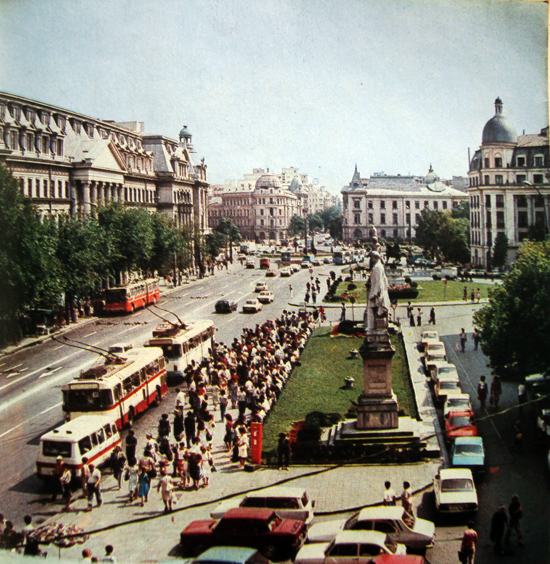
University Square in Bucharest during Communism

A strong editorial activity took place during the Communist regime. With the purpose of educating the large masses of peoples, a huge number of books were published. Large-scale editing houses such as Cartea Românească, Editura Eminescu, and others appeared, which published huge collections of books, such as the Biblioteca pentru Toţi ("The Library for Everyone") with over 5,000 titles. Generally, a book was never published in an edition of less than 50,000 copies. Libraries appeared in every village, and almost all were kept up to date with the newest books published. Also, due to low prices, almost everyone could afford to have their own collection of books at home. The negative part was that all the books were heavily censored. Also, due to rationing in every aspect of life, the quality of the printing and the paper also was very low, and the books, therefore, degraded easily.

During this period, there was a significant increase in the number of theatres, as they appeared even in the smallest towns. Many new establishments were built, and in the big cities they became important landmarks, such as the building of the National Theatre of Bucharest, situated right in the middle of the city, immediately adjacent to Romania's kilometre zero. In the smaller towns, there existed the so-called "Worker's Theatre", a semi-professional institution. Partly due to the lack of other entertainment venues, the theatre was highly popular, and the number of actors increased. All of the theatres had a stable, state-funded budget. Again, however, the drawback was the heavy control imposed on them by the regime: censorship was ever-present, and only ideologically-accepted plays were allowed. More progressive theatres managed to survive in some remote cities that became favorite destinations for young actors, but they generally had only a local audience.

Cinemas evolved the same way as the theatres; sometimes, the same establishment served both purposes. Movies were very popular, and from the 1960s, foreign films started becoming quite widespread. Western films, when shown, were heavily censored: entire sections were cut, and dialogue was translated only using ideologically accepted words. Domestic or "friendly" foreign productions constituted the bulk of films in cinemas. During this period, cinematography started to develop in Romania, and the first successful short films were made based on Caragiale's plays. Financed by the government, during the 1960s, a whole industry developed at Buftea, a town close to Bucharest, and some films, especially gangster, Western-genre, and historical movies, were very well received by the public. The most prolific director was Sergiu Nicolaescu, and probably the most-acclaimed actor from that period was Amza Pellea.

==== Romanians in exile ====
A consequence of the communist attitude towards the bourgeoisie elites in general, was the creation, for the first time in Romania's history, of a diaspora. Three individuals emerged as the most important Romanians abroad: playwright Eugen Ionescu (1909–1994) (who became known in France as Eugène Ionesco), creator of the Theatre of the Absurd and eventual member of the Académie française; religious historian and writer Mircea Eliade (1907–1986); and the essayist and philosopher Emil Cioran (1911–1995), the greatest French-writing master of style after Pascal. Fellow Romanian Ioan Petre Culianu continued Eliade's work with great success, in the United States. Another member of the diaspora who distinguished himself was the philosopher and logician Stephane Lupasco. The communist rule in Romania, unlike most of the other countries of the Eastern bloc, permanently repudiated the Romanians who had left their country and labeled them as traitors to the Fatherland. So, neither Mircea Eliade, nor Eugène Ionesco, nor Emil Cioran, whose works would be published in this country sporadically after 1960, could see their native land again. It was only after 1989 that the process of regaining the values of the diaspora and of reintegrating its personalities into this country's culture could be started seriously, a process marked in its turn by tension and disagreements.

Well-known Romanian musicians outside of Romania during this period include conductors Sergiu Celibidache—the main conductor at the Berlin Philharmonic Orchestra and later of Munich Philharmonic Orchestra—and Constantin Silvestri, main conductor at the Bournemouth Symphony Orchestra. Gheorghe Zamfir was a virtuoso of the pan pipes and made this instrument known to a modern worldwide audience, and was also a composer or interpreter for a great number of movies. Composer and architect Iannis Xenakis was born in Romania and spent his childhood there.

George Emil Palade, a cell biologist and a teacher, became the first Romanian to receive the Nobel Prize, winning the 1974 Nobel Prize in Physiology or Medicine for describing the structure and function of organelles in cells. Elie Wiesel, who received the Nobel Peace Prize in 1986, was born in the Romanian town of Sighetu Marmaţiei.

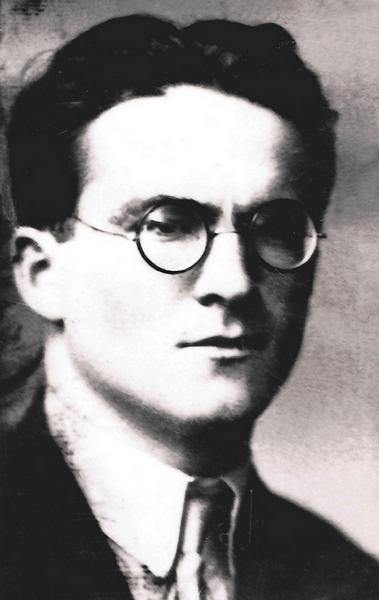
Mircea Eliade

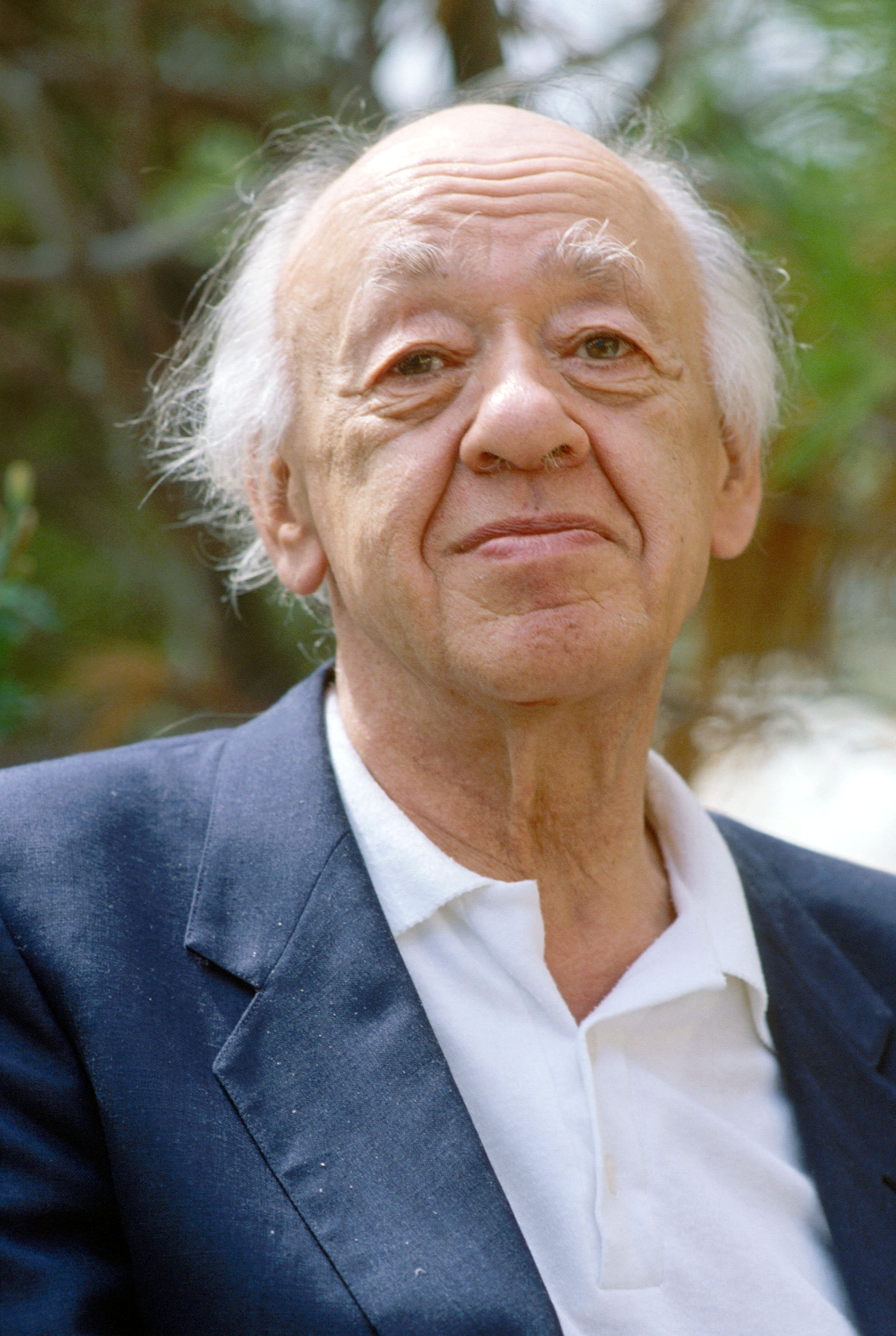
Eugen Ionescu

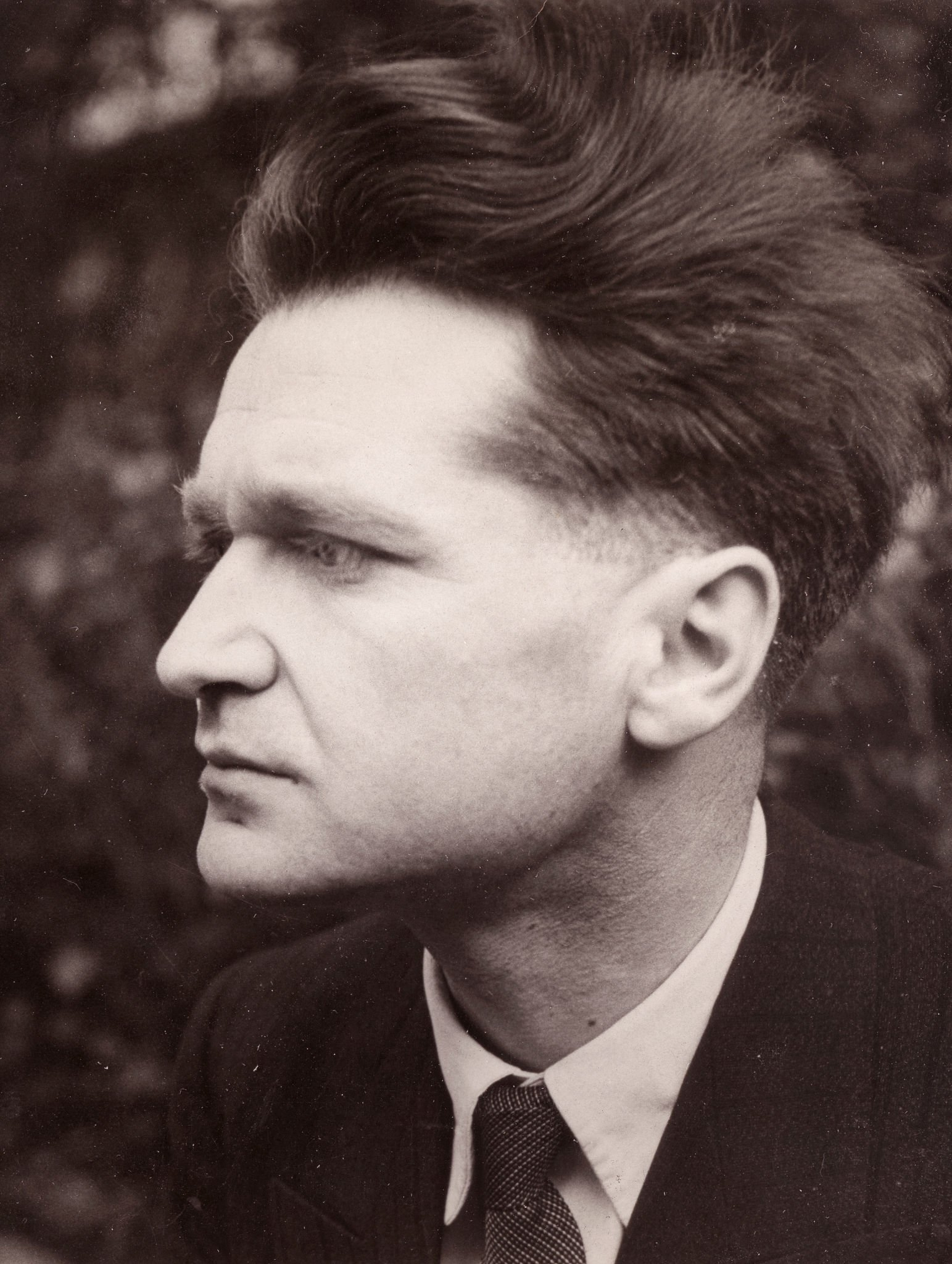
Emil Cioran

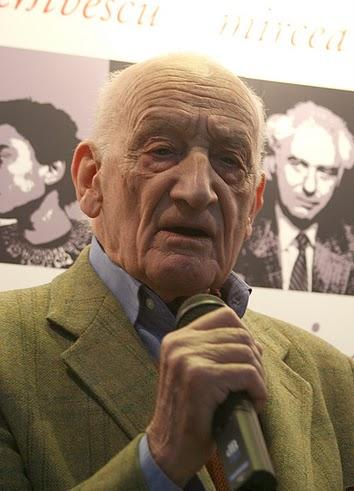
Neagu Djuvara

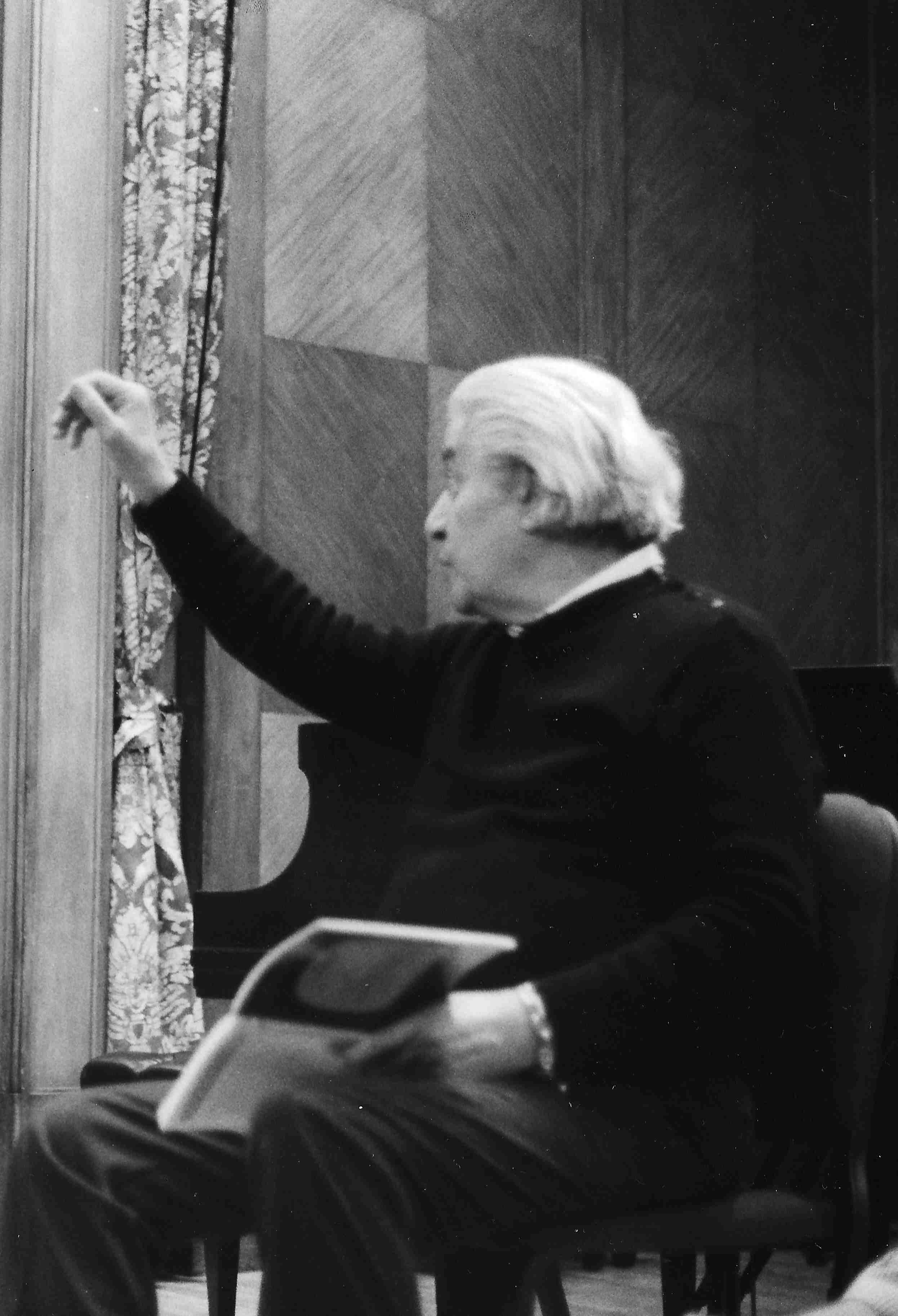
Sergiu Celibidache

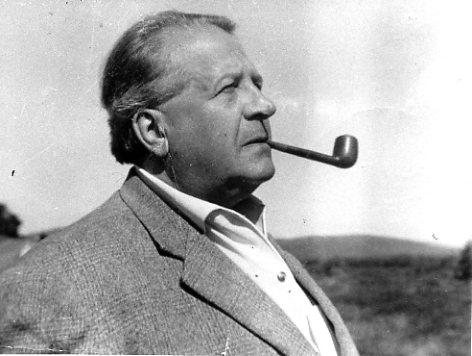
Stéphane Lupasco

=== Evolutions after 1989 ===
The fall of soviet-style communism in 1989 elated the cultural world, but the experience hasn't been an easy one due to problems in the transition period and the adoption of a free market economy. The discontinuation of state and political control of culture brought about the long dreamt freedom of expression, but, at the same time, the state subsidies also stopped, and Romania's culture was seriously affected by the side-effects of the incipient, still very imperfect, free-market economy and by inadequate material resources. Culture has had to cope with a variety of problems, one of them being a shift in people's interest towards other areas such as the press and television. The search for a new cultural policy, relying on decentralization, seems to prevail now. People speak about a crisis of culture in this country, but if there is a crisis of culture, it is only at an institutional level.

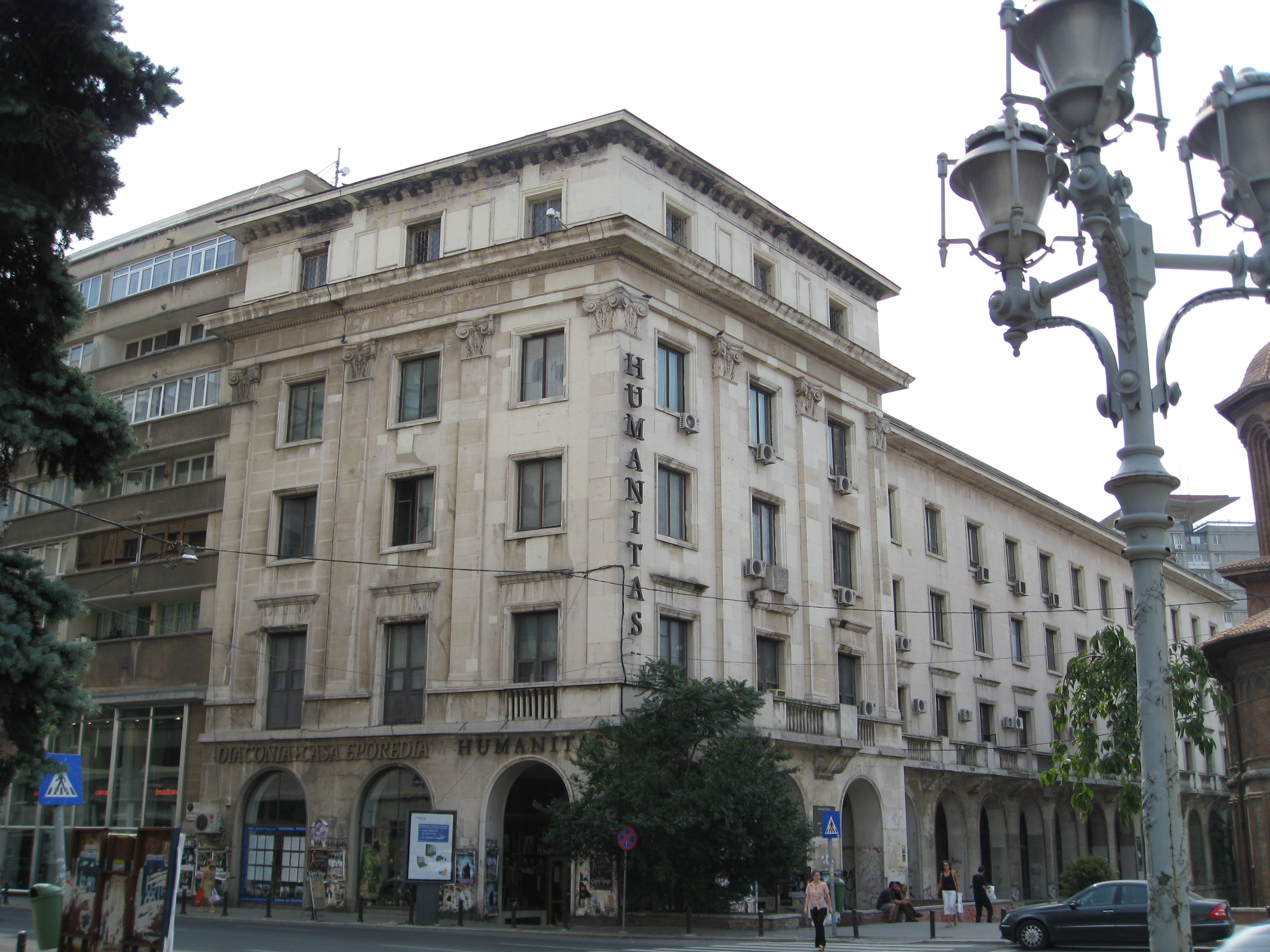
Humanitas headquarters in Bucharest

After the fall of communism in 1989, there was an almost immediate explosion of publication of books previously censored by the regime. Books were published in huge numbers per edition, sales were high, and a great number of publishing houses appeared. However, this soon reached a saturation point, and publishing houses began to decline due to a combination of bad management, a rapid drop in sales, and the absence of subsidies. Many closed after publishing only a few titles; some changed their profile and started printing commercial literature – mainly translations – and the state-owned publishers entered a "state of lethargy". The latter survived due to state financing, but their publishing activity diminished. Despite this, some publishing houses managed to survive and develop by implementing market-oriented policies, and by improving the quality and overall appearance of the books they published. Among the most notable contemporary Romanian publishers are Humanitas in Bucharest, Polirom in Iași, and Teora, which specializes in technical topics and dictionaries. Some publishing houses developed their own chains or bookstores, and also other new, privately owned bookstore chains opened, replacing the old state-owned ones.

Culturally oriented newsprint periodicals followed a similar trajectory of boom and bust. A few have survived and managed to raise their quality and to maintain a critical spirit despite the hardships they encountered. Dilema Veche (Old Dilemma) and Revista 22 (Magazine 22) remain respected forces in Romanian culture, with Observator Cultural a lesser, but also respected, weekly paper. Also, a state-financed radio (Radio România Cultural) and a television channel (TVR Cultural) with a cultural programme exist, but they are not highly popular.

Many new young writers appeared, but due to financial constraints, only those who have gained a strong reputation could get the financial backing to publish their works. The Writers's Union, which should, in principle, support these writers' efforts, hasn't undergone much change since 1989, and there is much controversy surrounding its activity and purpose. The most successful writers, like Mircea Cărtărescu, Gabriela Adamesteanu, Mircea Dinescu, Ana Blandiana, Doina Ruști, Radu Aldulescu, Claudiu Komartin etc

Horia-Roman Patapievici, Andrei Pleşu, Gabriel Liiceanu, and Herta Müller, are respected personalities in Romanian life, but they have to devote some of their would-be writing time to other activities, mainly journalism.

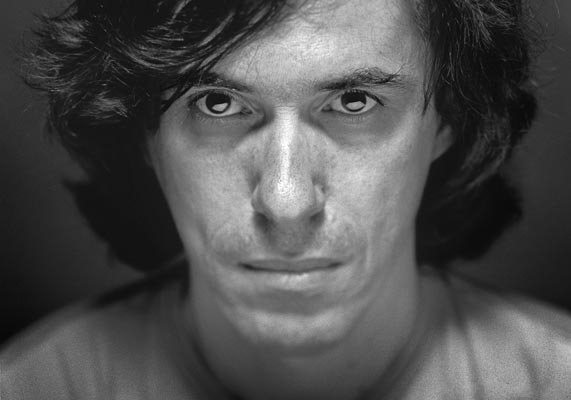
Mircea Cărtărescu

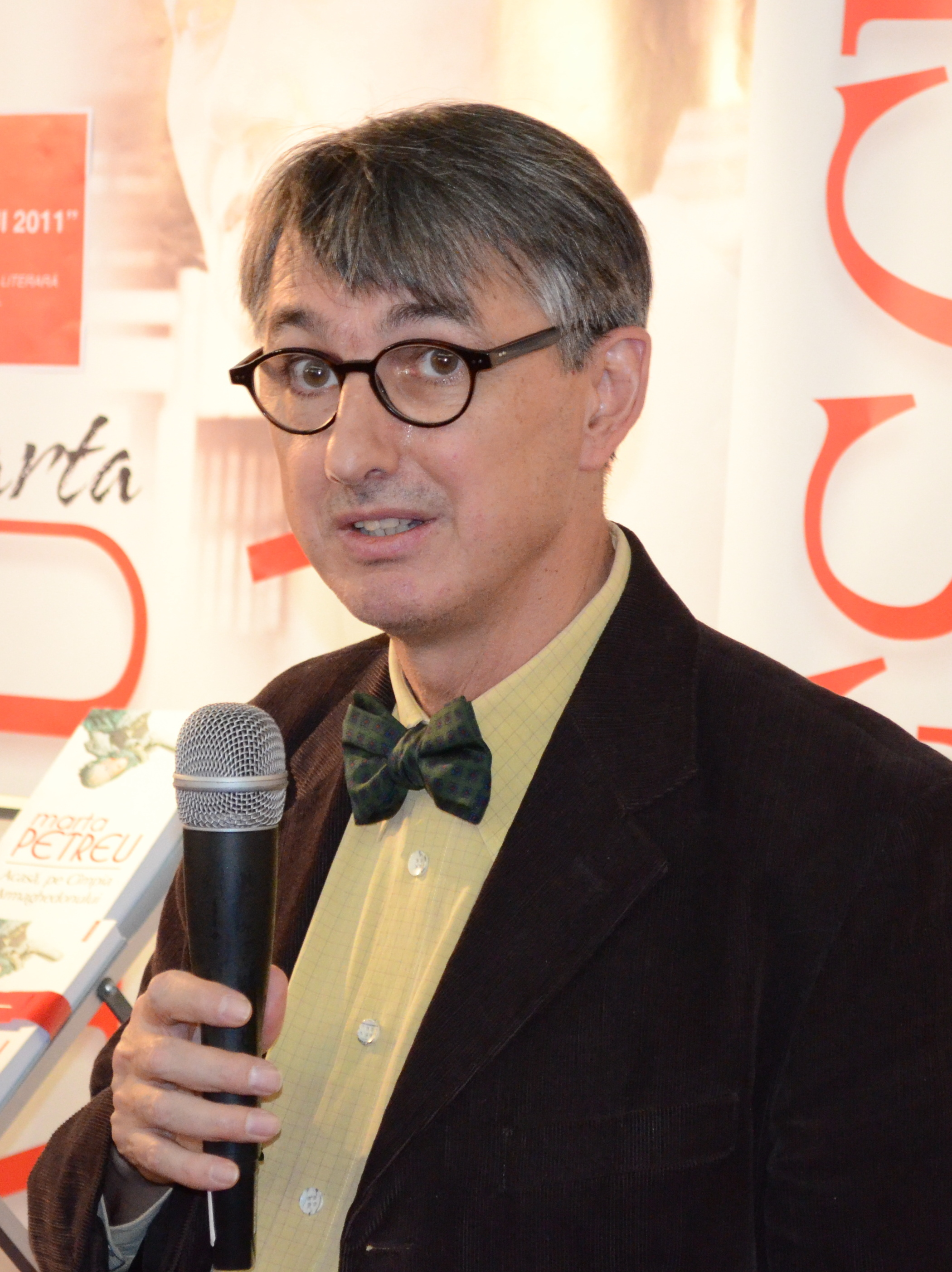
Horia-Roman Patapievici

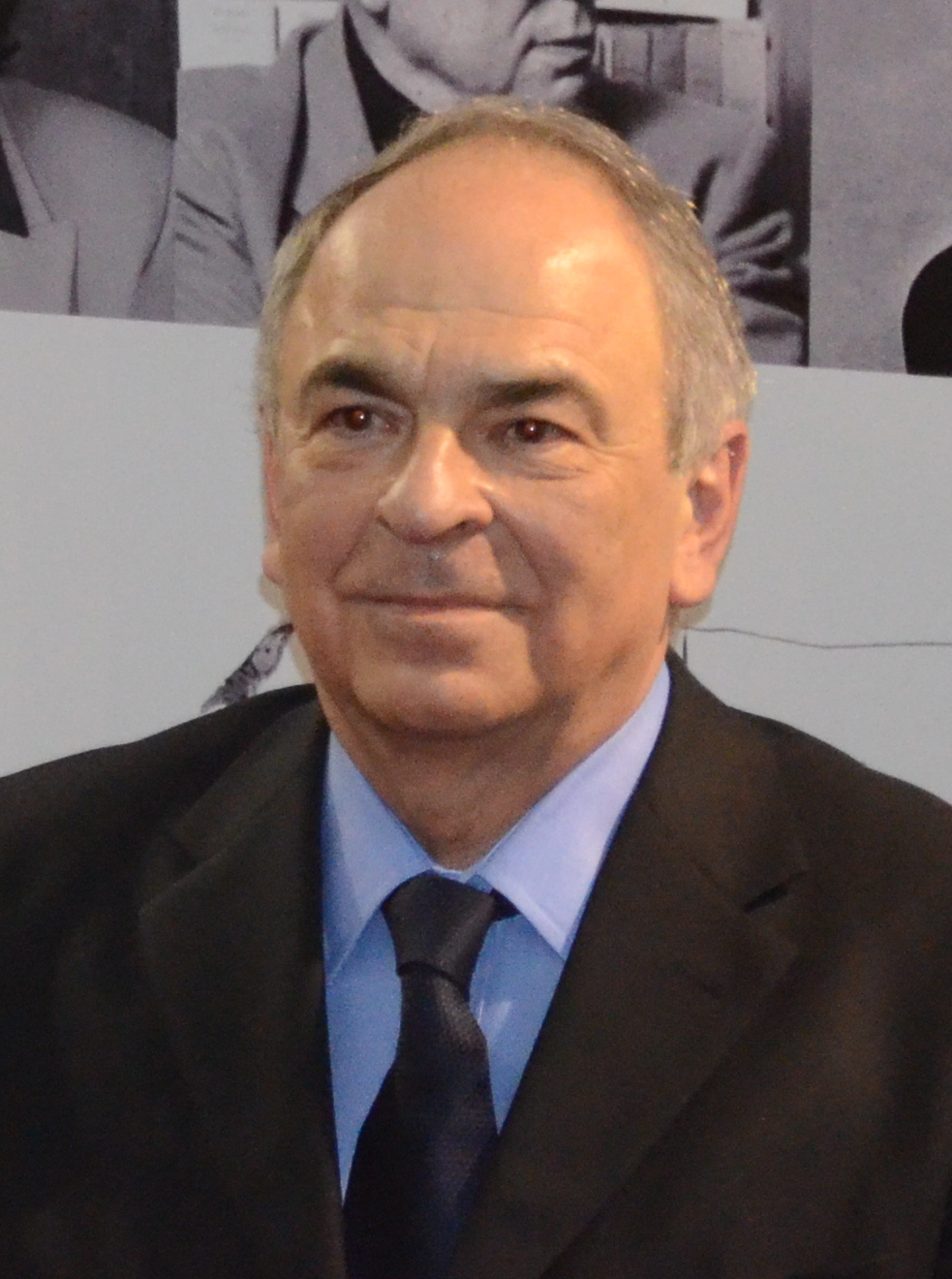
Gabriel Liiceanu

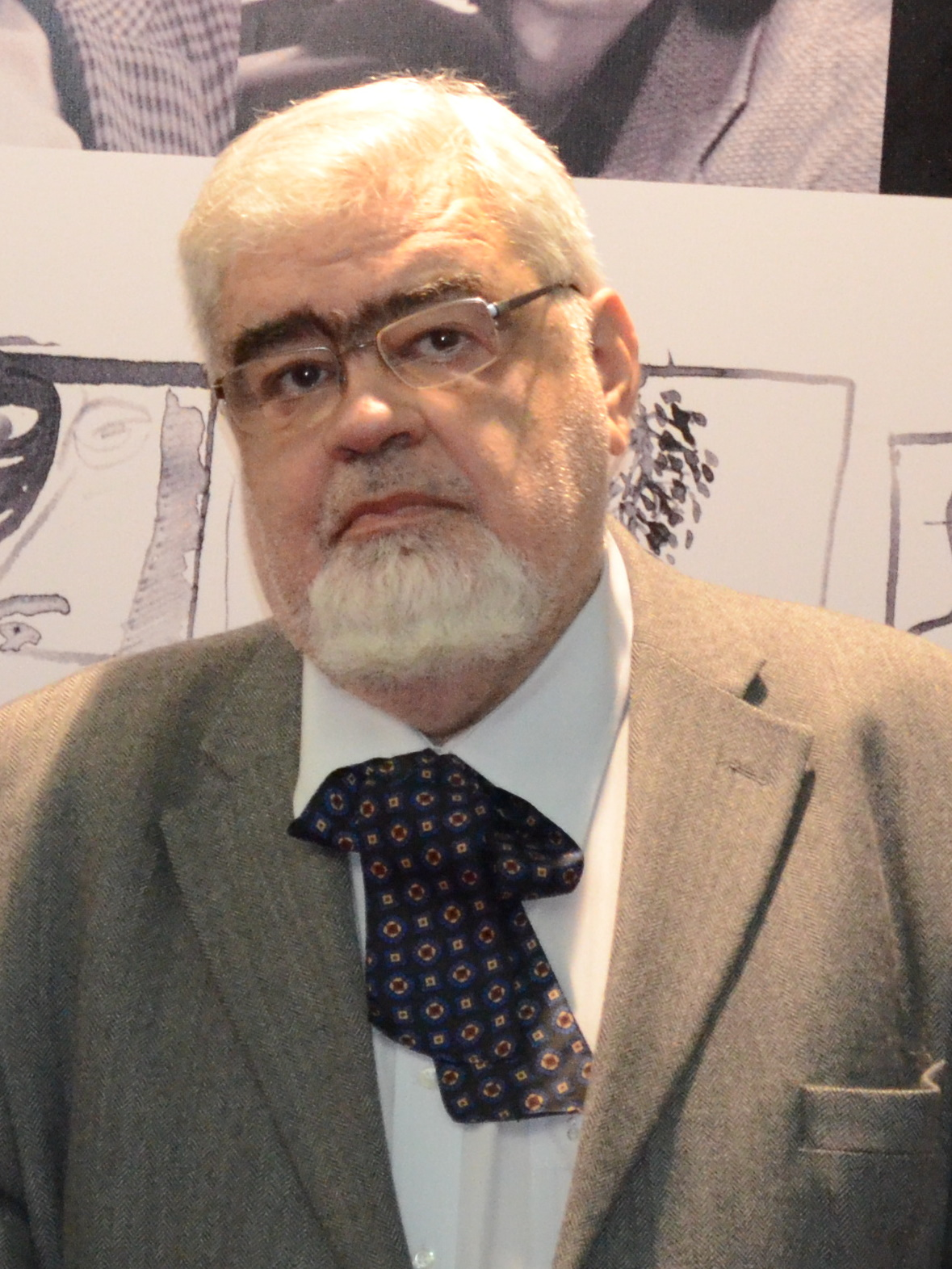
Andrei Pleșu

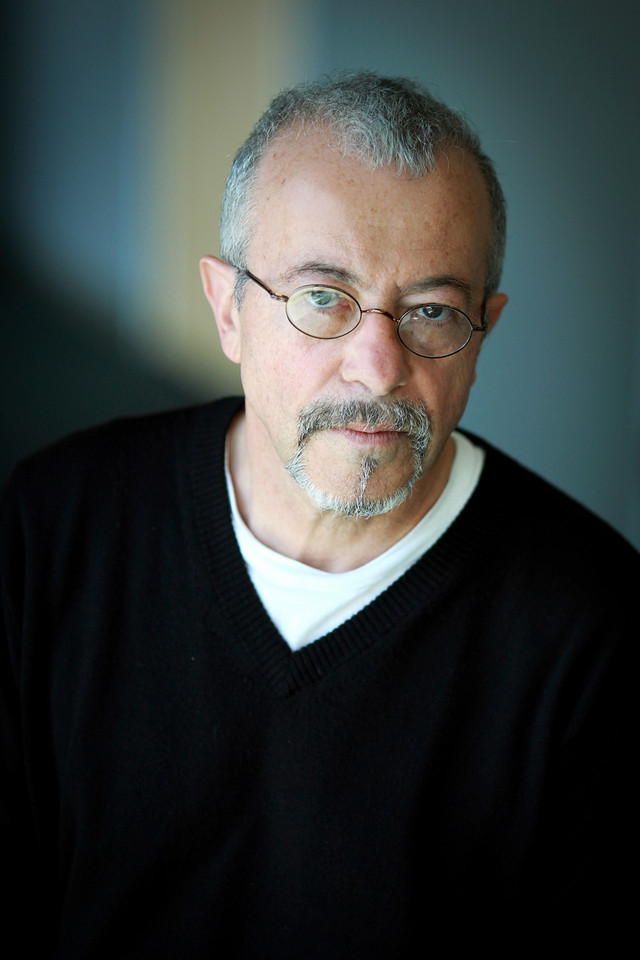
Andrei Codrescu

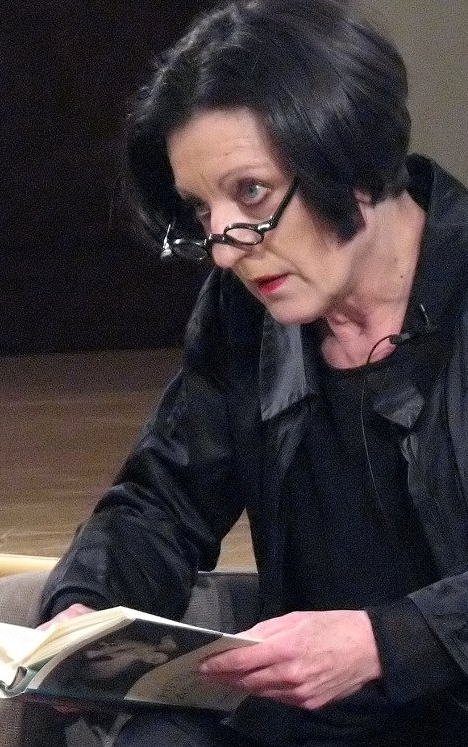
Herta Müller

Romanian theatre also suffered from economic hardships, and its popularity decreased drastically due to the increased popularity of television and other entertainment channels. Some theatres survived due to their prestige (and some continued subsidies); others survived through good management, investing in themselves, and earning a steady audience through the high quality of their productions. Experimental or independent theatres appeared and are quite popular in university cities. Uniter – The Romanian Theatres Association – gives yearly awards to the best performances. Some of the most critically acclaimed directors in contemporary Romania are Andrei Șerban, Silviu Purcărete, Mihai Măniuțiu, Gábor Tompa, Alexandru Dabija, Victor Ioan Frunză, Radu Afrim and Alexandru Darie. Also, among the most appreciated actors, both from the new and old generation, one can name Ștefan Iordache, Victor Rebengiuc, Maia Morgenstern, Marcel Iureș, Horațiu Mălăele, Ion Caramitru, Mircea Diaconu, Marius Chivu and others.

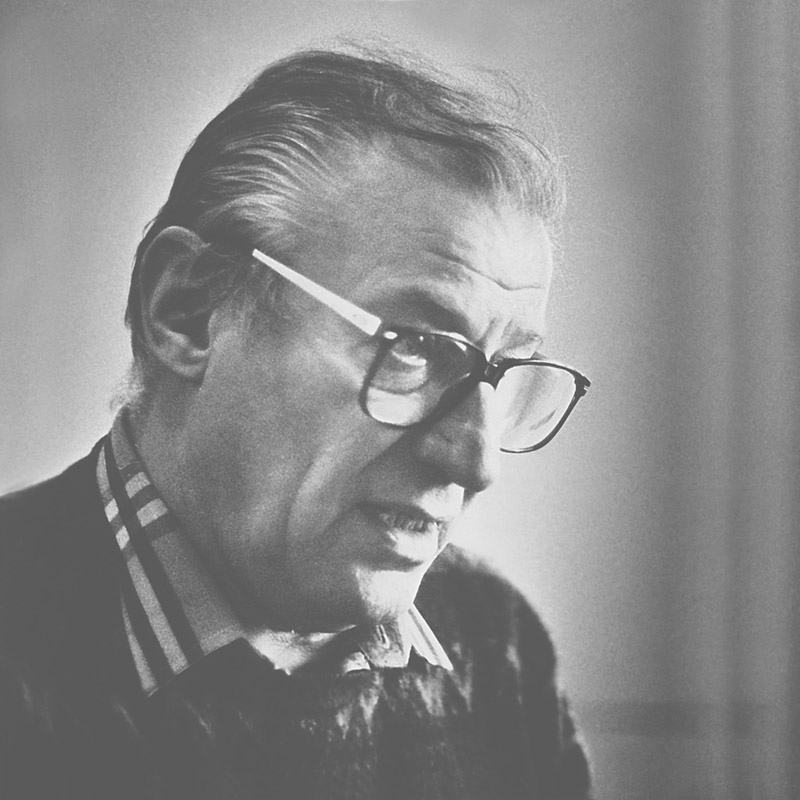
Victor Rebengiuc

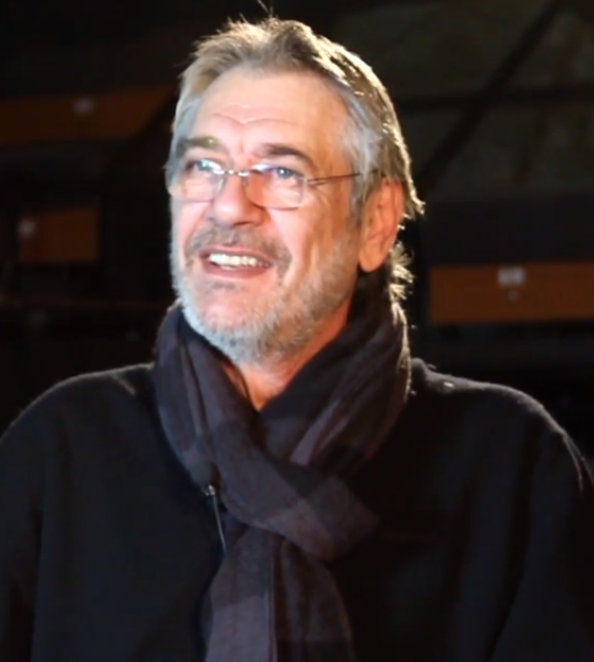
Marcel Iureș

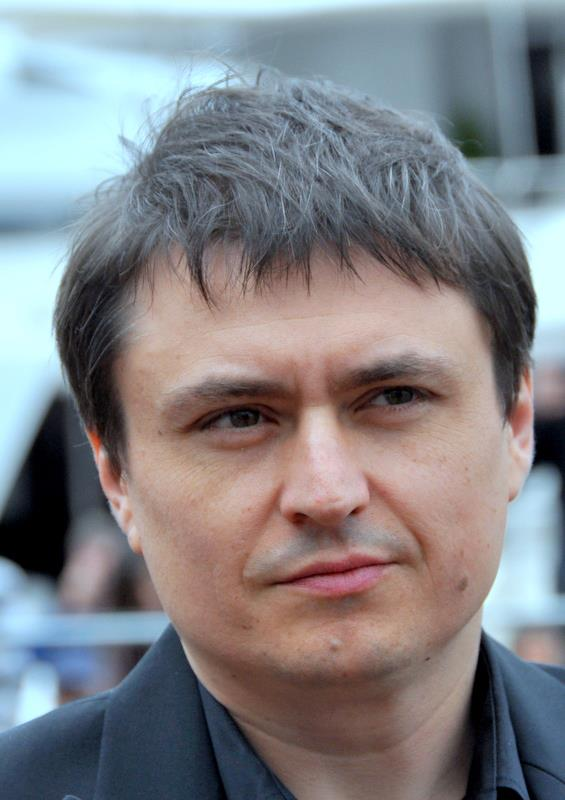
Cristian Mungiu

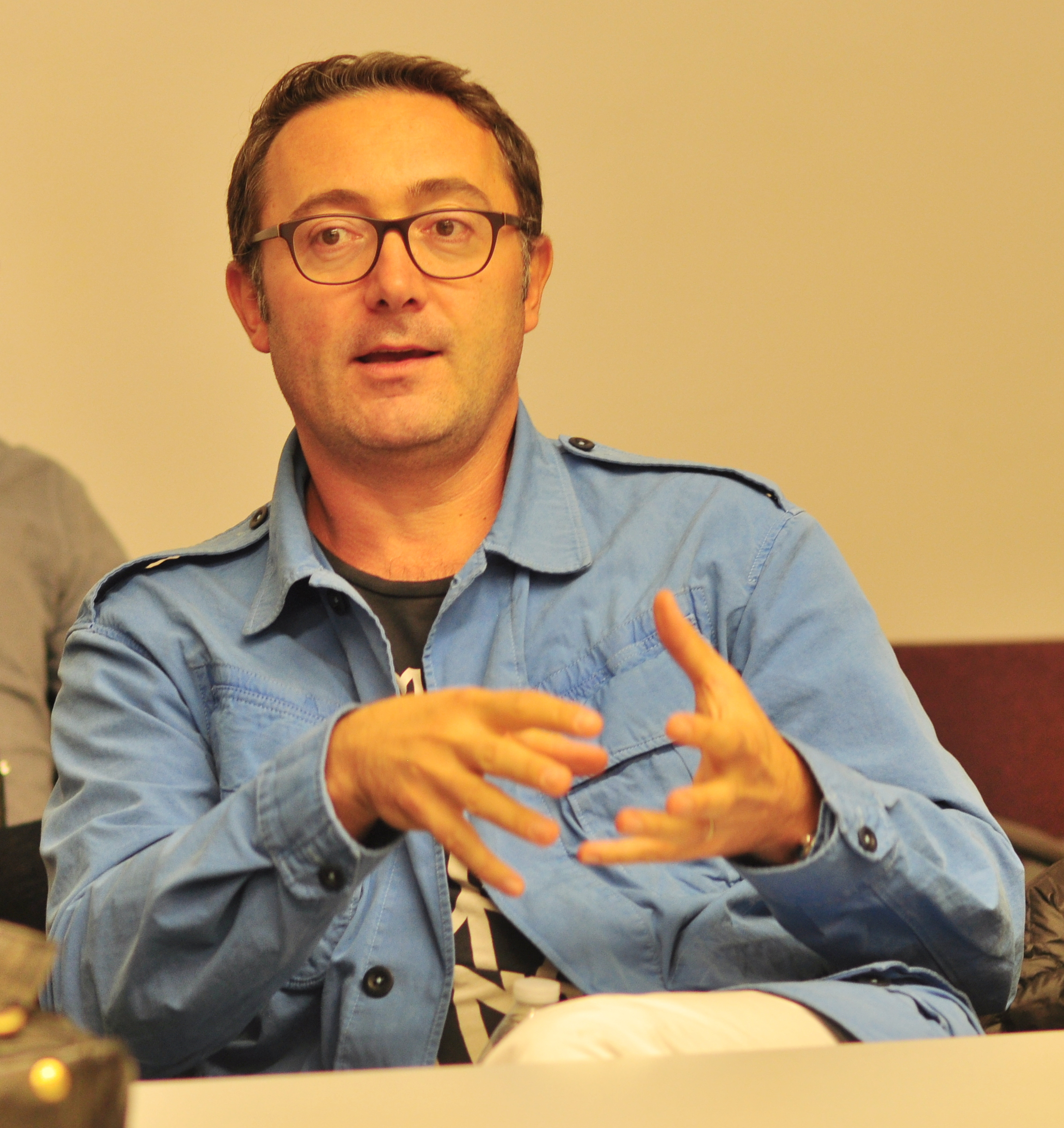
Tudor Giurgiu

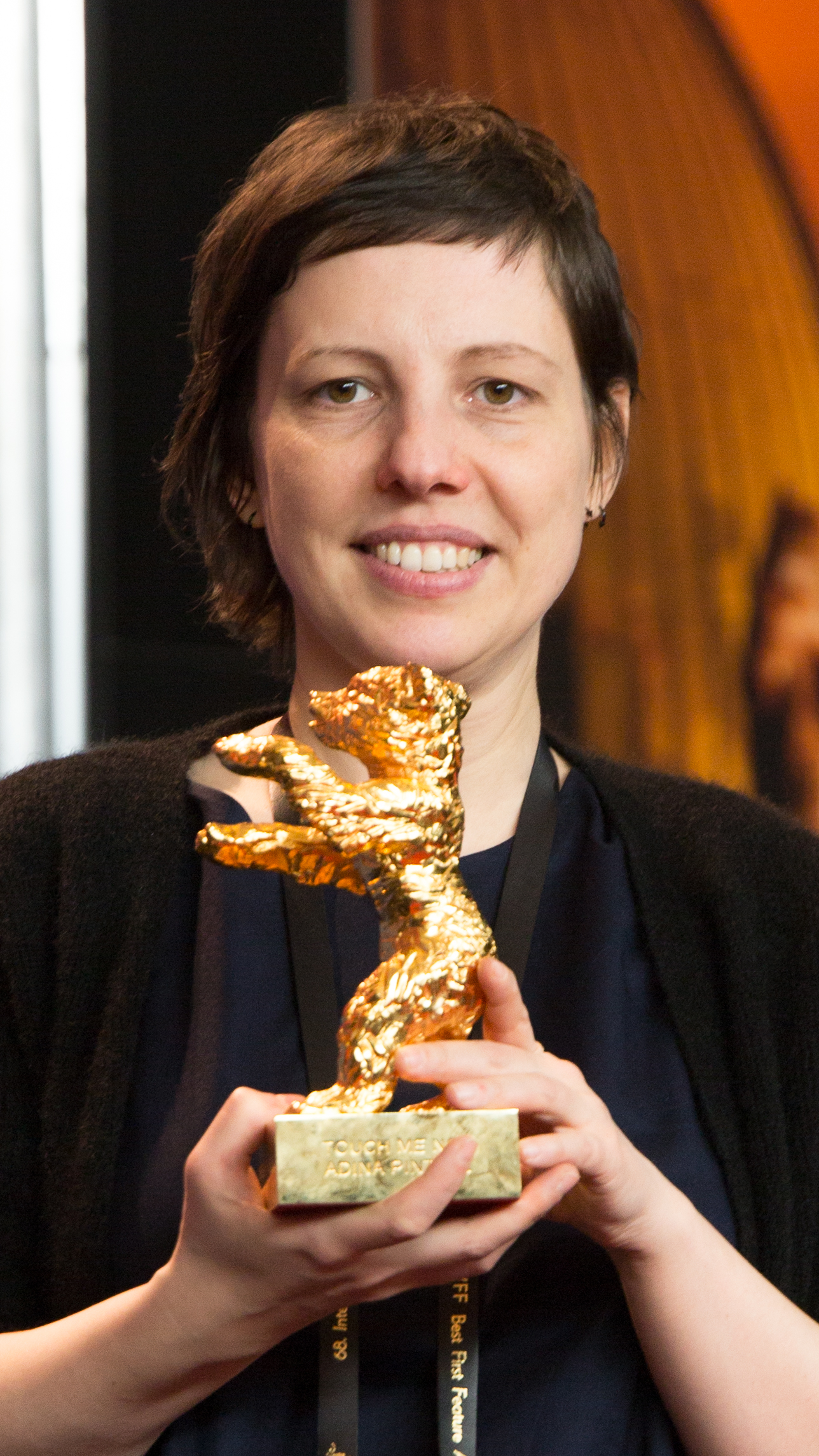
Adina Pintilie

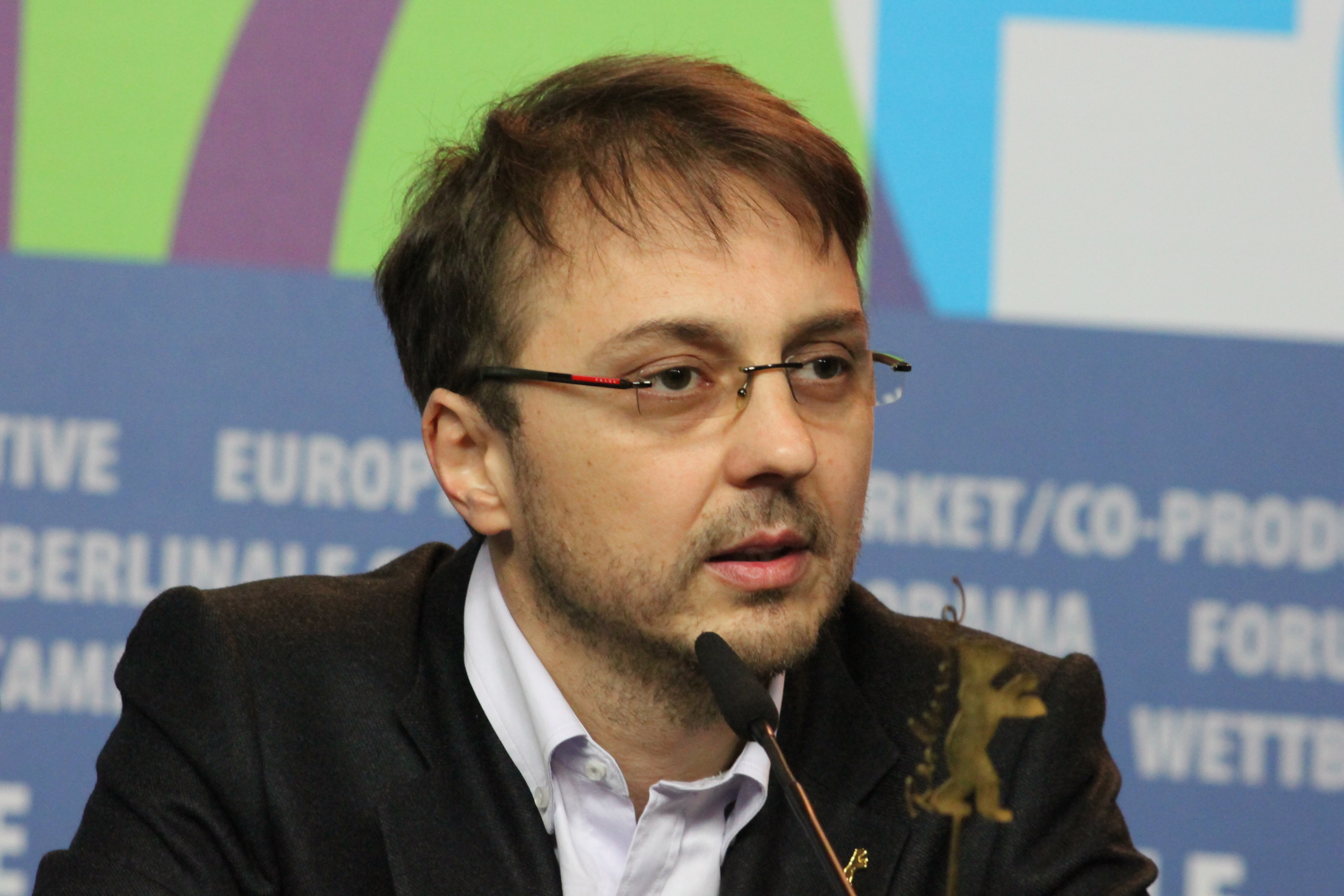
Călin Peter Netzer

Due to the lack of funds, Romanian film-making suffered heavily in the 1990s; even now, as of 2005, a lot of controversy surrounds state aid for movies. Well-known directors such as Dan Piţa and Lucian Pintilie have had a certain degree of continued success, and younger directors such as Cristian Mungiu, Nae Caranfil, Cristi Puiu, Corneliu Porumboiu, Radu Jude and Radu Muntean have become highly respected. Caranfil's film Filantropica and Puiu's The Death of Mr. Lazarescu were extremely well received and gained awards at international festivals in Paris and Cannes. Besides domestic production, Romania became a favorite destination for international producers due to the low cost of filming there, and big investments have been made in large studios.

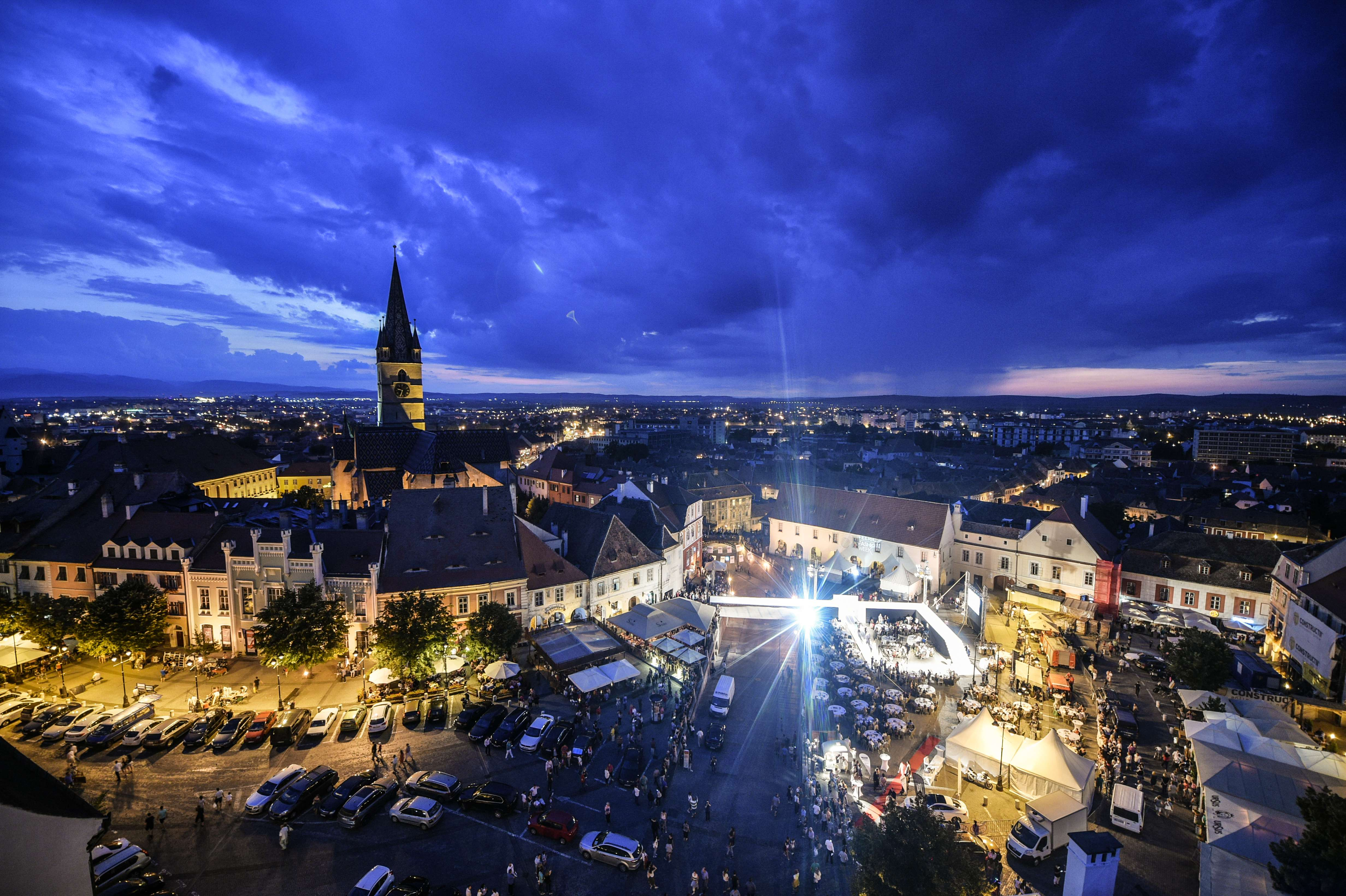
Sibiu (Hungarian: Nagyszeben, German: Hermannstadt), the 2007 European Capital of Culture

The number of cultural events held yearly in Romania has increased over the past few years. Some sporadic events like the "2005 Bucharest CowParade" have been well received, and yearly events and festivals have continually attracted interest. Medieval festivals held in cities in Transylvania, which combine street theatre with music and battle reenactments to create a very lively atmosphere, are some of the most popular events. In theatre, a yearly National Festival takes place, and one of the most important international theatre festivals is "The Sibiu Theatre Festival", while in filmmaking, the "TIFF" Film Festival in Cluj, the "Dakino" Film Festival in Bucharest and the "Anonimul" Film Festival in the Danube Delta have an ever-stronger international presence. In music, the most important event is the "George Enescu" Classical Music Festival, but festivals like "Jeunesses Musicales" International Festival and Jazz festivals in Sibiu, Cluj and Bucharest are also appreciated. An important event took place in 2007 when the city of Sibiu was, along with Luxembourg, the European Capital of Culture.

=== Mythology ===
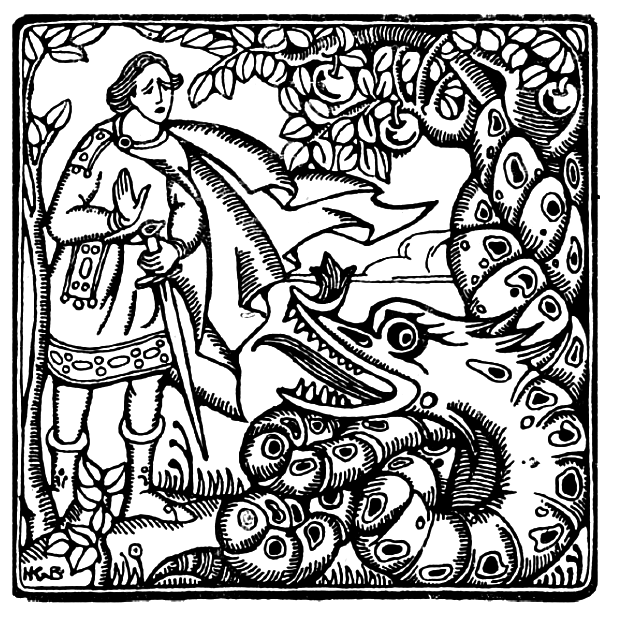
Engraving of a fairy tale scene, featuring Prince Charming (Făt-Frumos) and a dragon (zmeu).

Romanians have had, from time immemorial, a myriad of customs, tales, and poems about love, faith, kings, princesses, and witches. The ethnologists, poets, writers, and historians have tried in recent centuries to collect and to preserve tales, poems, ballads and have tried to describe as well as possible the customs and habits related to different events and times of the year. Customs related to certain times of year are the colinde, Romanian Christmas carols, sorcova on New Year's Eve, or the Mărțișor custom on the first day of March, marking the spring. Other customs are presumably of pre-Christian pagan origin, like the Paparuda rain enchanting custom in the summer, or the masked folk theatre or Ursul (the bear) and Capra (the goat) in winter.

Perhaps the most successful collector of folk tales was the novelist and storyteller Ion Creangă, who in very picturesque language, shaped into their now-classic form stories like Harap Alb ("The White Moor") or Fata babei și fata moșului (roughly, "The old woman's daughter and the old man's daughter").

Also, the poet Vasile Alecsandri published the most successful version of the ballad Miorița (The Little Ewe), a sad, philosophical poem, centered on a simple action: the plot by two shepherds to kill a third shepherd because they envied his wealth. Another prolific editor of folk tales was Petre Ispirescu, who, in the 19th century, published an impressive number of volumes containing a large number of short novels and tales from popular mythology. They are centered on popular characters like the prince Făt-Frumos (the Romanian "Prince Charming"), the princess Ileana Cosânzeana, the villain or monster Zmeu or Căpcăun, the dragon Balaur, or fantastic superbeings like the good Zână and the evil Muma Pădurii.

=== Spirituality and religion ===
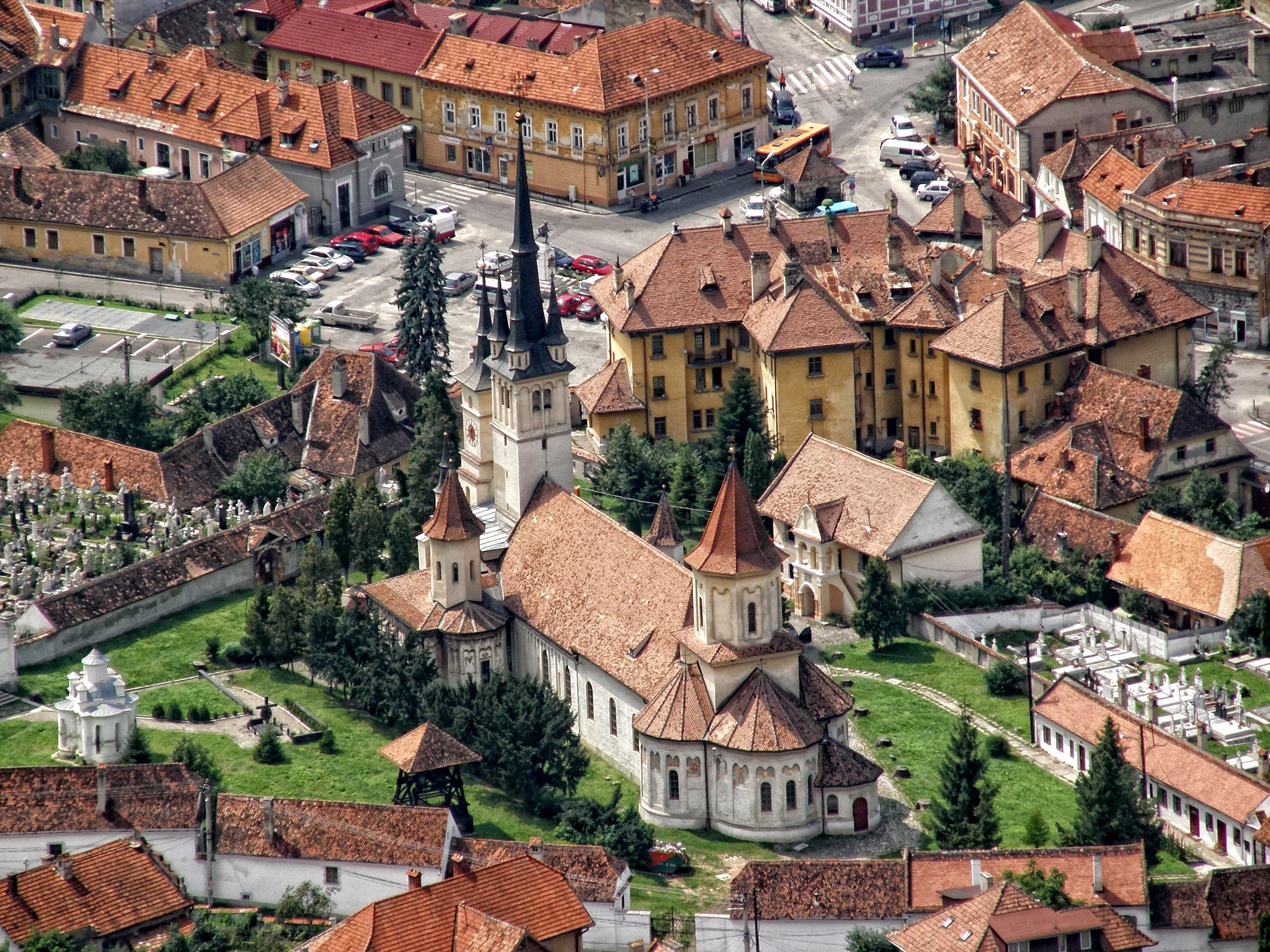
St. Nicholas Church, Brașov in Brașov (Hungarian: Brassó)

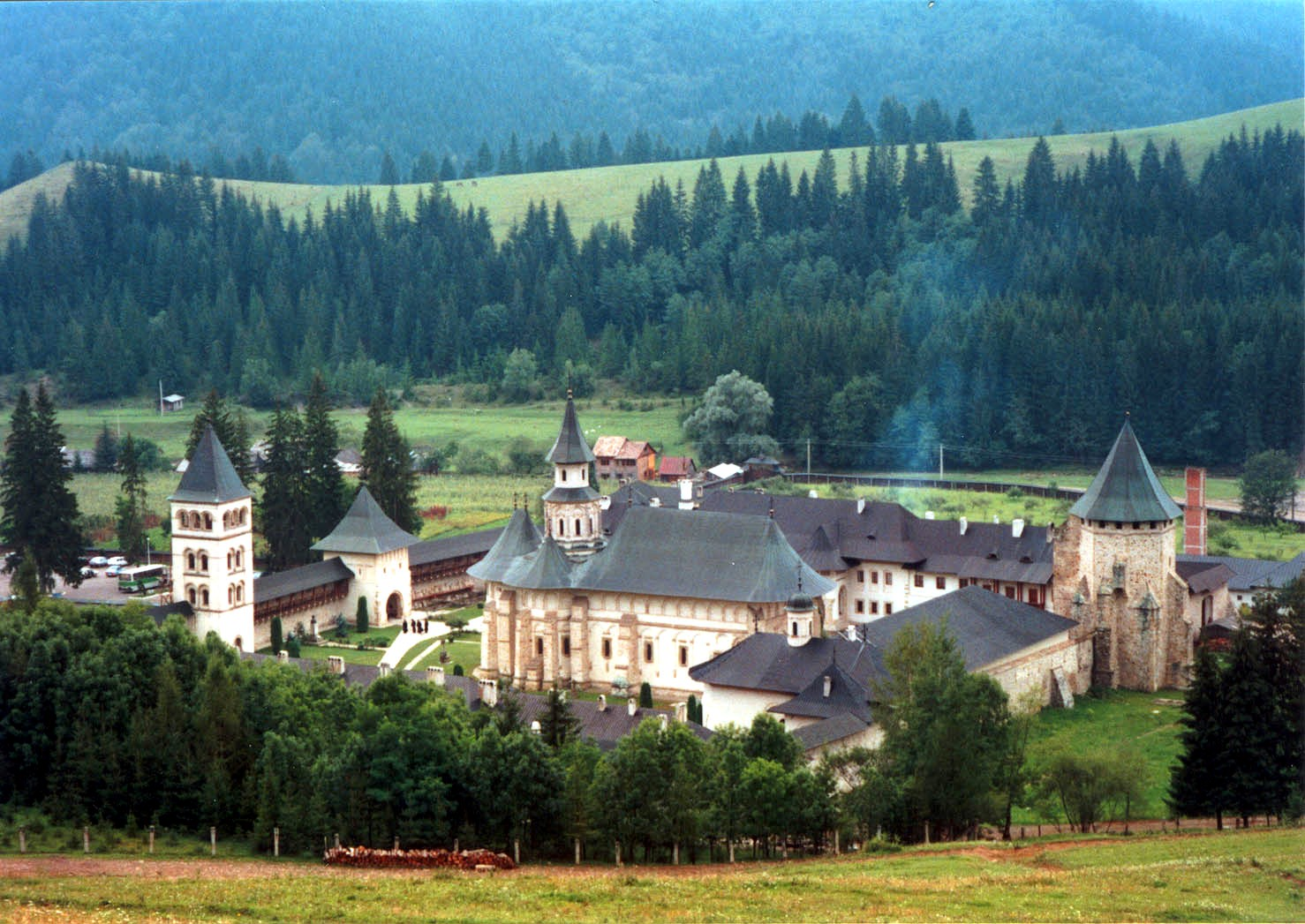
Putna Monastery in Suceava County, Bukovina

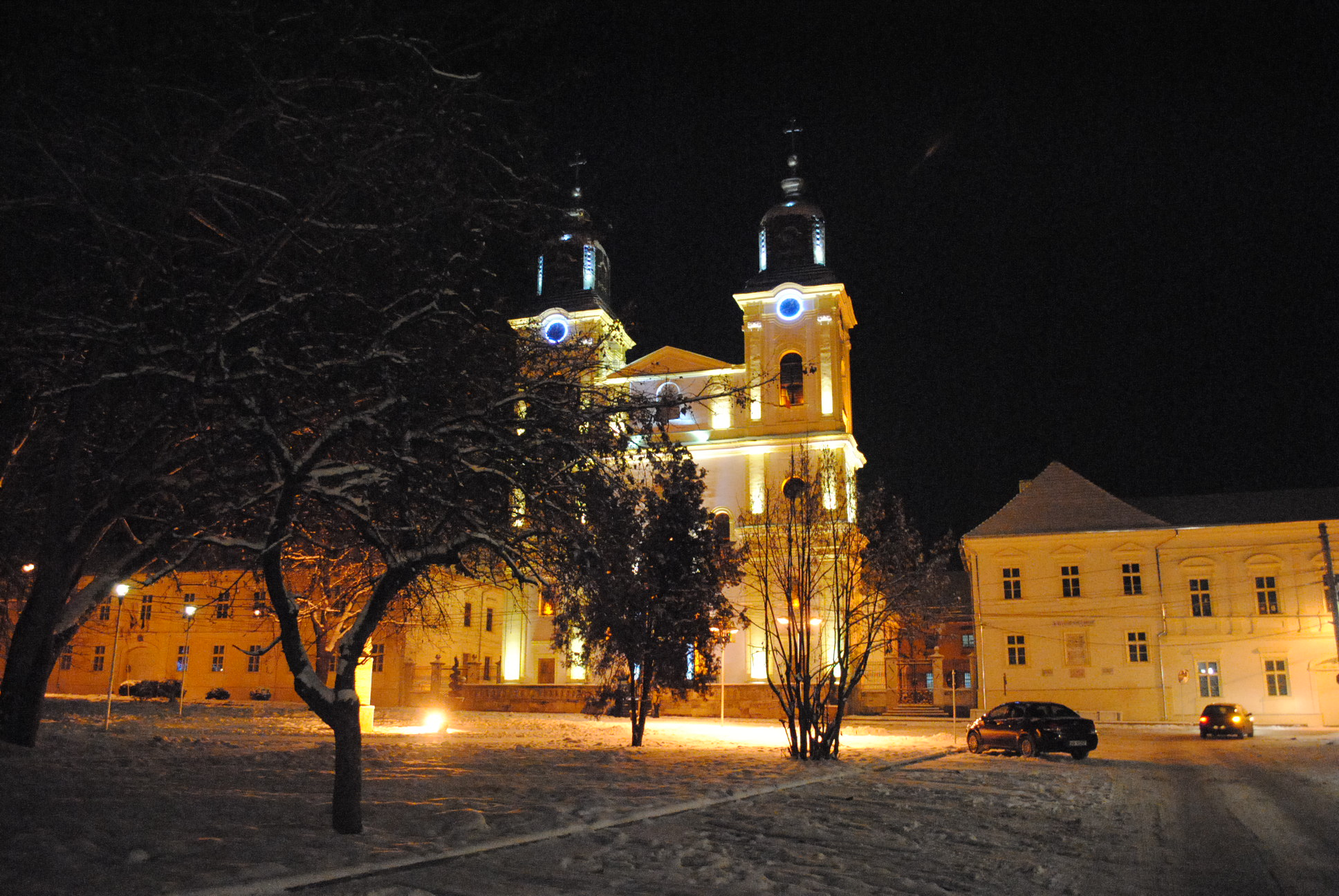
Greek Catholic cathedral in Blaj, Transylvania(Hungarian: Balázsfalva)

Romanian spirituality is greatly influenced by its strong connections with the Eastern Christian world. The modern national mythology contends Romanians are An island of Latinity in a Slavic sea and The only Orthodox Christian Latin people. There are only a few Romanian Catholics (of both the Roman and Greek rites) and a small number of Protestants, the vast majority of Romanians being Romanian Orthodox (over 81%). Despite the diminishing importance of the church in recent generations, it remains the most trusted institution in Romania. Church attendance is high in rural communities and among the elders in the cities. Also, despite accusations of collaborationism with the communist regime, which continue to plague the Romanian Church, some clerics such as Dumitru Stăniloae and Richard Wurmbrand openly protested against political interventions in religious business. There are also some Muslims living in the country.

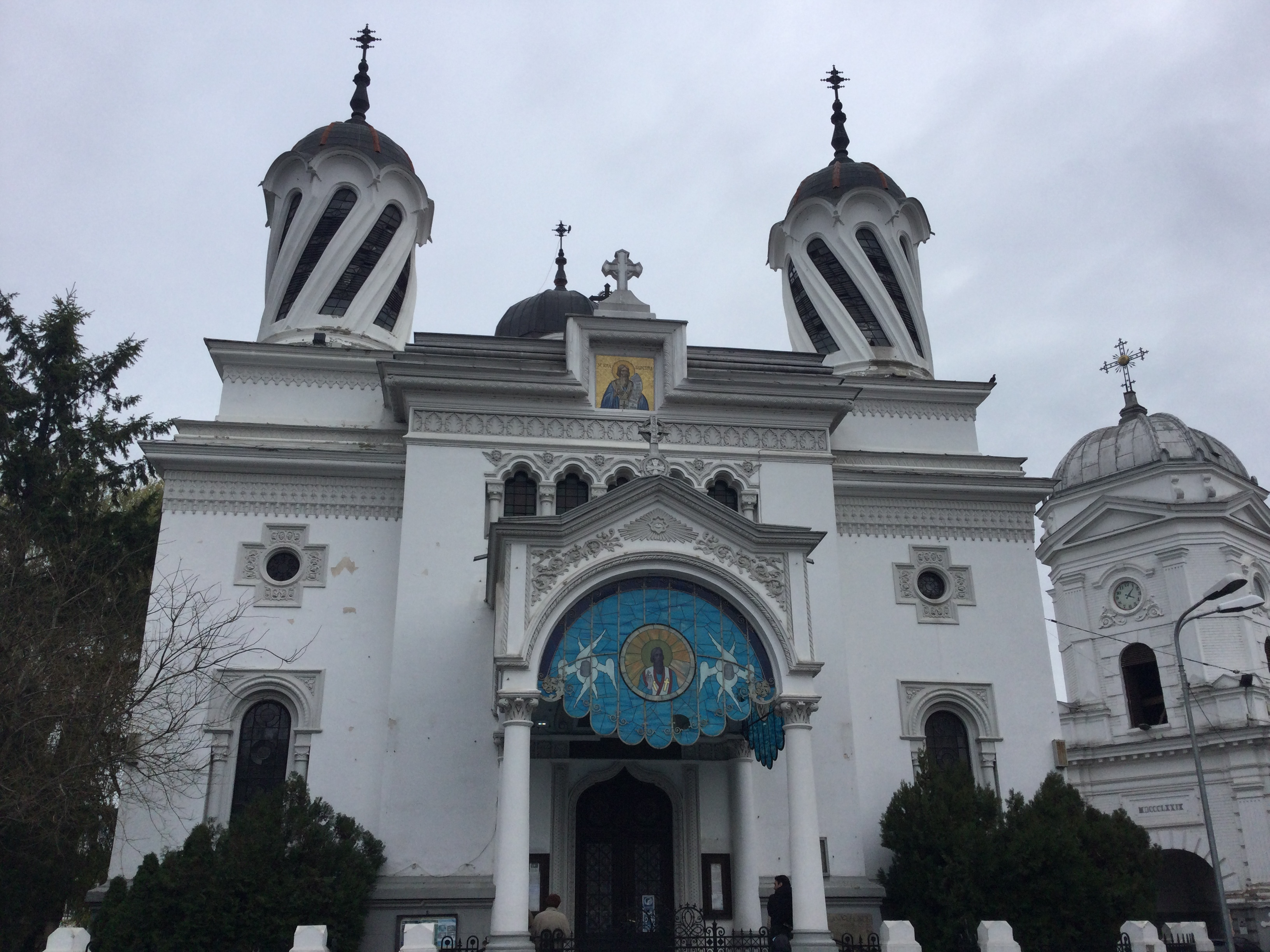
St. Sylvester's Church in Bucharest

Romanian Orthodox monasteries and churches exist throughout Romania, but traditionally, few are constructed on a monumental scale. A great number of wooden churches are still intact in the Carpathian Mountains villages, but by far, the most impressive is the Wooden Churches of Maramureș, which push wood building technique to its limits. Byzantine influences can be found in most Romanian church buildings, but domestic styles have evolved in different periods of time and in different regions. In Moldavia, a particular style was used in the construction of the monasteries, of which some of the most important are the churches of northern Moldavia – UNESCO World Heritage Sites, such as those of Moldovița, Putna, Sucevița, or Voroneț. In Wallachia, Curtea de Argeș Cathedral was built in a Byzantine style with Moorish influences, and a great number of churches show Greek influences, especially those built in the 18th century, such as Stavropoleos Church in central Bucharest. Romania also evolved the distinctive Brâncovenesc style: the monasteries of Snagov and of Sâmbăta de Sus in Transylvania are classic examples.

Beyond formal religious practice, Romanian spirituality often blends Orthodox Christian belief with folk traditions, ancestral customs, and seasonal rituals. In many rural communities, faith is closely tied to the agricultural calendar and family life, with blessings, icons, and prayers integrated into daily routines. Spiritual observances such as the blessing of homes at Epiphany or lighting candles for the dead at Easter remain widespread, reflecting a deep-rooted, lived religiosity.

=== Cuisine ===
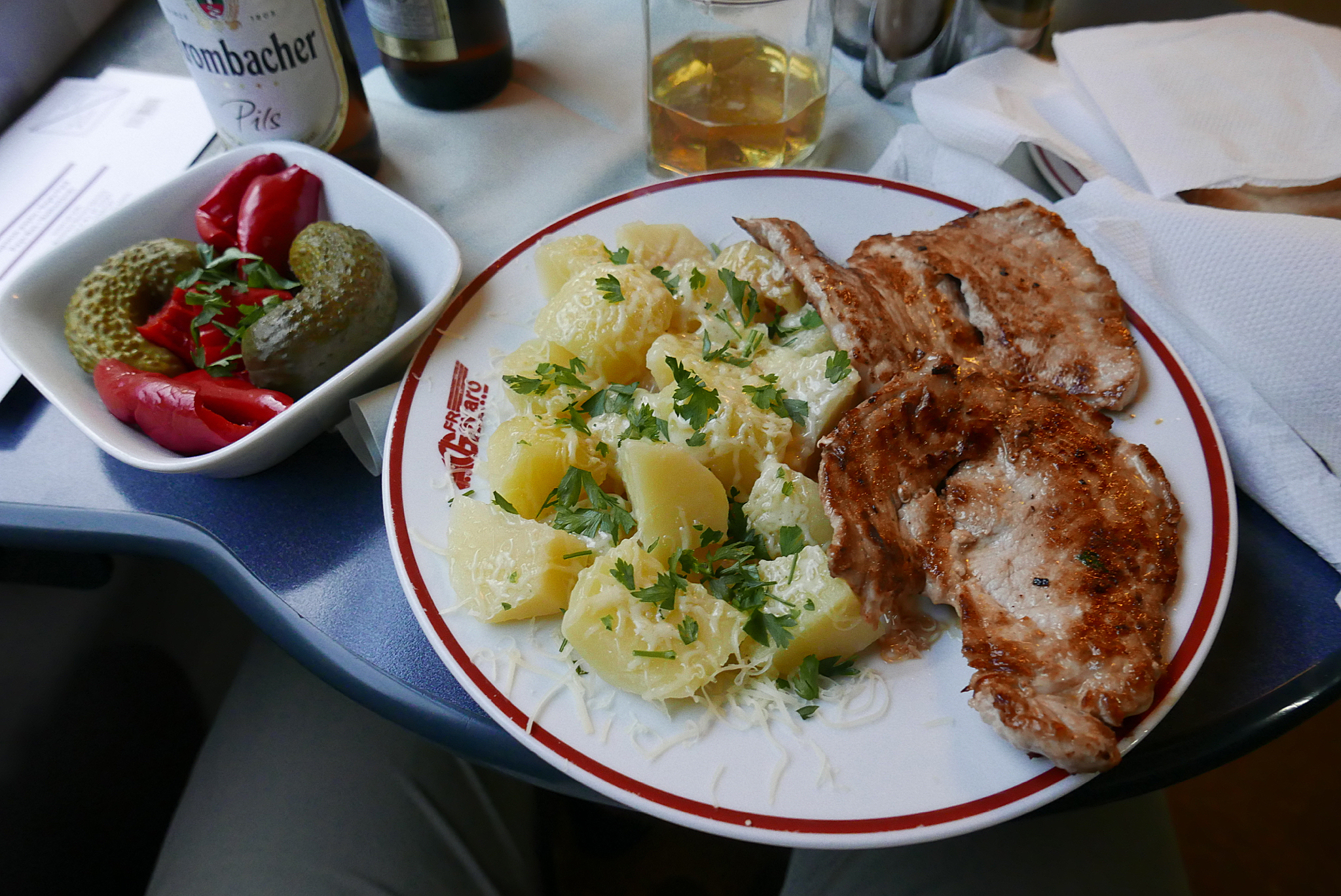
Baked potatoes with steak and cucumber salad

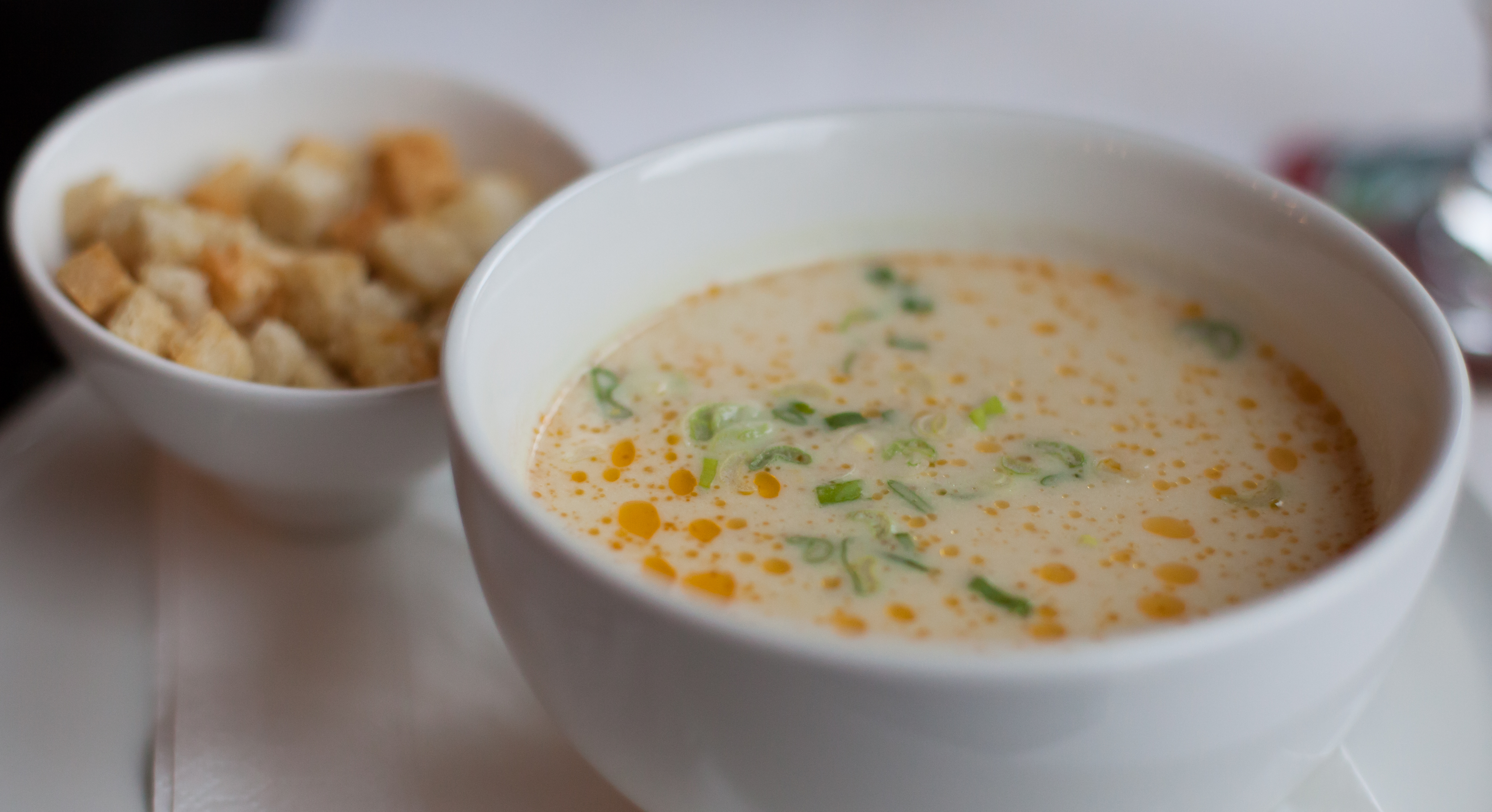
Mustard soup with croutons

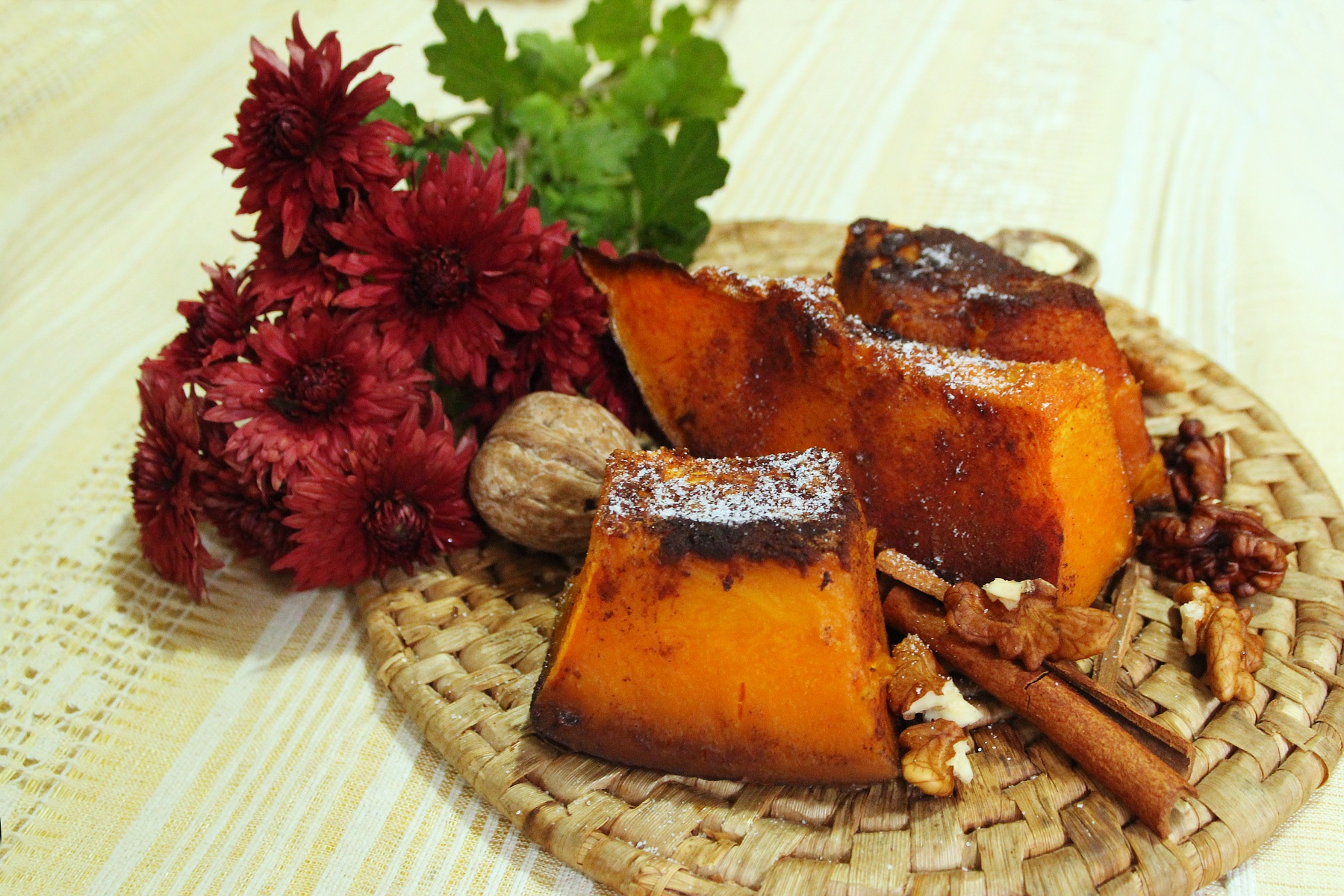
Baked pumpkin with powdered sugar and cinnamon

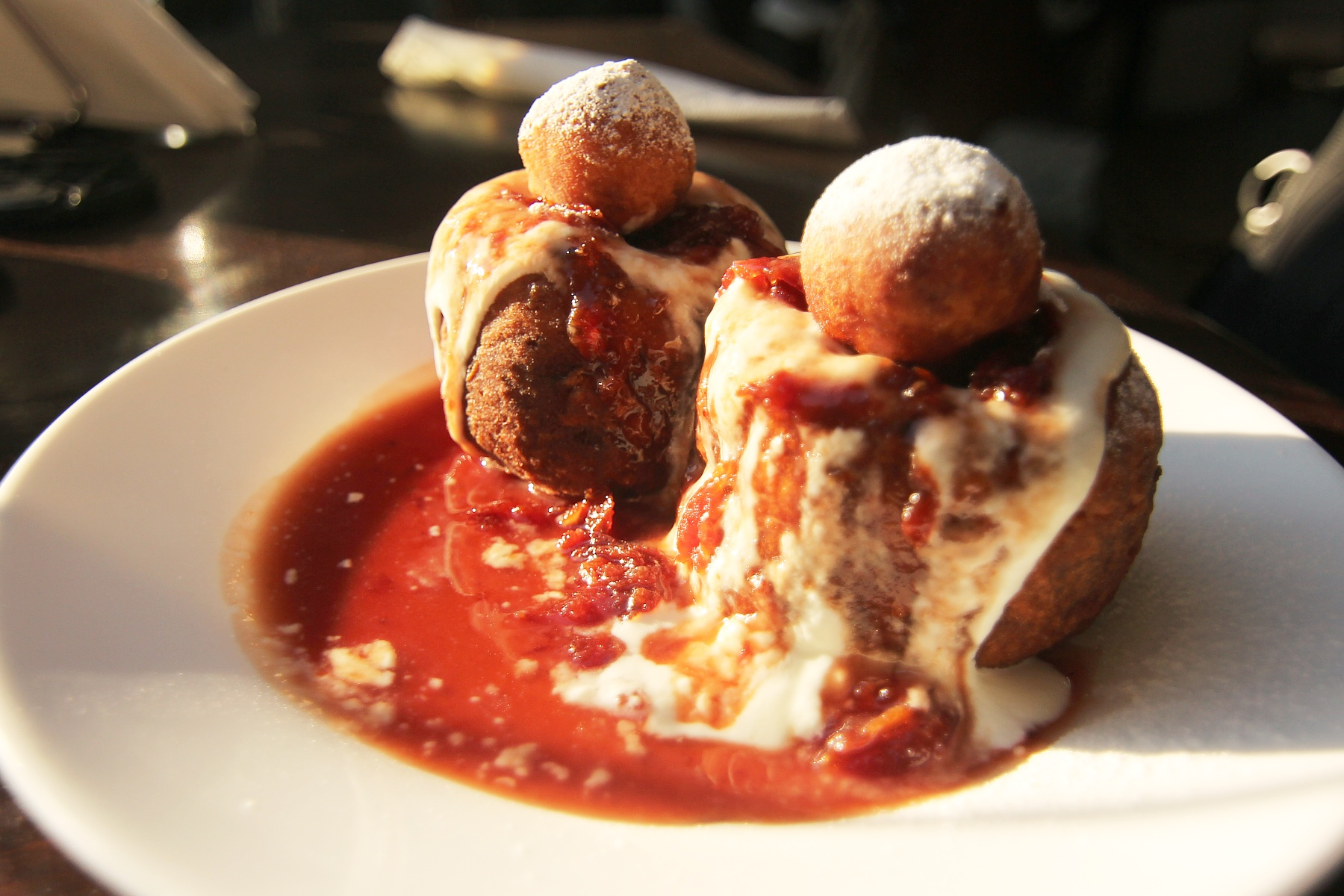
Papanași

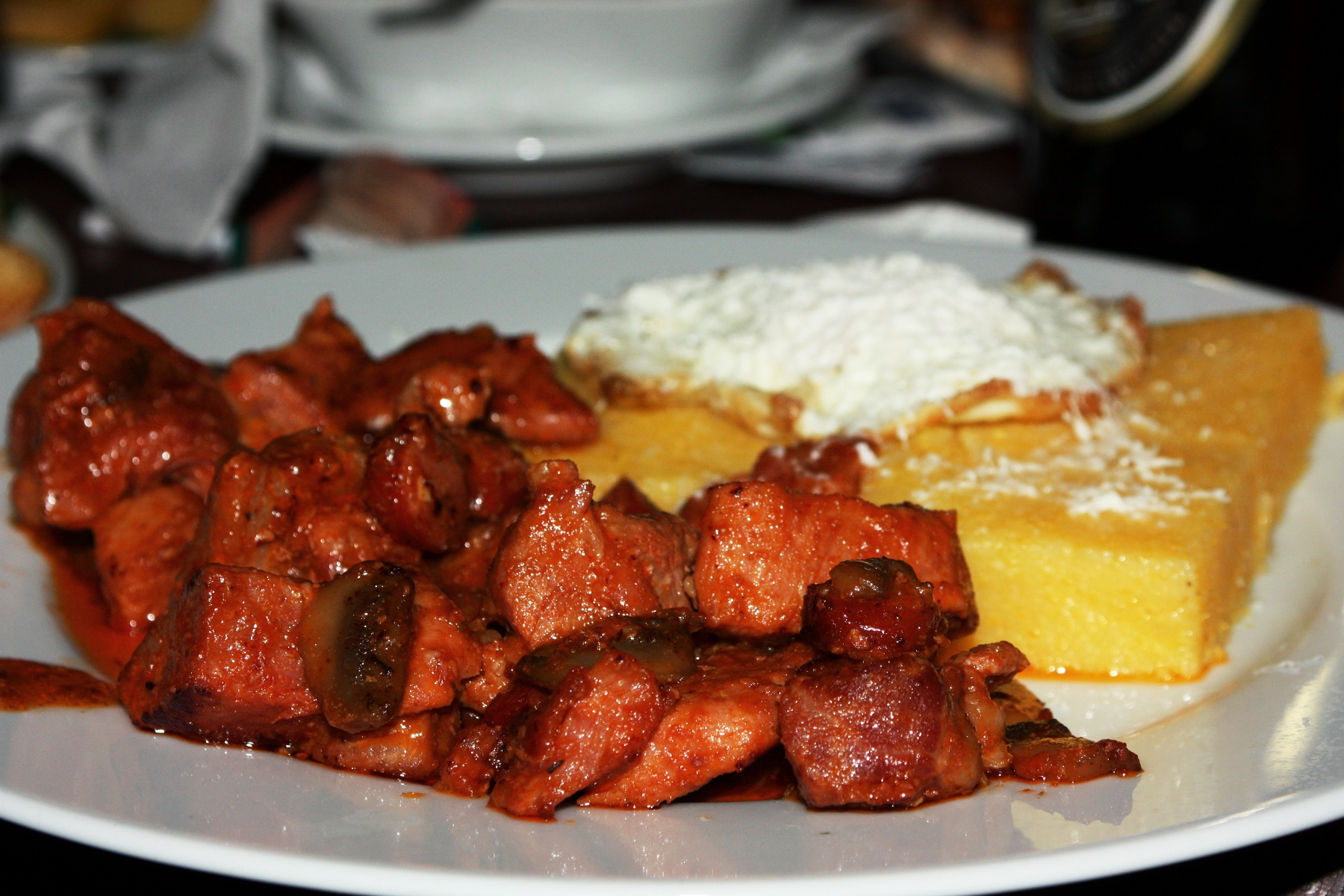
Tochitură

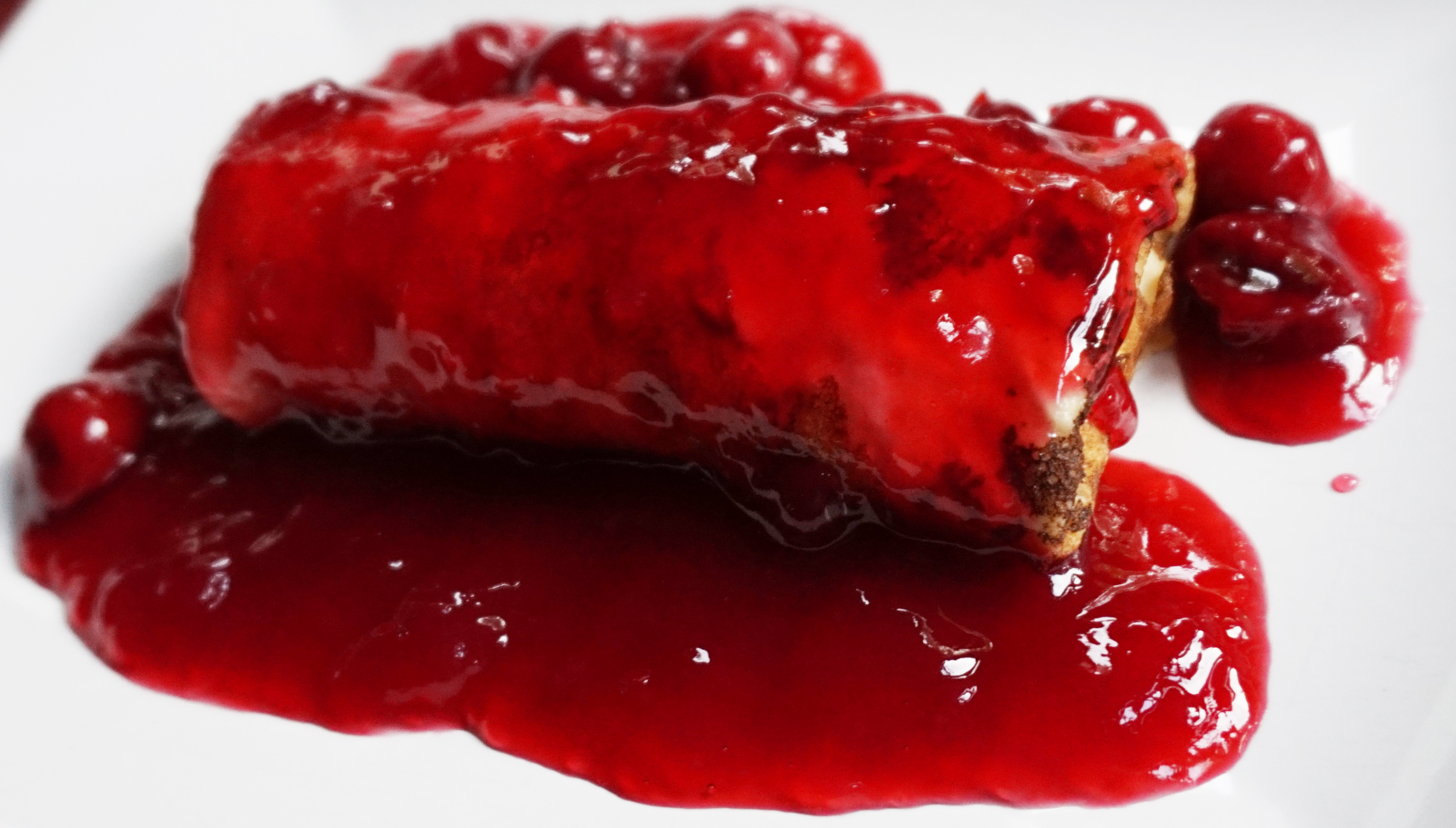
Clătite with jam

The cuisine of Romania has the same influences as the rest of Romanian culture; from Roman times, there still exists the simple pie called, in Romanian, plăcintă and keeping the initial meaning of the Latin word placenta. The Turks brought meatballs (fried mititei or perişoare in a soup called ciorbă); from the Greeks, there is the musaca (moussaka) and covrigi (hot pretzels); from the Bulgarians, a wide variety of vegetable dishes like zacuscă; from the Austrians there is the şniţel (schnitzel); from the Hungarians, their ornate pastries; and the list could go on.

Without a doubt, one of the most popular dishes in Romania, and perhaps can be called the national dish, is Sarmale, or Sarma in other cultures of the Balkans, and the Caucasus; a mixture of pork, beef, and lamb, or just plain pork, with onions and rice, wrapped in semi-sour cabbage or grape leaves, and then placed usually in a porcelain pot with tomato paste and pork cuts. This dish is then slow-cooked, and commonly served with cornmeal (mămăligă, which is a type of polenta). One of the most common meals is the mămăligă, a cornmeal mush, for a long time considered the "poor man's meal" (N-are nici o mămăligă pe masă – "He hasn't even a mămăligă on the table"), but it has become very appreciated in recent times. Pork is the main meat used in Romanian cuisine, but also beef is consumed and a good lamb or fish dish is never to be refused. In conjunction with special events or periods, different recipes are prepared.

During Christmas, nearly every family slaughters a pig and cooks it using a wide variety of traditional recipes like cârnați – a type of long sausage with meat; caltaboși – sausages made with liver and other internal organs; piftie – a jelly made from parts like the feet, head and ears; tochitură (a kind of stew) – served along with mămăligă and wine ("so that the pork can swim"); and tobă (head cheese). The meal is sweetened with the traditional cozonac (sweet bread with nuts, poppy seeds or lokum – rahat in Romanian, known in English as Turkish delight).

Lamb is traditional for Easter; the main dishes are borș de miel (lamb sour soup), roast lamb, and drob – a cooked mix of offal, meat and fresh vegetables, which is quite similar to Scottish haggis, served with pască (a pie made with cottage cheese) as a sweetener.

Wine is the main drink and has been a tradition for over three millennia. Romania is currently the world's ninth-largest wine producer, and exports have increased in recent years. A wide variety of domestic (Grasă, Tămâioasă) and worldwide (Italian Riesling, Merlot, Sauvignon blanc, Cabernet Sauvignon, Chardonnay, Muscat Ottonel) varieties are produced. Romania is the world's second-largest grower of plums, and almost all of those plums become either the famous țuică (a once-refined plum brandy) or palincă (twice-or-more-refined plum brandy). Beer is also highly appreciated, generally blonde pilsener beer, after the German style.

Many proverbs and sayings concern eating, from a child's thank-you for a meal, Săru-mâna pentru masă, c-a fost bună şi gustoasă, și bucătăreasa frumoasa ("Thank you for the meal, it was good and tasty, and the cook was beautiful"), to Mulțumescu-ți ție Doamne, c-am mâncat și iar mi-e foame ("Thank you Lord, for I have eaten, but I am hungry again"), Dragostea trece prin stomac ("Love passes through the stomach"), Pofta vine mâncănd ("Appetite comes while eating"), Porcul mănâncă orice, dar se-ngrașă pentru alții ("The pig would eat anything but it gets fat for others") and Mâncat bine, băut bine, dimineața sculat mort ("Ate well, drank well, in the morning woke up dead").

=== Romanian script ===
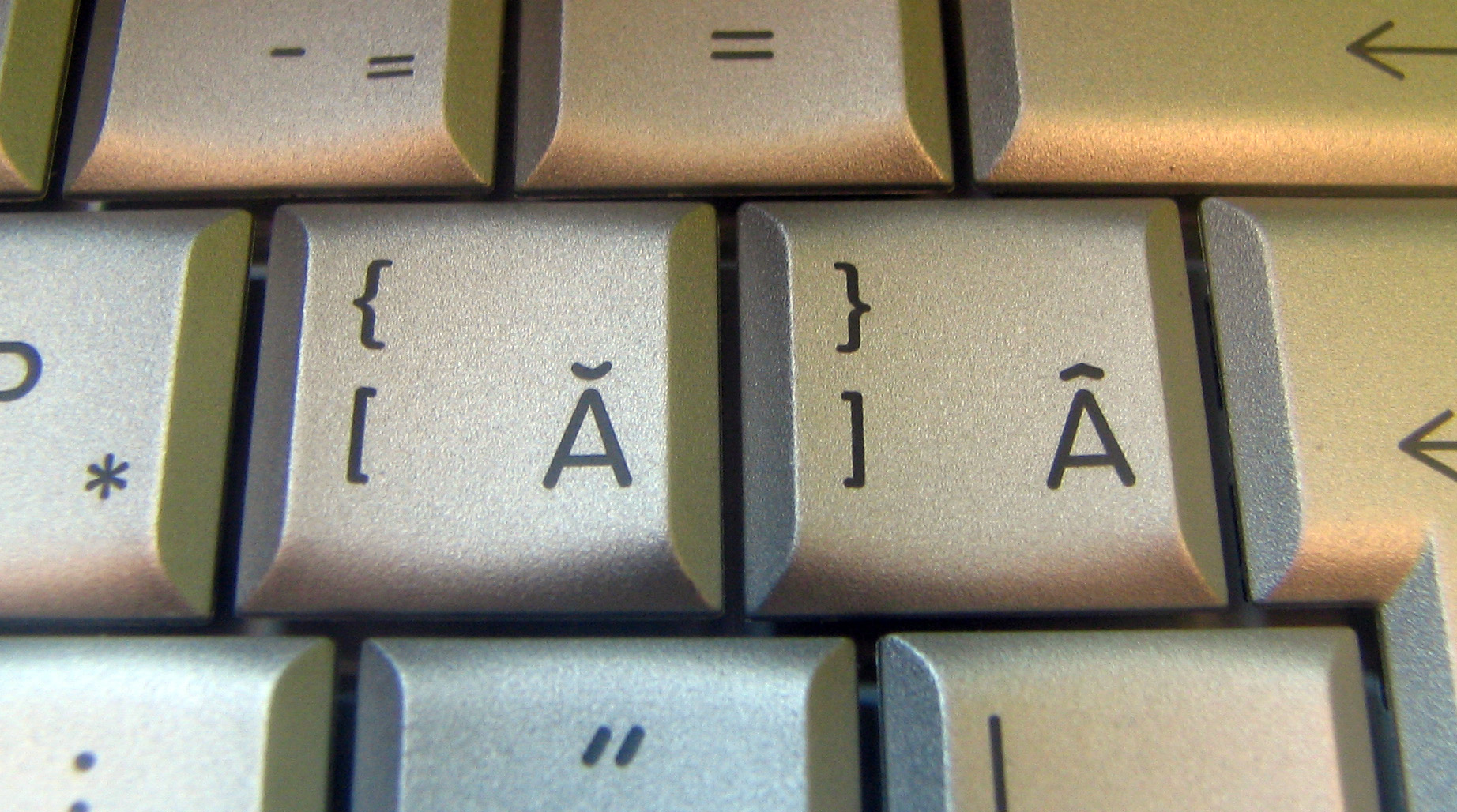
Romanian keyboard with special characters

During the 16th century, Romanian first appeared in writing, usually in religious texts and other written documents. A letter dating from 1521, from Neacșu of Câmpulung to the mayor of Brașov, is considered to be the earliest known text written in Romanian. The letter was written in a script which was used mainly in Wallachia and Moldavia until the year 1859. This script was a version of the Old Church Slavonic alphabet, a version of the Cyrillic alphabet.

A version of the Cyrillic alphabet was used in the Moldavian Soviet Socialist Republic until 1991, when they switched to the Romanian version of the Latin alphabet.

== Contribution of the minorities ==
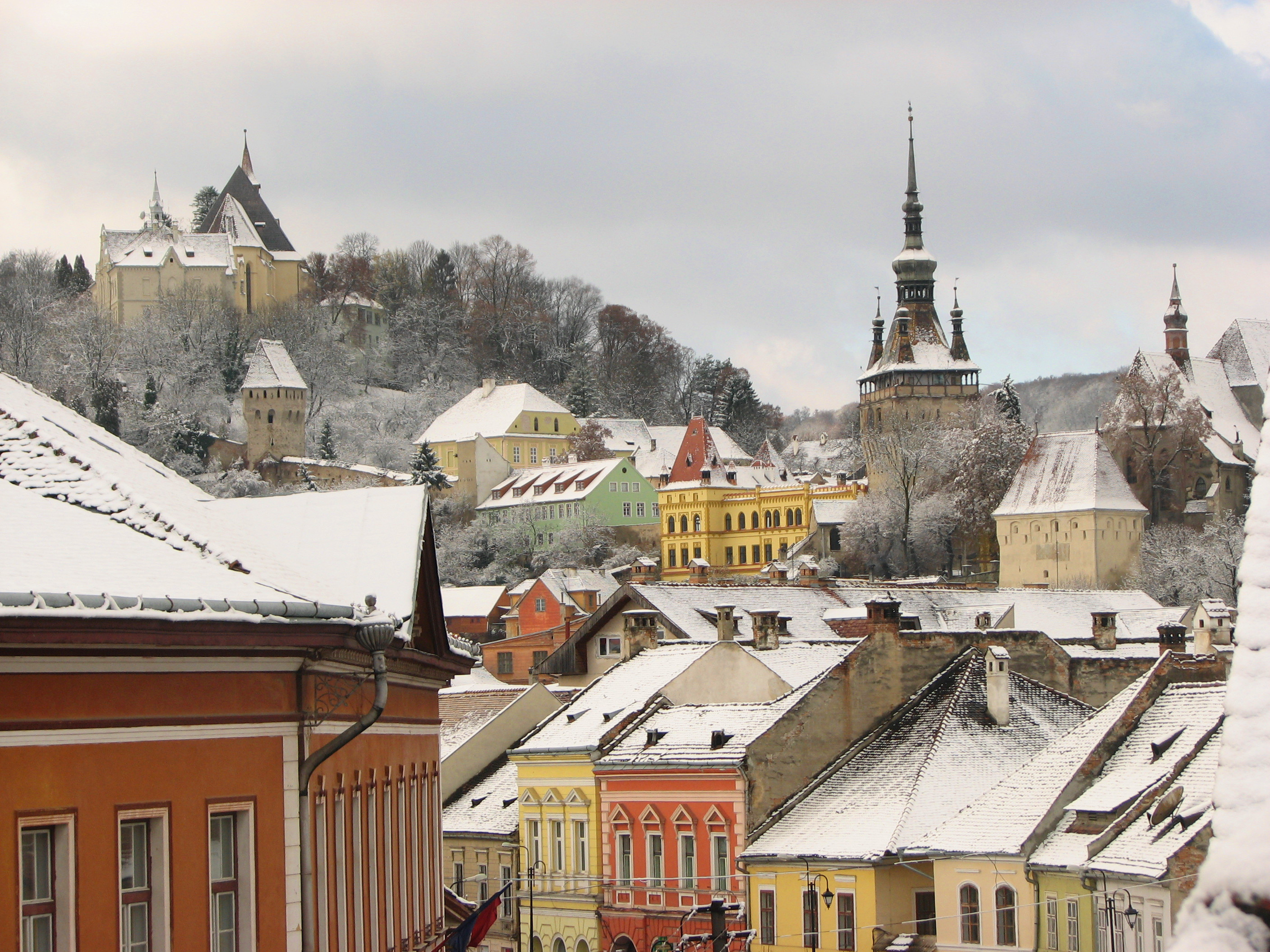
The picturesque medieval Transylvanian Saxon town of Sighișoara (Hungarian: Segesvár, German: Schäßburg)

Minorities have made a major cultural contribution to Romania. Influences came from, most notably, minority groups such as Germans, Greeks, Italians, and Hungarians. The Székely and the Saxons living in Transylvania, Hungarians in the Partium and Banat regions, and the Jasz people and Csángos in Western Moldavia, made many important architectural contributions to the region, including numerous churches, fortifications, and town centers. Also, they figured in some landmarks in the development of ethnic Romanian culture: the first letter written in Romanian was addressed to the mayor of Kronstadt (Romanian: Brașov), and the first book printed in Romanian was in Hermannstadt (Romanian: Sibiu). Romania was once also the cradle of Yiddish theatre, and to this day, Bucharest is home to a State Jewish Theater, despite the small number of Jews remaining in the country.

== Architecture and engineering ==
In the technical domain, one can note the achievements in the field of aviation made by Traian Vuia, Aurel Vlaicu, Aurel Persu, and Henri Coandă and also the works of George Constantinescu in the fields of engineering and sonics. Also, many achievements have been made in the architectural and engineering domain; thus, Bucharest became known as the small Paris. The longest bridge in Europe was constructed by Anghel Saligny, linking Dobruja with the rest of Romania; the Peleș Castle became one of the most beautiful and modern castles in Europe.

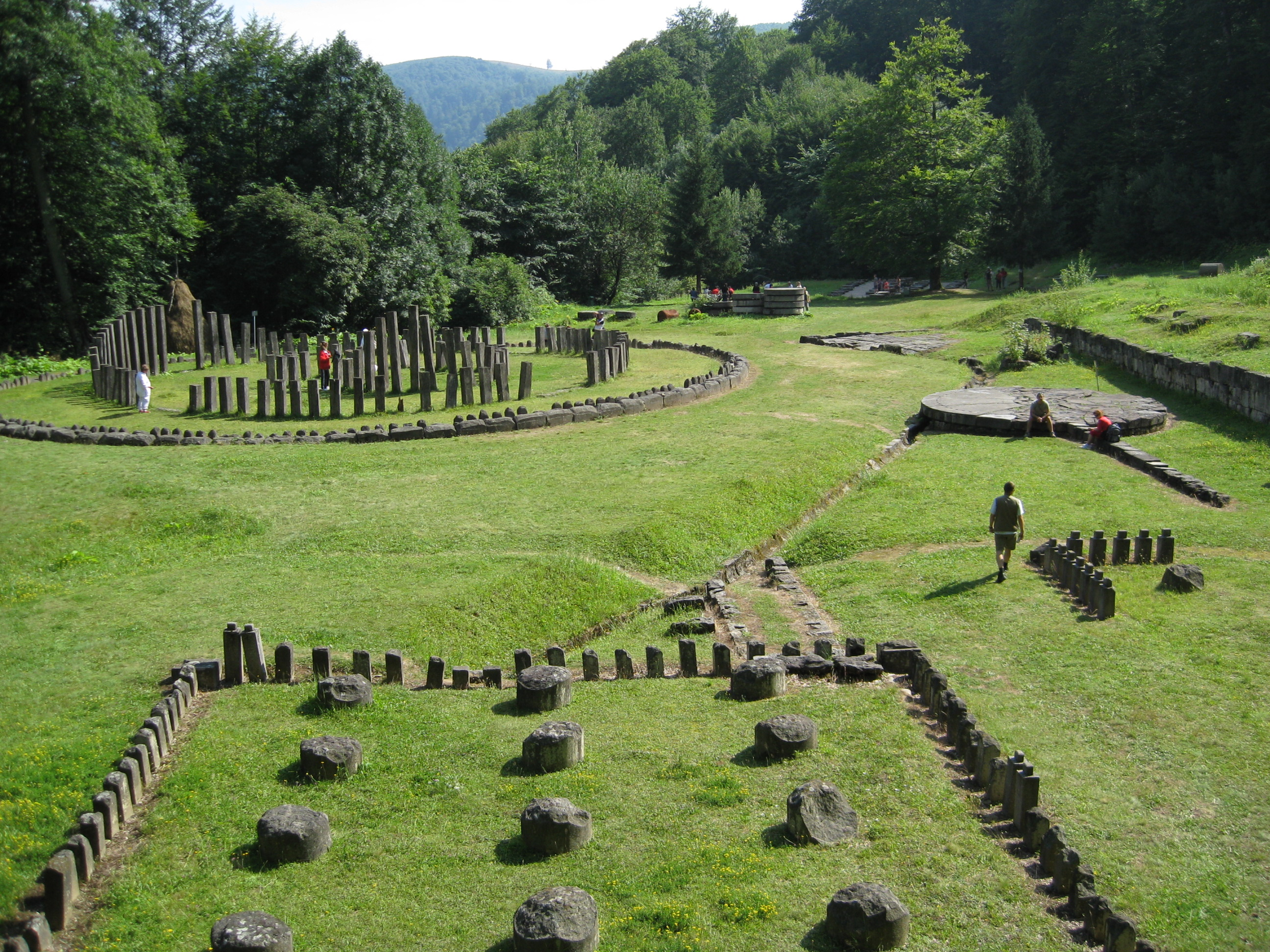
Ancient Dacian ruins at Sarmizegetusa Regia

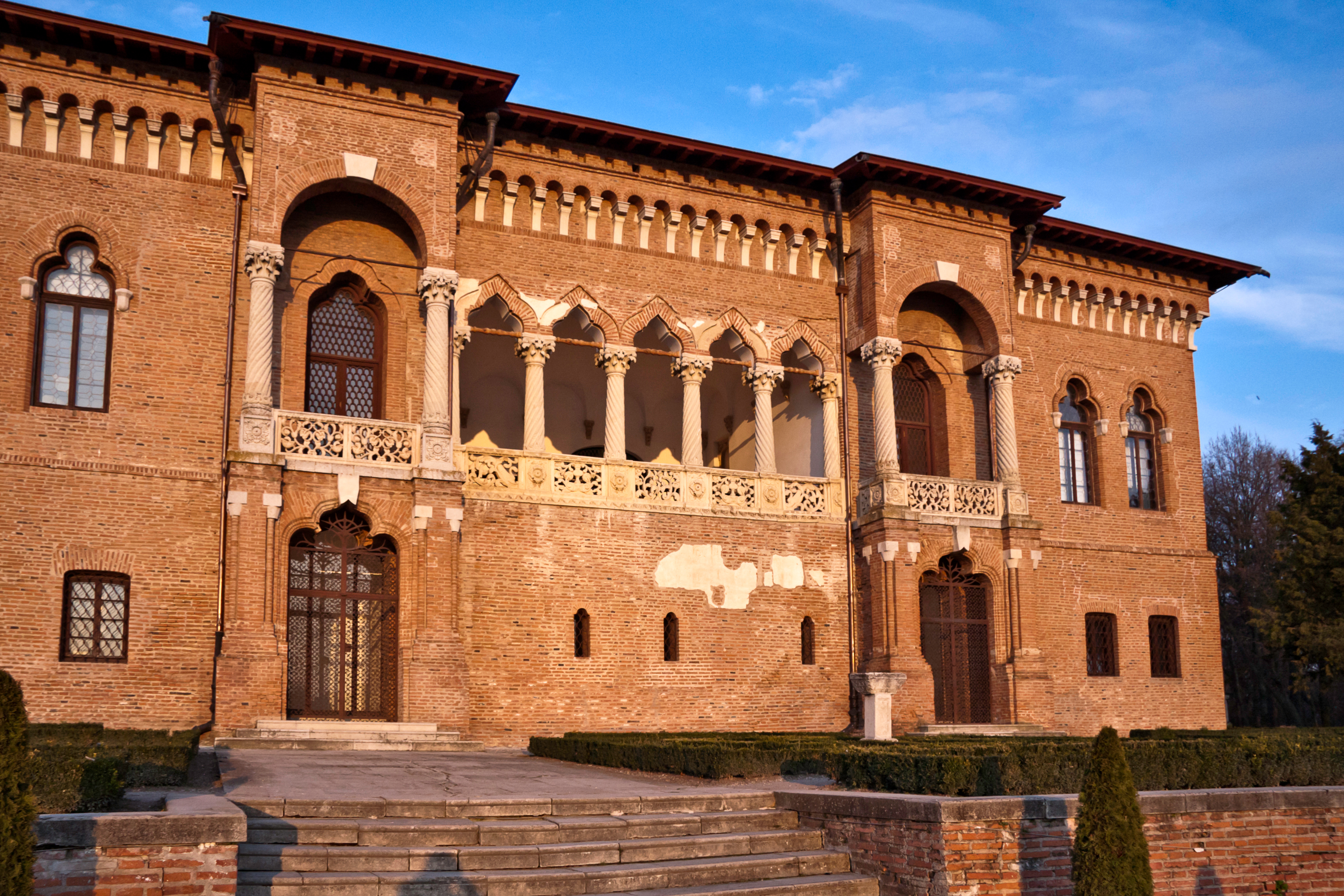
Mogoșoaia Palace, view from the garden

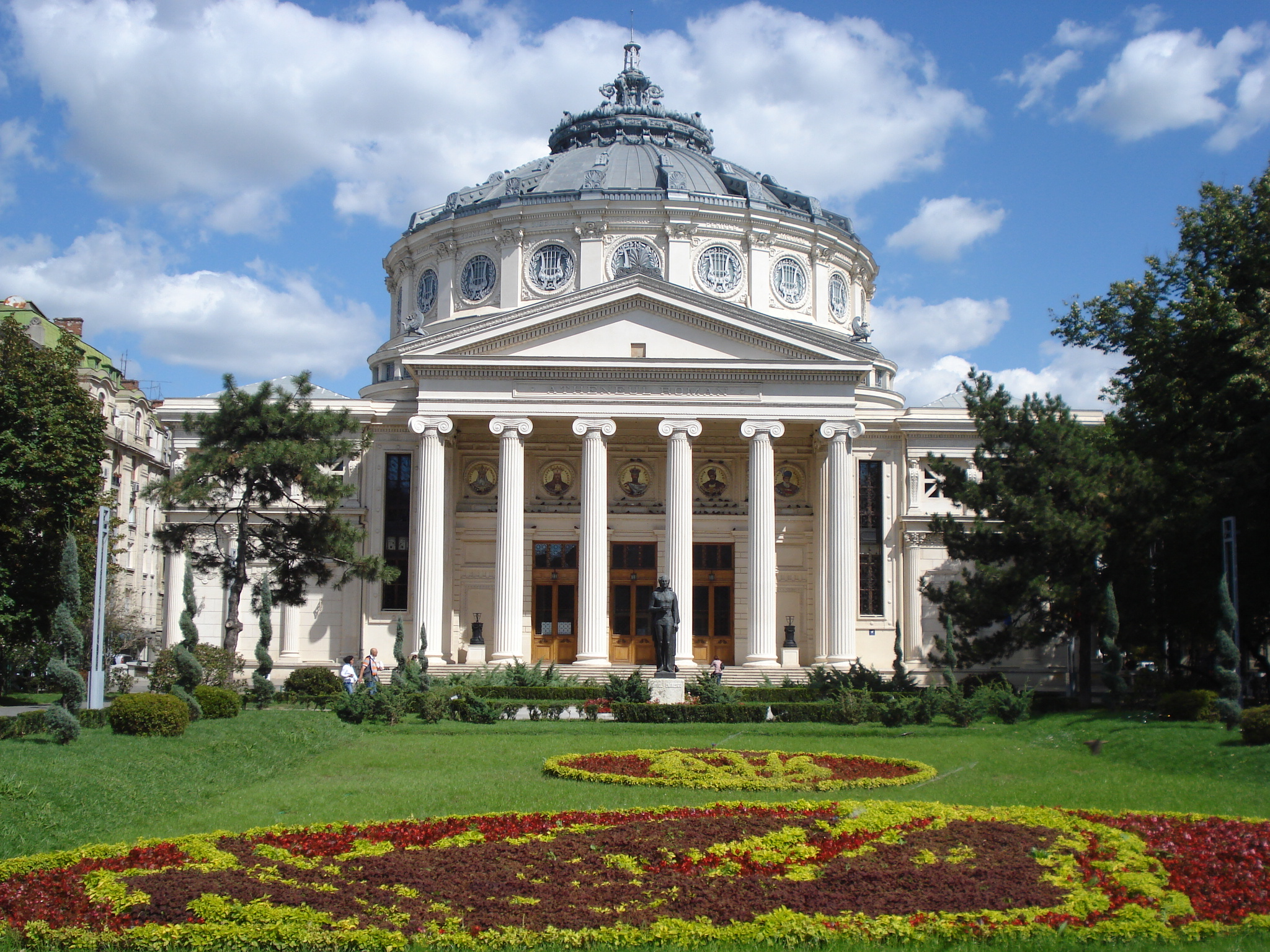
Romanian Athenaeum

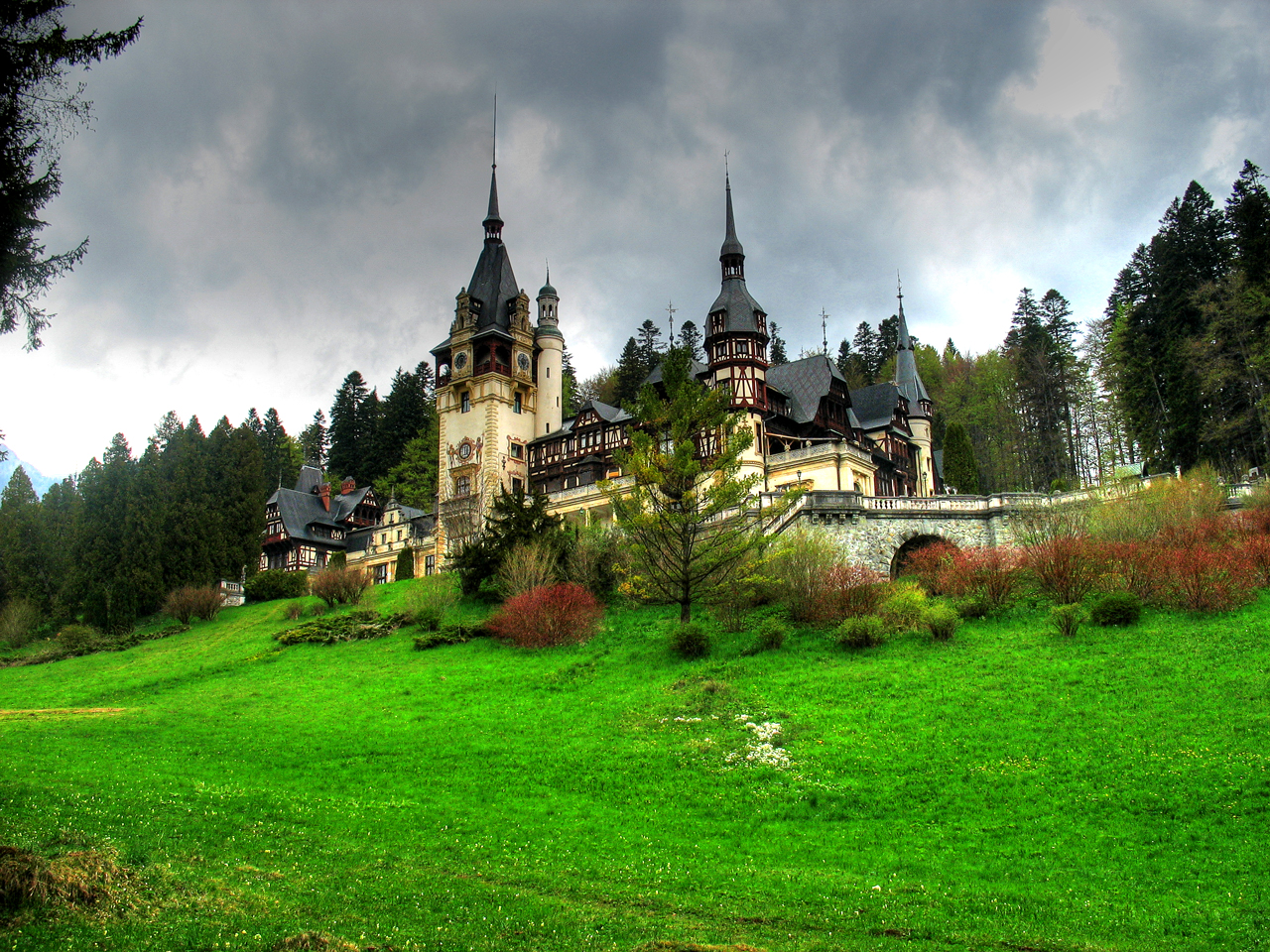
Peleș Castle

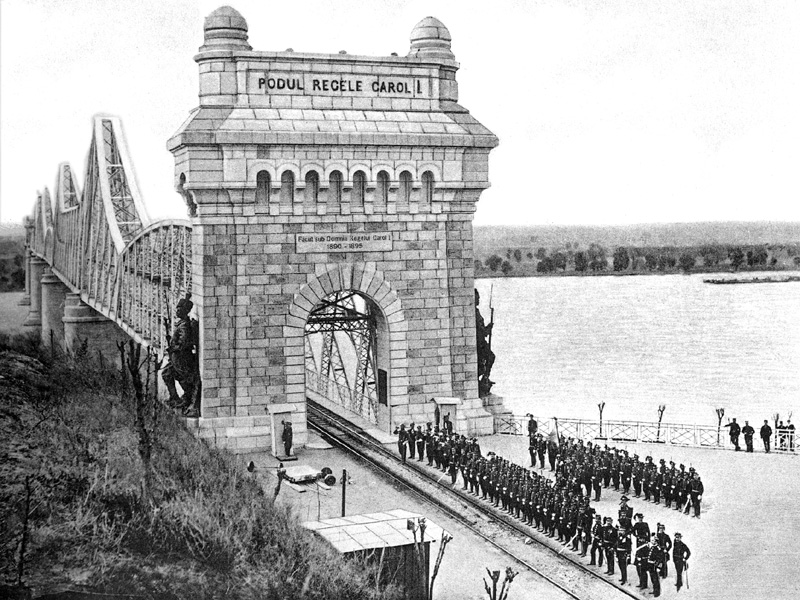
King Carol I bridge

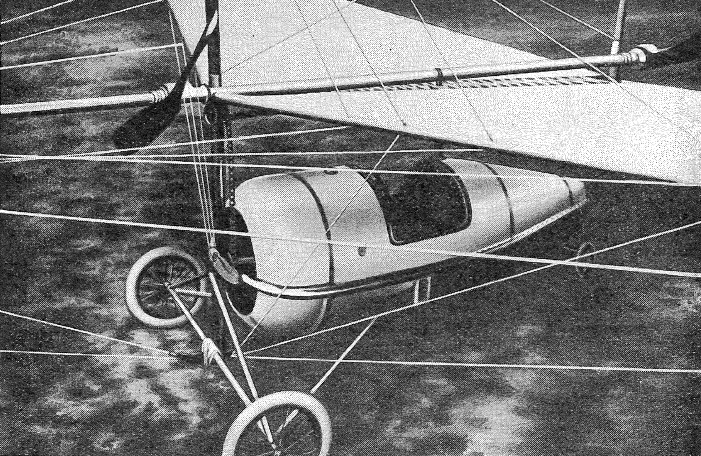
Early airplane model – the A Vlaicu III

== Music ==
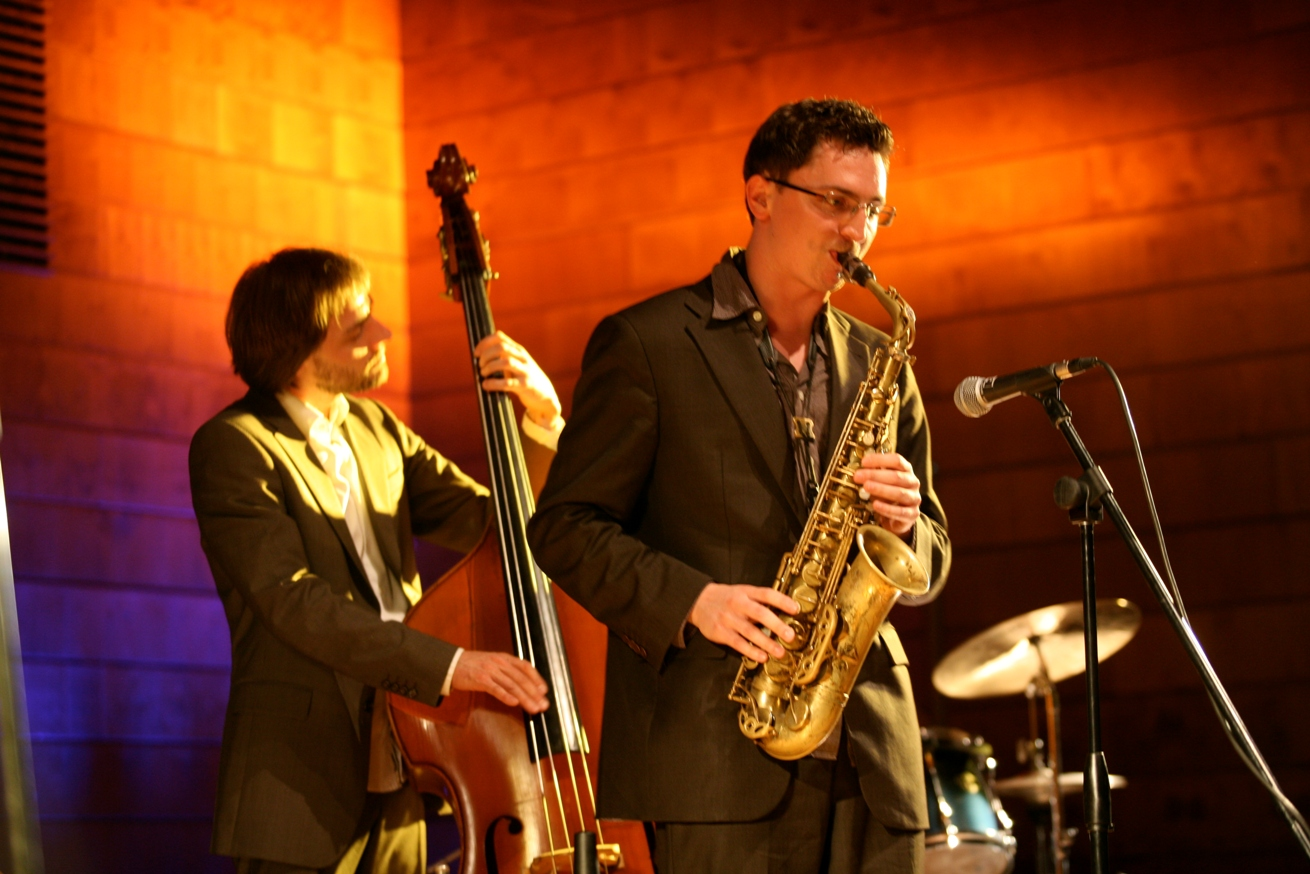
EUROPAfest Jazz festival in Bucharest (2010)

Folk music is the oldest form of Romanian musical creation, characterized by great vitality; it is the defining source of the cultured musical creation, both religious and lay. Conservation of Romanian folk music has been aided by a large and enduring audience, and by numerous performers who helped propagate and further develop the folk sound. Two of them, Vasile Pandelescu, and Dumnitru Zamfira are some of the most famous examples of Romanian folk musicians.

Before the major incorporation of more modern instruments that found their way into Romanian folk music, older instruments such as the Tobă (double-headed drum, also known as the Tabul or Davul), Surlă (also known as the Zurna in other parts of the Balkans), Caval (ancient shepherd's pipe), Cobza (an ancient instrument related to the Arabic Oud), Vioară (violin), Cimpoi (Balkan bagpipe), and the Tamburină (tambourine, more commonly used during the times under Phanariote and Ottoman influence), were also commonly used in folk music before the introduction on some slightly more modern elements such as the widely used accordion, and clarinet. Folk music, often is accentuated with clapping, yells of tongue rolling, shouts, and whistles.

The religious musical creation, born under the influence of Byzantine music adjusted to the intonations of the local folk music, saw a period of glory between the 15th-17th centuries, when reputed schools of liturgical music developed within Romanian monasteries. Russian and Western influences brought about the introduction of polyphony in religious music in the 18th century, a genre developed by a series of Romanian composers in the 19th and 20th centuries.

Manele is the most popular genre in Romania.

== See also ==
- Languages of Romania
- Literature of Romania
- Architecture of Romania
- Cinema of Romania
- Famous Romanian people
- List of libraries in Romania
- Romanian humour
- Byzantium after Byzantium, a cultural movement which sprung during the medieval Romanian history.
- Sport in Romania
- Culture of Moldova
