= Deleni =

Deleni may refer to several places in Romania:

- Deleni, Constanța
- Deleni, Iași
- Deleni, Vaslui
- Deleni, a village in Helegiu Commune, Bacău County
- Deleni, a village in Scorțoasa Commune, Buzău County
- Deleni, a village in Petreștii de Jos Commune, Cluj County
- Deleni, a village in Șimnicu de Sus Commune, Dolj County
- Deleni, a village in Plopșoru Commune, Gorj County
- Deleni, a village in Zam Commune, Hunedoara County
- Deleni, a village in Ciortești Commune, Iași County
- Deleni, a village in Breznița-Motru Commune, Mehedinţi County
- Deleni, a village in Băgaciu Commune, Mureș County
- Deleni, a village in Ideciu de Jos Commune, Mureș County
- Deleni, a village in Pogăceaua Commune, Mureș County
- Deleni, a village in Ștefan cel Mare Commune, Neamț County
- Deleni, a village in Teslui Commune, Olt County
- Deleni, a village in Dobrin Commune, Sălaj County
- Deleni, a village in Pârteștii de Jos Commune, Suceava County
- Deleni, a village in Hoceni Commune, Vaslui County
- Deleni, a village in Stoenești Commune, Vâlcea County

Rivers in Romania:

- Deleni (Mureș), a tributary of the Mureș in Mureș County
- Deleni, a tributary of the Slănic in Buzău County
- Deleni, a tributary of the Valea Baciului in Constanța County

== See also ==
- Dealu (disambiguation)
- Delureni (disambiguation)
- Deleanu (surname)
