= Gabriel Liiceanu =

Romanian philosopher

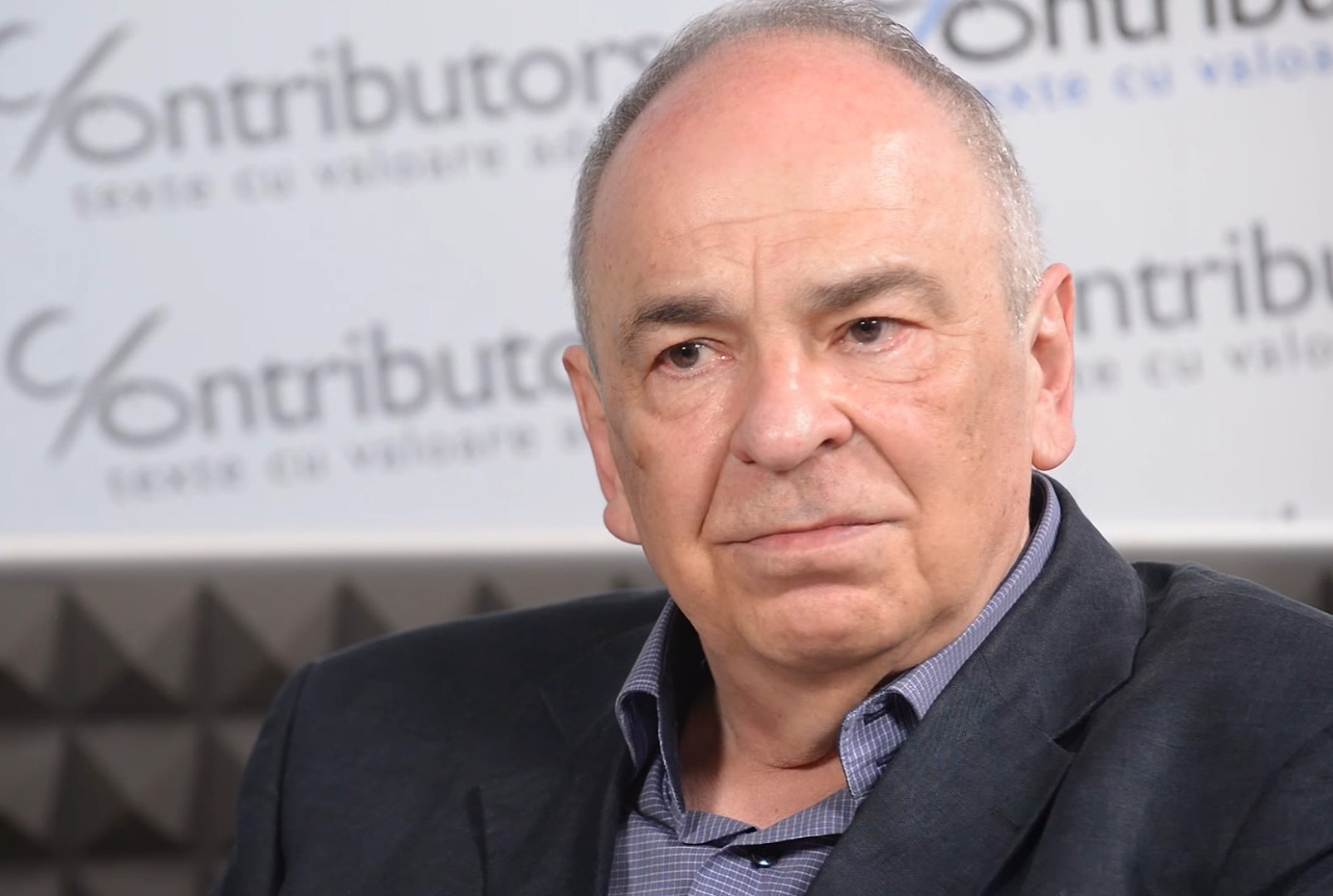
Gabriel Liiceanu

Gabriel Liiceanu (Romanian pronunciation: [ɡabriˈel li.iˈt͡ʃe̯anu]; b. May 23, 1942, Râmnicu Vâlcea) is a Romanian philosopher.

He graduated from the University of Bucharest's Faculty of Philosophy in 1965, and from Faculty of Classical Languages in 1973. He earned a doctorate in philosophy at the University of Bucharest in 1976. Between 1965 and 1975, Liiceanu was a researcher at the Institute of Philosophy, and between 1975 and 1989 at the Institute of Art History. He received a fellowship from the Humboldt Foundation between 1982 and 1984.

He has been the manager of Humanitas publishing house since 1990. He has been professor at the University of Bucharest's Faculty of Philosophy since 1992. Liiceanu is also a founding member of the Group for Social Dialogue (1990), president of the Romanian Publishers' Association (since 2000), and member of the scientific council of New Europe College. Between 1998 and 2001, he was a member of the Romanian National Television's Administrative Board.

He was greatly influenced by his mentor, Constantin Noica, especially during the time spent at Păltiniș, an experience that he evokes in "Jurnalul de la Păltiniș" ("The Păltiniș Diary"). Noica, a Romanian philosopher known abroad as well as in the country, used to take his most valuable students and followers to his small house at Păltiniș, where he would teach them what they afterwards called "not philosophy lessons, but spiritual experiences". Another Noica follower who was invited to Păltiniș was Andrei Pleșu (Liiceanu and Pleșu are still friends today). Liiceanu refers to that experience in his books as the "Păltiniș School" and the term began to be widely accepted and used in Romanian, as well as European, philosophy. Liiceanu continued to publish well into the 2000s, and he remains a mainstream figure in Romanian intellectual public life, with close connections with Andrei Pleșu, Monica Lovinescu, and Virgil Ierunca. One critic, Gabriel Andreescu, suggested that Liiceanu allegedly facilitated extremism by allowing his publishing house to edit the works of inter-war (Communist-persecuted) Romanian figures whom Andreescu accused of being "ideologues of right-wing extremism".

== Work ==
=== Books ===
- Tragicul. O fenomenologie a limitei și depășirii (The Tragic - A Phenomenology of limit and overtaking), 1975
- Încercare în politropia omului și a culturii (Essay on the polytropy of man and culture), 1981
- Jurnalul de la Păltiniș. Un model paideic în cultura umanistă (The Paltiniş Diary: A Paideic Model in Humanist Culture), 1983
- Le Journal de Păltiniș, La Decouverte, Paris, 1998
- Paltiniș Diary, CEU Press, Budapest and New York, 2000
- Epistolar (Epistolary), 1987, coauthor and editor
- Apel către lichele (Appeal to knaves), 1992
- Cearta cu filozofia. Eseuri (Quarrel with philosophy. Essays), 1992
- Despre limită (On limit), 1994
- De la limite, Ed. Michalon, Paris, 1997
- Itinerariile unei vieţi: EM. Cioran urmat de Apocalipsa după Cioran. Trei zile de convorbiri - 1990, 1995
- Itineraires d'une vie: E.M. Cioran suivi de Les Continents de l'insomnie, Ed. Michalon, Paris, 1995
- Apocalypsen enligt Cioran, Dualis Forlags, Ludvika, Suedia, 1997
- Declarație de iubire (Love declaration), 2001
- Ușa interzisă (The Forbidden door), 2002
- Om și simbol. Interpretări ale simbolului în teoria artei și filozofia culturii (Man and Symbol. Interpretations of the symbol in art theory and culture philosophy), 2005
- Despre minciună (On lie), 2006
- Despre ură (On hate), 2007
- Scrisori către fiul meu, 2008
- Întâlnire cu un necunoscut, 2010
- Întâlnire în jurul unei palme Zen, 2011
- Meeting with a Stranger

His books are currently being published in Brazil by Editora Monergismo.

=== Translations ===
From Greek and German:

- Plato, Aristotelic commentators, German philosophers (Martin Heidegger, Schelling)

=== Movies ===
- Exercițiu de admirație (Exercise of Admiration), 1991, with Constantin Chelba (coauthor)
- interview with Eugène Ionesco, 1992
- Apocalipsa după Cioran (Apocalypse according to Cioran), 1995, with Sorin Ilieșiu (coauthor)

=== Audiobooks ===
- Ușa interzisă (The Forbidden Door), 2003
- Noica, 2003, with Andrei Pleșu (coauthor)
- Apel către lichele (Appeal to knaves), 2006
- Declaraţie de iubire (Love declaration), 2006
- Sebastian, mon frère. Scrisoare către un frate mai mare (Sebastian, mon frère. Letter to an elder brother), 2006
- Strategii ale seducţiei. De la Romeo și Julieta la sărutul cioranian (Strategies of seduction. From Romeo and Juliet to Cioranian kiss), 2006

== Awards ==
- Romanian Writers' Union Prize, 1983, for Păltiniș Diary
- Chevalier de l'Ordre des Arts et des Lettres, 1992
- Great Prize of the Romanian Film-makers Union, 1992, ex-aequo, for Exercise of Admiration
- Cross of Merit, First class, of the Order of Merit of the Federal Republic of Germany, 2006, for promotion of German language and culture in Romania
- Knight of the Order of the Star of Romania, 2006
