= Zigu Ornea =

Romanian historian, literary critic, biographer and publisher (1930 – 2001)

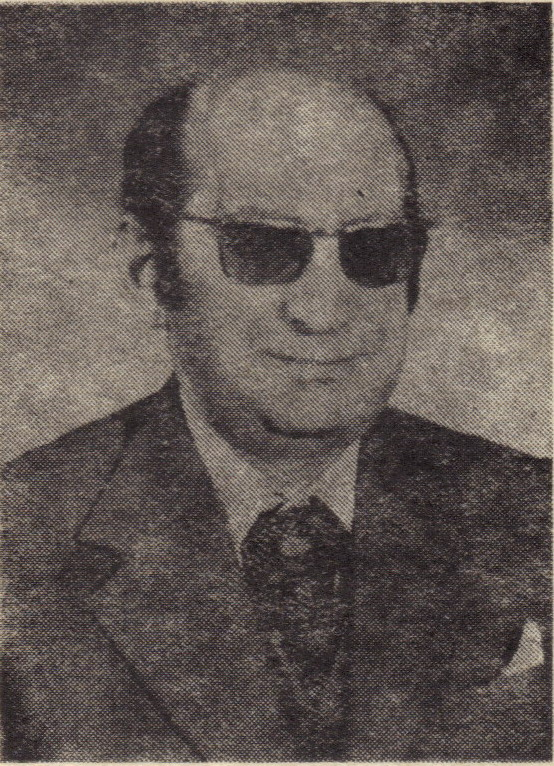
- Born: August 28, 1930; Frumușica, Botoșani County, Kingdom of Romania
- Died: November 14, 2001 (aged 71); Bucharest, Romania
- Other names: Zigu Orenstein, Zigu Ornstein

Academic background
- Influences: Karl Kautsky, Eugen Lovinescu, Tudor Vianu, Ștefan Zeletin

Academic work
- Era: 20th century
- School or tradition: Marxist, Classical liberal, Romanian liberal
- Main interests: Historiography, literary criticism, Romanian cultural history, sociology
- Notable works: Junimismul (1966); Sămănătorismul (1970); Poporanismul (1972); Junimea și junimismul (1975); Curentul cultural de la Contemporanul (1977); Tradiționalism și modernitate în deceniul al treilea (1980); Anii treizeci. Extrema dreaptă românească (1995)
- Influenced: Sorin Alexandrescu, Marta Petreu, Ana Selejan, Florin Țurcanu

Zigu Ornea (Romanian: [ˈziɡu ˈorne̯a]; born Zigu Orenstein or Ornstein and commonly known as Z. Ornea; August 28, 1930 – November 14, 2001) was a Romanian cultural historian, literary critic, biographer and book publisher. The author of several monographs focusing on the evolution of Romanian culture in general and Romanian literature in particular, he chronicled the debates and meeting points between conservatism, nationalism, and socialism. His main early works are primarily dedicated to the 19th and early 20th century cultural and political currents heralded by Junimea, by the left-wing ideologues of Poporanism and by the Sămănătorul circle, followed independently or in relation to one another. Written as expansions of this study were Ornea's biographical essays on some of the period's leading theorists: Titu Maiorescu, Constantin Dobrogeanu-Gherea and Constantin Stere.

Ornea, who spent much of his career under the communist regime, began by following a dissenting form of Marxism, objecting to the official censorship of writers viewed as "reactionary" and later to the emerging forms of national communism. Noted for his defense of Western culture in front of the isolationism advocated under the rule of Nicolae Ceaușescu, the researcher also acquired a familiarity with the various aspects socialist history which led him to abandon Marxist ideology. After the Revolution of 1989, he dedicated his final and groundbreaking study to exposing the cultural connections of far right and fascism in interwar Greater Romania.

In parallel to his work in the study of Romanian cultural history, Zigu Ornea was a noted publisher, who held positions of leadership at Editura Meridiane and Editura Minerva, before becoming founder and director of Editura Hasefer. He had a vast activity as a literary chronicler and essayist, holding permanent columns in România Literară and Dilema Veche magazines during the final decades of his life. Zigu Ornea was the father of mathematician and essayist Liviu Ornea.

== Biography ==
=== Early life ===
Born in Frumușica, a village of Botoșani County, the future writer belonged to the Jewish Romanian community. His father was a cattle trader, and Ornea often helped in the family business by tending to the animals (an experience which left him with fond memories). He was a cousin of Romanian-born Israeli writer Mariana Juster, who later left details on their early life. According to her account, Ornea spent the years before World War II in his native village, until all Jews in the nation's rural areas were expelled with the acquiescence of the antisemitic regime of Conducător Ion Antonescu, and thereafter forced to wear the yellow badge (see Holocaust in Romania). He subsequently settled in the ghetto of Botoșani city, where he lived in poverty and isolation, spending some of the money he had left on adventure novels, and ultimately set up a small clandestine business dealing in humming tops. The Police representative shut down the enterprise, on the basis of legislation which prevented Jews from owning firms, and Ornea is said to have narrowly escaped further repercussion by bribing him with tobacco.

Upon the end of the war, Ornea resumed his studies and graduated high school, during which time he became an avid follower of historical debates animating the Romanian cultural scene during the previous century. As he himself recalled, his readings of the time included the works of classical literary theorists such as the conservative Titu Maiorescu and the socialist Constantin Dobrogeanu-Gherea, as well as the complete collections of some of Romania's leading literary periodicals (Convorbiri Literare, Viața Românească). His outstanding passion for reading was later documented by several of his colleagues in the literary and scientific world, and made Ornea notorious in his professional environment.

A student at the University of Bucharest's Faculty of Philosophy between 1951 and 1955, Ornea was, according to his colleague and future philosopher Cornel Popa, one of those who would not accept the strict interpretation of human endeavor as fostered by official Marxism-Leninism, seeking to inform himself on classical subjects directly from the sources. Popa stated that Ornea, himself and others (future academics Mircea Flonta, Ilie Pârvu, Vasile Tonoiu etc.) were in search of "fresh air" and "could not bear to have our thinking entrapped." Ornea was at the time close to University professor Tudor Vianu, who, as he recalled, became one of his mentors. For the following thirty years, he adopted a Marxist perspective, but one largely differing from the official line, before altogether parting with the ideology. After graduation, Ornea began his career with Editura de stat pentru literatură și artă (ESPLA), a state-run publishing house based in Bucharest. During the same period, he married Ada Ornea, who gave birth to their son Liviu.

=== Cultural debates under communism ===
Viewed with some suspicion by the communist authorities, Zigu Ornea was progressively marginalized during the late 1950s. He was expelled from ESLPA at the same time as art historian and critic Dan Grigorescu, both of them for having "bourgeois" origins. According to his friend, publisher Tiberiu Avramescu, Ornea felt himself being pressured by the regime's representatives into leaving for Israel, but rejected the notion and argued: "I shan't give up, this is my country." Speaking later about "latent antisemitism" and forms of "aggressive intolerance" in postwar Romania, the literary historian noted: "being born a Jew was not a detail in my case, but [...] a state and a permanent wound that I have been feeling acutely, ceaselessly".

After being eventually readmitted into publishing, Ornea spent the rest of the communist period working as reviewer for Meridiane and ultimately for Minerva. Beginning in the late 1960s, during a liberalization period coinciding with early years of communist leader Nicolae Ceaușescu, Ornea dedicated his work to the study of cultural and political phenomena of the 19th and early 20th century. Published in 1966, his first book was dedicated to the conservative literary society Junimea and its ideology (Junimismul, Editura pentru literatură, 1966), followed the same year by his contribution to a monograph on the Utopian socialism of Teodor Diamant (Falansterul de la Scăieni, "The Phalanstère of Scăeni", Editura Politică). He followed up with the 1968 volume Trei esteticieni ("Three Aestheticians", Editura pentru literatură) and a 1969 overview of interwar ideology, dedicated to the tenets of the National Peasants' Party (Țărănismul, "Peasantism", Editura Politică). Also in the late 1960s, he published commentary on the diverse works of Junimist historian A. D. Xenopol, and, together with N. Gogoneață, contributed to a critical edition of Xenopol's contributions. He also edited a 1968 anthology from the works of Henric Sanielevici, a maverick exponent of Marxist criticism who was also noted for his attempt to classify literature around racialist criteria.

In 1970 and 1972 respectively, Minerva published his studies on the ideology of the traditionalist review Sămănătorul (titled Sămănătorismul) and its leftist competitor Poporanism (Poporanismul). Also in 1972, Ornea inaugurated his collaboration with Editura Eminescu, publishing Studii și cercetări ("Studies and Investigations"), followed in 1975 by the first edition of his Junimea și junimismul ("Junimea and Junimism"), and in 1976 by Confluențe ("Confluences"). It later published his historical overview of the socialist literary circle formed around Contemporanul magazine (Curentul cultural de la Contemporanul, "The Cultural Current of Contemporanul", 1977), his study on later developments of Romanian traditionalism (Tradiționalism și modernitate în deceniul al treilea, "Tradition and Modernity in the 1920s", 1980), and his collected Comentarii ("Commentaries", 1981). His work at Minerva included an edition of Istoria civilizației române moderne ("The History of Modern Romanian Civilization") by Eugen Lovinescu, an interwar cultural historian, modernist writer and classical liberal theorist (the reprint included Ornea's own introductory study on Lovinescu's ideology). In tandem, his Junimea și junimismul went through a second edition, published in 1978. In parallel, Ornea was publishing the selected works of Poporanist theorist Constantin Stere, and reediting the complete literary tracts of conservative historian Nicolae Iorga.

With the tightening of the Ceaușescu regime's control on media and the literary environment, coupled with the ideological recuperation of national communism and isolationism (the July Theses), Ornea joined the intellectual faction attempting to circumvent censorship and promote a more nuanced take on cultural history. Ornea bowed down to the requirements in at least one instance: his Lovinescu edition was published without some portions of text that the regime found unpalatable, and the introductory note purported that Lovinescu had points in common with historical materialism. According to historian Lucian Boia, the method was objectionable, but also the only way in which the book could see print. Communist censorship also intervened in Ornea's work as anthologist: as researcher Victor Durnea notes, his Constantin Stere edition only covered the early portion of Stere's career, detailing his loose affiliation with the socialist movement.

In this context, Ornea came to be regarded with suspicion by the establishment. His views were criticized by the nationalist magazine Săptămîna, whose contributor Constantin Sorescu depicted him as a "dogmatist" of Marxism. In 1974–1975, Ornea's name was invoked by high-ranking Romanian Communist Party activists such as Ion Dodu Bălan in a matter involving the censorship of literary historian Gelu Ionescu. Ionescu had intended to publish Anatomia unei negații ("The Anatomy of a Negation"), a book about the self-exiled writer Eugène Ionesco (whose own work had only been selectively published at home); the volume was positively reviewed for publication by Ornea and various of his colleagues (Ion Ianoși and Paul Cornea among them), but was rejected by both Dodu Bălan and novelist Marin Preda, who cited Eugène Ionesco's anti-communist views. As a result, Ornea was pressured into submitting a "self-criticism" statement. In a 2000 interview, Ornea recalled that the Ceaușescu years had brought renewed pressures for him to leave the country for Israel: "I constantly enjoyed the friendship of Romanian and Jewish democratic writers, which provided me with resilience and courage. It was extremely annoying for the Ceaușist nationalists that, as a Jew, I would not leave for Israel and would refuse to do so. [...] And I'll only leave the country if expelled."

The next focus of Ornea's research was the life and career of maverick Marxist thinker and Poporanist founding figure Dobrogeanu-Gherea. This was the topic of two separate books, both published by Cartea Românească: Viața lui C. Dobrogeanu-Gherea ("The Life of C. Dobrogeanu-Gherea", 1982) and Opera lui Constantin Dobrogeanu-Gherea ("The Work of C. Dobrogeanu-Gherea", 1983). At this stage in his career, Ornea also coordinated Minerva's collection of integral editions from Romanian literature, Scriitori români ("Romanian Writers").

While two other volumes of his essays on literary subjects were published by Editura Eminescu (Actualitatea clasicilor, "The Timelessness of the Classics", in 1985; Interpretări, "Interpretations", in 1988), Ornea followed up with two Cartea Românească volumes on Junimist doyen Maiorescu (Viața lui Titu Maiorescu, "The Life of Titu Maiorescu", 1986 and 1987). In 1989, Cartea Românească also published the first section of his monograph on Constantin Stere (Viața lui C. Stere, "The Life of C. Stere"). He was by then a regular contributor to the Writers' Union main organ, the magazine România Literară, where he was assigned a weekly column.

=== Final years ===
Zigu Ornea diversified his activity after the December 1989 Revolution toppled communism. Shortly after these events, Ornea, together with writer Radu Cosașu, art critic Andrei Pleșu and journalist Tita Chiper, founded the cultural weekly Dilema, the immediate precursor for what later became Dilema Veche. The new publication hosted another column signed by Ornea, which he contributed in parallel to his România Literară chronicle. Publishing the second volume of his Viața lui C. Stere (1991), he worked for Minerva until its bankruptcy, after which he was head of department at Minerva and Editura Fundației Culturale Române, as well as co-founder and executive director for the Jewish community's publishing organization, Editura Hasefer. He was also a member of the executive council for the Federation of Jewish Communities of Romania, one of the ethnic minority representative bodies.

Having published a 1994 collection of essays with Minerva (Înțelesuri, "Meanings"), Ornea centered his research on the interwar far right, fascist or Nazi-inspired political movements, publishing with Editura Fundației Culturale Române his Anii treizeci. Extrema dreaptă românească (title translated as The Thirties: The Far Right in Romania). His other anthumous works include a 1995 revised edition of Junimea și junimismul and a series of new volumes of essays: Fizionomii ("Physiognomies", Editura Nemira, 1997), Medalioane ("Medallions", Institutul European, 1998), Portrete ("Portraits", Minerva, 1999) and Polifonii ("Poliphonies", Polirom, 2001).

Progressively immobilized by osteoarthritis, Zigu Ornea is said to have exhausted himself with his continuous literary work. He died in 2001, after failed surgery on his kidneys, and was buried in the Botoșani Jewish Cemetery. He had authored his literary columns months in advance, and the magazine was able to publish contributions of his for the several weeks after his death. In addition to his unpublished Însemnări ("Records"), comprising his notes on everyday events, Ornea is said to have been planning a history of Romanian politics after World War II and a monograph dedicated to the "Jewish question" as understood locally.

His final work, Glose despre altădată ("Glosses on Yesteryear"), was published inside a commemorative 2002 volume edited by critic Geo Șerban and Hasefer (Zigu Ornea. Permanența cărturarului, "Zigu Ornea. The Man of Letters as Permanence"). In 2004, Hasefer also issued an edition of his other last texts, as Medalioane de istorie literară ("Medallions in Literary History", edited by his former colleague Tiberiu Avramescu). It was followed in 2006 by a reprint of Viața lui C. Stere, with Editura Compania, and in 2009 by a new edition of Anii treizeci..., with the Romanian-based company Samuel Tastet Editeur. The latter also had an English-language edition, published in the United States as a Columbia University Press monograph (1999). In 2006, the 5th commemoration of Ornea's death was marked by an official ceremony, hosted by the Bucharest Museum of Literature.

== Work ==
=== Stylistic traits and cultural context ===
Zigu Ornea's contribution to historiographic research and critical study was viewed with much interest by his colleagues, and often earned him high praise. Writer Augustin Buzura called him "a great historian" and "an encyclopédiste", while Jewish community leader Nicolae Cajal defined him as "a Wise Man" whose interest touched "everything that brought intelligence in a person or in a book." Likewise, poet and art historian Pavel Șușară viewed Ornea's works as both "dauntingly" voluminous and impressive from the point of view of research, noting that they produced "one of the most fascinating webs of facts, ideologies, doctrines, adventures and historical dramas." Literary critic Ion Simuț primarily noted his colleague's contribution to "criticism of ideas", alongside his philological enterprises and his work as editor and publisher, arguing that they provided Ornea with a global perspective on Romanian culture. Simuț also ranks Ornea, whose weekly literary chronicles he describes as marked by "seriousness, thoroughness and consistency", among "an elite category" of literary historians, placing him alongside Ion Bălu, Paul Cornea, Dan Mănucă, Al. Săndulescu, Mircea Zaciu and "some, not many, others." Writing in 2001, his colleague Mircea Iorgulescu also assessed: "Z. Ornea was incapable of fanaticism, irrational stubbornness and deliriums, and his enormous, but never ostentatious, knowledge of written culture had not rendered him haughty. [...] His works [...] are fundamental for understanding modern Romania. Their vastness was amazing to the point of the unbelievable, and this was decades ago." Literary critic Marius Chivu defined Ornea as "the historian who knew everything about everyone who ever wrote one page of literature."

Political scientist Daniel Barbu speaks of Ornea's works as having supplemented the lack of sociological research under communism, and thus one of the "outstanding authors" to have dedicated themselves to such overviews during that period (alongside Vladimir Tismăneanu, Pavel Câmpeanu, Henri H. Stahl and Vlad Georgescu). Another specialist in political science, Victor Rizescu, highlights the importance of Ornea's "interdisciplinary" approach among other such contributions, noting: "of the authors who wrote in this vein, it goes without saying that the hugely prolific stands out as the most important, due not only to his massive output, but also to the documentary soundness, coherence, clarity and literary value of his works. Trained as a sociologist but cohabitating, for the longest part of his career, with the community of literary historians, this author came closest of all exegetes of Romanian culture to offering a global investigation on the interrelationship to offering a global investigation of the interrelationship between literary, philosophical, sociological and economic ideas that confronted and influenced each other in the intellectual debates of the period 1860-1945."

Ornea's scholarly work reflected his familiarity with Romanian culture and the national vernacular, both of which earned the stated admiration of his peers. According to Ornea's own statement, Romanian language was "my motherland". The accomplished use and particularities of his literary language were highlighted by his colleague and disciple Alex. Ștefănescu, who noted his reliance on the dialectal speech of Moldavia region, as well as his preference for rekindling archaisms over adopting neologisms. Historian Adrian Cioroianu referred to Ornea as "a man of letters who transcends ethnicities", while writer Cristian Teodorescu noted that Ornea's "huge literary knowledge", reflecting a Jewish intellectual tradition, was complemented by a "peasant-like labor" rooted in his rural background.

The literary style characterizing Ornea's volumes is described by his Dilema Veche colleague Radu Cosașu as follows: "He sounds like a stern classic, incorruptible when it comes to the naïveté of hope, tenacious in the convictions he expresses on two-three voices, like Bach's Fugues, the only ones reliable, the only ones harmonious". Șușară compares the result of Ornea's research with novels by Honoré de Balzac, describing the Romanian author's "irrepressible thirst for inventory, for observation, for analysis and, obviously, the calling of a novelist who has not yet managed to set fire to his data sheets." In relation to Ornea's "mastery" in stylistic matters, critic Mircea Anghelescu made reference to the author's own image of his reader as "cultivated, of good faith and open to debate". Ștefănescu compared his former collaborator with Argentinian novelist Jorge Luis Borges, noting that both of them "were born and died in a library".

=== Ideological aspects ===
Zigu Ornea's early ideological commitments were retrospectively reviewed and placed in relation to his scientific contributions by his România Literară colleague, literary historian Nicolae Manolescu: "Z. Ornea was among those few to be passionate by the history of (literary, social, political) ideas, during a period when it was easier to approach literature from an aesthetic rather than ideological angle. [...] Shaped, how else?, under the impression of Marxism during the early fifties, Z. Ornea was never a dogmatic one." In Manolescu's assessment, Ornea's adaptation of Marxist critique was stood against the "rudimentary and often contradictory" official version, by tackling subjects uncomfortable for both the proletarian internationalism of the 1950s and the nationalist revival of the Ceaușescu era, by providing readers with glimpses into the works of writers condemned for being "reactionary", and by attempting to avoid "the Marxist clichés in fashion at the time." Daniel Barbu mirrors this assessment by reviewing Ornea as one of the "confessed and innovative Marxists".

As Ornea himself recalled later in life, his confrontation with the biography and work of Dobrogeanu-Gherea inaugurated his progressive break with Marxism. He credited his extensive research into the history of socialism with a "purification" of his convictions, leading him to conclude that Leninism and the October Revolution were indefensible. As a consequence, he grew interested in Reformism, Austromarxism and the non-Leninist Orthodox Marxism of Karl Kautsky, and, according to his colleague Ion Ianoși, had sympathy for the Right Opposition of Nikolai Bukharin (whom he reportedly viewed as a precursor of reformist Soviet leader Mikhail Gorbachev). In the end, Ornea came to the conclusion that the Eastern Bloc regimes could not be transformed by democratic reforms, and renounced all forms of Marxism. This change reflected gradually on his work. Rizescu and literary critic Daniel Cristea-Enache both noted that, progressively, Ornea replaced the Marxist system of reference with the classical liberalism of Eugen Lovinescu and Ștefan Zeletin. Answering on this issue, Ornea himself stated: "when reediting one of my works of synthesis on the various currents of thought [after 1989], I only had to perform very few modifications, a sure sign that my research method and the thought (vision) guiding me was not at all played out." Despite such ideological choices, Ianoși contends that Ornea was being secretly used by Romanian Communist Party leaders with literary or scientific ambitions, who would employ him as a ghostwriter, signing with their name works on which he had largely contributed his skills and his specialized knowledge.

While coming to question the official ideology, Ornea was already an opponent of the Romanian regime's methods. Around 1970, as nationalism, national communism and protochronism were being imposed on an increasing number of publications, Ornea joined the faction of professionals who attempted to promote a different line from within the cultural system. Reviewing this debate, literary critic Pia Brînzeu argued that Ornea, with Manolescu, Andrei Pleșu and Adrian Marino (who "appreciated Western values and favored the acceptance of some advanced social and cultural issues"), represented "the opposition" to communist or nationalist magazines such as Flacăra, Luceafărul and Săptămîna ("which insisted on maintaining Romania's isolation from Europe"). American researcher Katherine Verdery lists Ornea, Iorgulescu, Pleșu, Manolescu and Ștefănescu among those who "took a visible stand" against officially condoned protochronism (a group also including, in her opinion, Iorgulescu, Ovid Crohmălniceanu, Gheorghe Grigurcu, Norman Manea, Alexandru Paleologu and Eugen Simion). The disadvantage for Ornea's camp, Brînzeu writes, was in that its members generally "could not voice their opinions aloud". Verdery however singles out Ornea's "antiprotochronist" columns, which condemned the practice of prefacing reprints of consecrated scientific works with messages with retrospectively attached them to protochronist tenets (such as it was with a 1987 edition of Nicolae Iorga's Evoluția ideii de liberatate, "The Evolution of the Idea of Liberty", which the editor Ilie Bădescu had prefaced with a protochronist manifesto). Nevertheless, literary historian Florin Mihăilescu argues, protochronist ideologue Edgar Papu abusively cited Ornea's texts, alongside those of many other figures outside the national communist circles, in such manner as to appear that they too supported protochronist theories.

=== Early writings ===
One of Ornea's main preoccupations was the literary society Junimea and its impact on the local literary scene. His two main books on the matter (Junimismul and Junimea și junimismul) were closely interconnected, being seen by political scientist and literary critic Ioan Stanomir as two variants of the same study. Stanomir assess that the volumes helped in countering the popular view that the Junimist conservative critique of Romanian modernization through the imitation of Western models had failed its public when it came to offering an alternative: Ornea's review of 19th century sources, Stanomir claims, evidenced "the systemic dimension" of Maiorescu's Junimism. In publishing his Sămănătorismul, Zigu Ornea detailed the evolution of a successful post-Junimist current, whose traditionalist and ruralist doctrine shaped Romanian ethnic nationalism during later decades. As the author himself stated in 2001, the volume also stood as a comment on later developments: "my book is profoundly critical toward Sămănătorism, as well as toward all currents of thought that traditionalist-nativist in structure." According to Manolescu, such attitudes were adding to the communist regime's suspicion of the author, since, at the time when the book was published, voicing criticism of the traditionalist circles was the equivalent of not being "a good Romanian". Writing in 1989, Spanish historian Francisco Veiga described Sămănătorismul as "the best reference work on this subject".

In 2001, while assessing the conclusions drawn by Sămănătorismul and being inquired by Daniel Cristea-Enache about the book's implications, Ornea discussed the paradox of his stated admiration for Iorga, the Sămănătorist theorist and historian. Acknowledging that Iorga's political thought signified "xenophobic nationalism" and evidenced that its proponent was a "constant antisemite", Ornea assessed that, nevertheless, the same intellectual figure stood out for rejecting more violent forms of antisemitism, and was an outspoken adversary of the radically fascist Iron Guard. In parallel, he noted, Iorga's scientific and literary contribution were irreproachable, making informal references to the historian as "apostle of the nation" entirely justified. Ornea discussed such aspects in contrast to the legacy of interwar Trăirist philosopher and Iron Guard sympathizer Nae Ionescu, who introduced a theoretical separation between, on one hand, Romanians of the Orthodox faith, and, on the other, Romanians of other creeds and the ethnic minorities. Such distinctions, Ornea noted, "defy the spirit of democratic tolerance", and were used by Ionescu himself as an ideological weapon not just against Jews such as Mihail Sebastian, but also against the Romanian Greek-Catholic man of letters Samuil Micu-Klein and the liberal current's founding figure Ion Brătianu.

=== Tradiționalism și modernitate and biographical studies ===
According to Katherine Verdery, Tradiționalism și modernitate în deceniul al treilea makes Ornea "the most energetic Romanian student" to have investigated the cultural debates of the early interwar. Historian Nicolae Păun sees the work itself as also relevant for the cultural debates of Ornea's day, or "an analysis of the interwar period's message and its perception within a Romanian society fed by the passionate conflict between modernity and tradition." In his view, the work only partly compensates for a lack of sheer historiographic research dedicated to the events themselves because these were still being viewed as recent or directly meaningful for the relative present (and therefore subject to much debate). Păun's colleague Florin Țurcanu describes Ornea's work as "a very useful account of the 1920s press". He cites Tradiționalism și modernitate for tracing the links between, on one hand, the Romanian traditionalist environment in the wake of World War I and, on the other, France's integralist faction (the Action Française), for discussing the role of Romanian traditionalists as cultural critics in their conflict with the interwar establishment, as well as for researching the links between the neo-traditionalists at Gândirea magazine and the original editorial line of Cuvântul daily. The work opened further research into the connections between traditionalism and the emerging far right, primarily the Iron Guard.

In his 1979 introduction to Eugen Lovinescu, Ornea notably focused on his predecessor's thoughts about the necessity of modernization, Westernization and direct borrowings from Western Europe, discussing their role in the interwar polemic between modernists and traditionalists, but also evidencing their agreement with the thesis of his left-wing adversaries (Dobrogeanu-Gherea or Garabet Ibrăileanu). Ornea's study of Dobrogeanu-Gherea is described as "his best book" by Tiberiu Avramescu. It, like the similar study on Maiorescu's life, primarily focused on the debate opposing Junimists and socialists, expanding on its political characteristics: to the Marxist program of Dobrogeanu-Gherea and the Romanian Social Democratic Workers' Party, Maiorescu opposed both his skepticism of collectivism and a belief that all social change needed to follow slow steps in Romania. Ornea's own conclusion stated that Dobrogeanu-Gherea had always been preoccupied with "demonstrating [...] the legitimacy of socialism in our country".

The work was followed by a similar monograph on Constantin Stere, seen by Augustin Buzura as "a revelation". Its final section, largely dealing with the uncomfortable subject of Stere's Germanophilia, could only see print after the end of communism, and, according to Rizescu, influenced an entire generation's view of Poporanist foreign policy. This contribution was however criticized by Lucian Boia. Boia described the monograph as "fundamental", but found that Ornea was lenient and partisan on the issue of Stere's links with the Central Powers in the World War I occupation of Romania.

=== Anii treizeci. Extrema dreaptă românească ===
On the basis of material cited from the interwar press and various archives, Anii treizeci. Extrema dreaptă românească was a chronological expansion of Tradiționalism și modernitate în deceniul al treilea. In Nicolae Manolescu's assessment, the newer work was important for the overall perspective it sheds on the cultural debates of the 1930s and beyond: "Zigu Ornea's merit is in having balanced out the perspective on the second most important period of our modern period [...]. Informed, displaying the common sense of the professional man, objective and modest, Zigu Ornea ought to be consulted by all those who seek out the major ideological hypotheses on the interwar issue. And, of course, not just by them."

The study was poorly received by a portion of the Romanian cultural environment, who objected to the revelations about the direct connections between various interwar intellectuals and fascist groups such as the Iron Guard. Rejecting accusations that he was diverting focus from the negative impact of communism, Ornea stated that he had simply carried on with research that would have been censored under Ceaușescu: "I continued my exegesis on the currents of thought of the interwar. In 1980 I published a book on the twenties, named Tradiționalism și modernitate în deceniul al treilea. I could not, at the time, advance in this field because I could not write with probity about totalitarianism under totalitarian currents of thought. [...] In autumn 1990 I returned to the interwar period [...]. There was not a single malevolent intent in doing so. I purely and simply carried on with an exegesis I had begun earlier". His preface for one edition of the book further explained this rationale: "[The book] could not be published because it was impossible to properly comment on the ideas of totalitarianism and the single party [and] of parliamentary democracy [...]. And it should not have been published then because it unveiled the political credo of those who, back in the thirties, were the prominent personalities among the new generation (Mircea Eliade, Emil Cioran, Constantin Noica and others). It was untimely because it would have provided arguments for not publishing their work (which, in any case, was always subject to the uncertain status of accidental tolerance). And I figured, like so many other intellectuals, that the work of these personalities should have, by all means, been published. I therefore postponed the writing of this book for settled times placed under a more fastidious sign".

Literary reviewer Cosmin Ciotloș nevertheless noted: "Z. Ornea's book on the thirties is no less a book about the nineties, when it was finally written and published." To support this assessment, Ciotloș identifies an allusion to the radically nationalist magazine România Mare, founded by politician Corneliu Vadim Tudor in the 1990s, as well as direct parallels drawn by the author between the Iron Guard's guidelines and the various tenets of Romanian communism. The chronicler also noted that this approach did not lack "analytical balance", arguing: "Anii treizeci. Extrema dreaptă românească is equally far from supporting a plea and insinuating an indictment. Therefore, this study benefits not just from a proper scientific location, but also from a correct political positioning." Ornea himself also noted that the purpose of his investigation was not to deny merit to those Romanian intellectuals who had value beyond their political commitment, but expressed the opinion that Eliade's far right commitment of the 1930s had more serious consequences than the post-1945 acceptance of communist guidelines by George Călinescu, Mihai Ralea or Tudor Vianu (who, he claimed, compromised their values so as to preserve some academic standard during "harsh times").

In contrast to the controversy surrounding its exposure of fascist biographies, the work also drew criticism for being too lenient on the political and cultural establishment of the 1930s. Historian Maria Bucur, who investigated the widespread advocacy of eugenics during the Romanian interwar, is skeptical about Ornea's claim that intellectual supporters of liberal democracy were clearly separated from and always outnumbered those who preached authoritarianism, arguing that her own study proves otherwise: "The position of the Romanian eugenicists challenges this confidence in the support for democracy in interwar Romania. While a few of these individuals did identify directly with the extreme right, many more eugenicists considered themselves moderate [...]. The spectrum of illiberalism was broader and less clearly identified with a marginal radical rightist position than Ornea suggests in his study." Rizescu also finds flaw in the book's perceived search for centrist references, which, he claims, led Ornea to neglect the contribution of Marxists and peasantists active in the 1930s, and as such to avoid inaugurating an "extensive interpretative revisions" of interwar leftist ideas for a post-communist world. He notes: "Indeed, while Tradiționalism și modernitate is broad and ambitious in scope, paying equal attention to social-economic as well as to literary-philosophical debates, and trying to present a complete picture of the intellectual concerns and intellectual trends of the age, Anii treizeci is quite narrowly focused on the rise of the extreme right and the reactions this phenomenon raised raised among the thinkers of a different orientation. [...] The general impression one gets, after this comparison, is that Ornea [...] avoided to make the effort to re-comprehend, in post-communist terms, the problems connected with the sociological and economic component of pre-communist doctrines and ideological currents, as well as to discover a new, post-totalitarian 'language', fit for preserving the vagaries of the Romanian left."

In contrast, Nicolae Manolescu finds that, in interpreting the rise of fascism, disproved the class struggle perspective inculcated by communist historiography, Ornea's book accurately depicted two intertwined characteristics: the pro-democratic spirit of mainstream Romanian intellectuals; the eccentricity and marginality of both fascists and communists relative to most social environments. Ciotloș, who reserves praise for the "characterologic tints" displayed by Anii treizeci... (such as in Ornea's decision to discuss the political mythology surrounding Iron Guard leader Corneliu Zelea Codreanu in a chapter of its own), finds that the "most debatable" and "speculative" thesis of the book is Ornea's treatment of the 1930s far right purely as an ideological appendix of the 1920s (believing this hierarchy to more accurately reflect Ornea's views on the continuity between the 1980s and '90s). The critique is shared by Manolescu, who argues that Ornea had failed to acknowledge that the supremacy of modernism in the 1920s had been replaced with a new wave of traditionalism in the final part of the interwar, and that racial antisemitism had only become a phenomenon after 1930.

=== Final volumes ===
Ornea's other late volumes include various collections of essays and literary chronicles, which focus on a diversity of subjects in philology as well the history of ideas. The final such book, Medalioane de istorie literară, includes chronicles of new historiographic works, as well as overviews of established contributions to literature and political theory or inquiries into themes of historical debate. The former category includes his review of books by Maria Todorova (Imagining the Balkans) and Sorin Alexandrescu. Among the other chapters of the work are debates about the legacy of various 20th century intellectuals—Cioran and Noica, as well as Iorga, Lucrețiu Pătrășcanu, Anton Golopenția, Henri H. Stahl and Constantin Rădulescu-Motru—, commentary on the work of other celebrated authors from various periods—Tudor Arghezi, Ion Luca Caragiale, Eugène Ionesco, Panait Istrati, Ioan Slavici, Vasile Alecsandri, Nicolae Filimon—, case studies of Romanian culture in Romania or in outside regions (Bessarabia), and the cultural ambitions of authoritarian King of Romania Carol II. One other of the book's essays, which has its starting point the censoring of Liviu Rebreanu's diary by members of his own family, discusses issues pertaining to the privacy of public figures in general. Medalioane also included the occasional article on current issues, such as one outlining concerns raised by the closure of Editura Meridiane.

The final such collection of disparate pieces (Zigu Ornea. Permanența cărturarului) grouped other essays. Several of these traced the history of antisemitic legislation in Romania starting with the 1866 Constitution, which had effectively delayed Jewish Emancipation by treating most Jews as aliens (a measure Ornea defined as an ab ovo form of discrimination, his syntagma being later borrowed by researcher Michael Shafir). Other such late contributions focused on reviewing new editions of literary works, based on Ornea's belief that the survival of literary chronicles in post-1989 Romania needed active encouragement.

== Legacy ==
=== Influence ===
While Ornea himself is described by his various peers as a modest man who would not seek or discuss honors, one of the controversies surrounding his work involves its lack of acceptance by some areas of the cultural establishment. Several of his colleagues, including essayists Mircea Iorgulescu and Andrei Pleșu and cultural historian Andrei Oișteanu, publicly expressed indignation that he has never been considered for membership in the Romanian Academy. According to Pleșu, the institution was thus reconfirming the earlier rejection of Jewish scholars such as Moses Gaster, Lazăr Șăineanu or Heimann Hariton Tiktin, and instead kept itself open to "demagogues of tradition". Iorgulescu also commented: "When [Ornea] turned 50 I wrote that he alone values as much as an Academy institute. [...] But the Ceaușist Academy had other preoccupations [than to include Ornea]. As did the 'liberated' one following '89. Having died without previous notice, and even rudely so, Z. Ornea left it without a chance to have him in its ranks. A shame that cannot be cleansed out by the poor Romanian Academy for all eternity..."

Writing in 2004, Ion Simuț argued that Ornea's death had contributed to depleting Romania's literary scene of its specialists, a negative phenomenon which, he argued, was leading literary historiography into the "most serious impasse in its evolution". A similar assessment was provided by literary chronicler Gabriel Dimisianu, who noted Ornea's role in influencing others to take up literary research, "an activity that is more and more exposed to hardships." Literary historian Ileana Ghemeș notes that the "generic assessment and labels" Ornea's Sămănătorismul generated in relation to the "clichés" of traditionalist literature were still shaping the analytical work of other Romanian researchers in later decades. Among Ornea's other scholarly works, Anii treizecii... inaugurated further investigations in the field, carried out by younger researchers: Sorin Alexandrescu, Marta Petreu and Florin Țurcanu among them. According to Cristea-Enache, such "rigurously scientific research" was equivalent to Ana Selejan's parallel investigation into the communization of Romania's literary scene during the late 1940s and early 1950s. In addition to Ornea's direct influences on his colleagues' approach, Manolescu credits his older friend's persistence and active encouragement with having led him to pursue work on his own synthesis of Romanian literary history, Istoria critică a literaturii române ("The Critical History of Romanian Literature").

=== Posthumous controversy ===
A controversy surrounding Ornea's legacy was sparked in 2007, when Ziua journal published two articles signed by journalist Ion Spânu, who depicted the historian as an informant for the communist secret police, the Securitate. The first one of these pieces, directed mainly against philosopher Gabriel Liiceanu (who later sued the newspaper and Spânu on grounds of libel), made an additional claim that Ornea and philosopher Mihai Șora had together denounced Constantin Noica to the Securitate for writing dissenting essays on Hegelianism. The articles claimed that documents published earlier by Observator Cultural magazine had "clearly asserted" this. In a later article, Spânu returned with similar claims about the Noica trial, further alleging that Ornea "hated" Noica, and that this sentiment was the basis for the negative comments in Anii treizeci....

The accusation was hotly contested by historian George Ardeleanu, who had contributed the original Observatorul Cultural dossier on Noica, and who stated that Spânu's claim was based on "an erroneous, if not indeed heinous, reading of the documents". Ardeleanu wrote that the documents actually showed how the Securitate had already been informed about Noica's intention, through secret channels; he added that both Ornea and Șora had actually made public efforts to obtain imprimatur for Noica's book, and that the subsequent show trial was exclusively based on the authorities' own speculations.

Ardeleanu's assessment was endorsed by the magazine's editor Carmen Mușat, in a special editorial piece. Arguing that the Ziua series was proof of defamation, she asserted that all published evidence disproved Spânu's theory, while commenting: "For any man with common sense and a complete mind, the facts are evident. For impostors however, evidence does not matter. In defaming, they create a parallel reality which they seek to accredit by means of rudimentary aggressiveness." A collective editorial piece in România Literară voiced appreciation for Mușat's interpretation, calling the Ziua piece "mystification" and arguing: "The two prestigious men of letters [Ornea and Șora], of whom one can no longer defend himself, were accused of having been 'informants of the Securitate in the Noica affair', with the invocation of documents which, when properly interpreted, show that they themselves have been 'collateral victims' of the monstrous repressive institution."
