= Humanitas (publishing house) =

Romanian publishing house

- Logo
- Status: Active
- Predecessor: Editura Politică
- Founded: February 1, 1990; 35 years ago
- Founder: Gabriel Liiceanu
- Country of origin: Romania
- Headquarters location: Piața Presei Libere 1 (House of the Free Press), Bucharest
- Publication types: Books
- Imprints: Humanitas Classic; Humanitas Fiction; Humanitas Junior; Humanitas Multimedia
- Official website: www.humanitas.ro

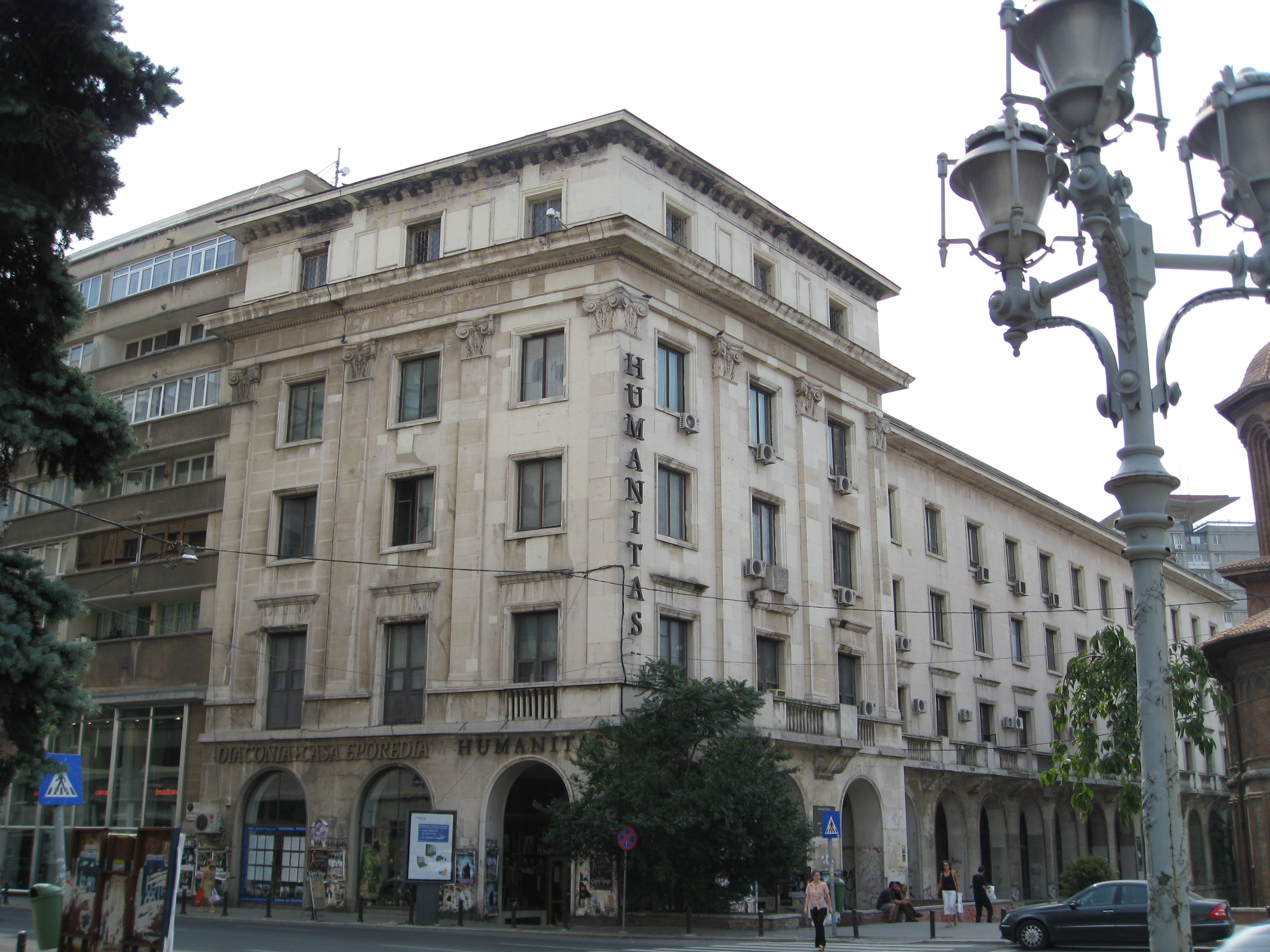
Main offices

Humanitas (Romanian: Editura Humanitas) is an independent Romanian publishing house, located at Piața Presei Libere 1 (House of the Free Press), Bucharest. It was founded on February 1, 1990 (after the Romanian Revolution) by the philosopher Gabriel Liiceanu, based on a state-owned publishing house, Editura Politică. Its slogan is Humanitas, bunul gust al libertății ("Humanitas, the good taste of freedom").

During its first years, Humanitas mainly published authors from the Romanian diaspora, whose works had been subject to censorship or banning in Communist Romania; they include Emil Cioran, Mircea Eliade, and Eugène Ionesco.

Currently, Humanitas publishes literature, books on philosophy, religion, social and political sciences, history, memoirs, popular science, children's literature, and self-help books.

== Main Romanian authors published by Humanitas ==
- Lucian Blaga
- Ana Blandiana
- Lucian Boia
- Matei Călinescu
- Mircea Cărtărescu
- Emil Cioran
- Lena Constante
- Petru Creția
- Neagu Djuvara
- Mircea Eliade
- Paul Goma
- Virgil Ierunca
- Eugène Ionesco
- Gabriel Liiceanu
- Monica Lovinescu
- Constantin Noica
- Ion Mihai Pacepa
- Horia-Roman Patapievici
- Andrei Pleșu
- Queen Anne of Romania
- Dumitru Stăniloae
