= Dealu (disambiguation) =

Dealu ("the hill") may refer to several places in Romania:

- Dealu, a commune in Harghita County
- Dealu, a village in Hârtiești Commune, Argeș County
- Dealu, a village in Crevedia Mare Commune, Giurgiu County
- Dealu, a village in Zvoriștea Commune, Suceava County
- Dealu Monastery, near Târgoviște

additionally, several places in Romania end in "-Deal":

- Bolintin-Deal, a commune in Giurgiu County
- Bălteni-Deal, a village in Bălteni Commune, Vaslui County
- Bursuc-Deal, a village in Lespezi Commune, Iaşi County
- Cândeşti-Deal, a village in Cândești Commune, Dâmbovița County
- Cătămărești-Deal and Cervicești-Deal, villages in Mihai Eminescu Commune, Botoșani County
- Ciurari-Deal, a village in Gratia Commune, Teleorman County
- Copalnic-Deal, a village in Copalnic-Mănăștur Commune, Maramureș County
- Costeşti-Deal, a village in Orăștioara de Sus Commune, Hunedoara County
- Curseşti-Deal, a village in Pungeşti Commune, Vaslui County
- Dragomireşti-Deal, a village in Dragomirești-Vale Commune, Ilfov County
- Dumbrava-Deal, a village in Săvinești Commune, Neamţ County
- Frasin-Deal, a village in Cobia Commune, Dâmbovița County
- Glâmbocata-Deal, a village in Leordeni Commune, Argeș County
- Orășeni-Deal, a village in Curtești Commune, Botoșani County
- Pătroaia-Deal. a village in Crângurile Commune, Dâmbovița County
- Poieneşti-Deal, a village in Poienești Commune, Vaslui County
- Potlogeni-Deal, a village in Petrești Commune, Dâmbovița County
- Rădoieşti-Deal, a village in Rădoiești Commune, Teleorman County
- Rânghilești-Deal, a village in Santa Mare Commune, Botoșani County
- Săliştea-Deal, a village in Săliștea Commune, Alba County
- Segarcea-Deal, a village in Segarcea-Vale Commune, Teleorman County
- Umbrăreşti-Deal, a village in Umbrărești Commune, Galați County
- Vlădeni-Deal, a village in Frumușica Commune, Botoșani County

== See also ==
- Deleni (disambiguation)
- Delureni (disambiguation)
- Deleanu (surname)
