= Deleanu =

Deleanu is a Romanian surname. Notable people with the surname include:

- Artiom Deleanu (born 1999), Moldovan Greco-Roman wrestler
- Augustin Deleanu (1944–2014), Romanian footballer
- Cristina Deleanu (1940–2025), Romanian actress
- Ion Budai-Deleanu (1760–1820), Romanian philologist, historian and writer
- Irina Deleanu (born 1975), Romanian rhythmic gymnast
- Liviu Deleanu (1911–1967), Moldovan and Romanian writer

== See also ==
- Dealu (disambiguation)
- Deleni (disambiguation)
- Delureni (disambiguation)
