= Pârtești =

Pârteşti may refer to several places in Romania:

- Pârteștii de Jos, a commune in Suceava County
- Pârteştii de Sus, a village in Cacica Commune, Suceava County
