= Andrei Pleșu =

Romanian philosopher (born 1948)

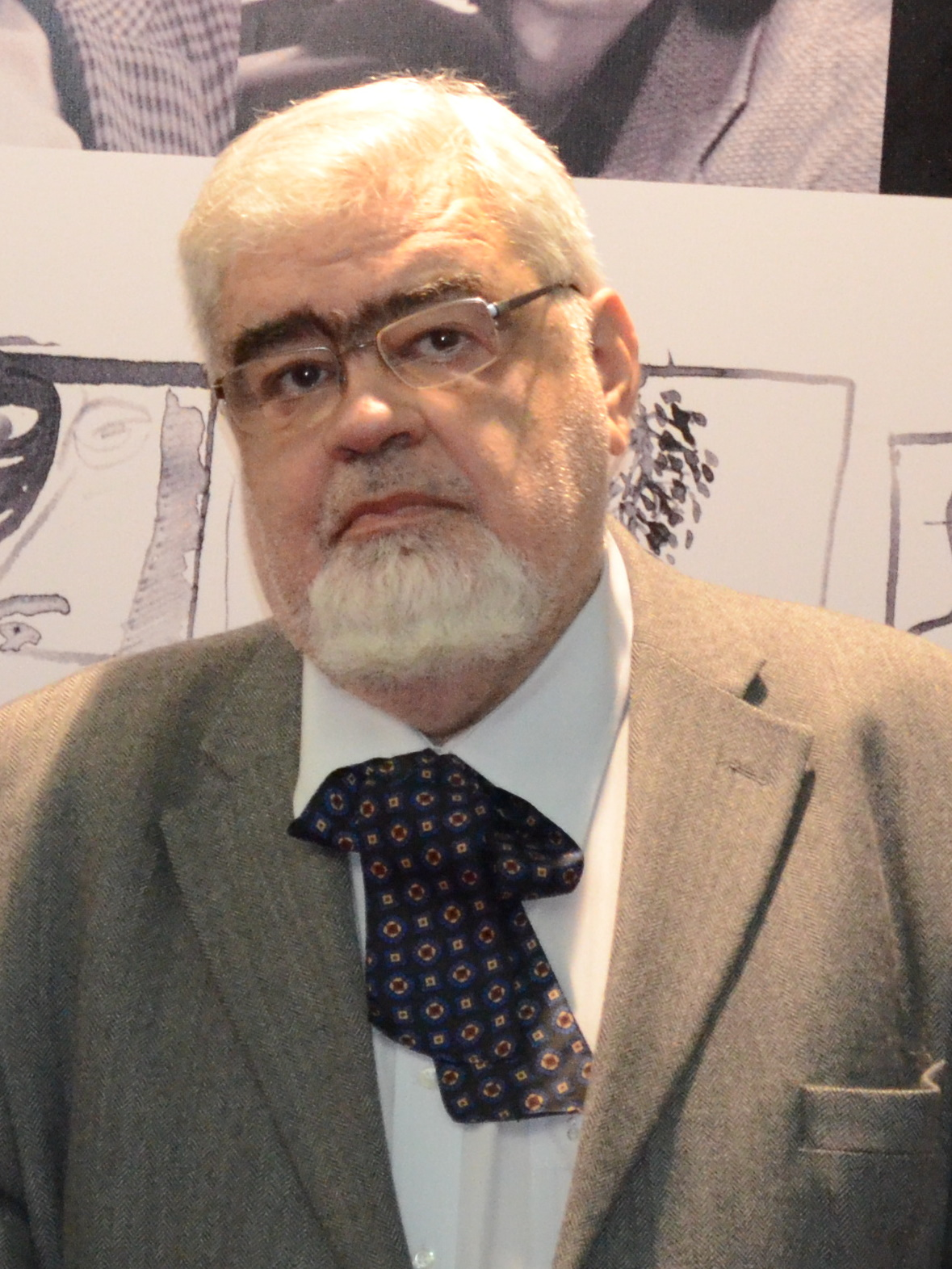
- Pleșu in 2011

Minister of Culture
- In office 26 December 1989 – 16 October 1991
- Prime Minister: Petre Roman; Theodor Stolojan (acting)
- Succeeded by: Ludovic Spiess

Minister of Foreign Affairs
- In office 29 December 1997 – 22 December 1999
- Prime Minister: Victor Ciorbea; Gavril Dejeu (acting); Radu Vasile; Alexandru Athanasiu (acting)
- Preceded by: Adrian Severin
- Succeeded by: Petre Roman

Personal details
- Born: Andrei Gabriel Pleșu; 23 August 1948 (age 78) Bucharest, Romania
- Party: Romanian Communist Party (1968–1982); National Salvation Front
- Spouse: Catrinel-Maria Petrulian

Andrei Gabriel Pleșu (Romanian pronunciation: [anˈdrej ɡabriˈel ˈpleʃu]; born 23 August 1948) is a Romanian philosopher, essayist, journalist, literary and art critic. He has been intermittently involved in politics, having been appointed Minister of Culture (1989–1991), Minister of Foreign Affairs (1997–1999) and presidential counsellor for external affairs (2004–2005).

== Biography ==
Born in Bucharest, the son of Radu Pleșu, a surgeon and Zoe Pleșu (born Rădulescu), he spent much of his early youth in the countryside. He started school in Sinaia, but attended the village school in Pârscov, in the Nehoiu Valley from 1955 to 1957, and often returned to the mountains during school holidays. Pleșu attended the Spiru Haret Lyceum in Bucharest majoring in humanities, where he graduated at the top of his class.

Pleșu studied art history at the Bucharest National University of Arts and graduated with his bachelor's degree in 1971. That year he accepted a position as a researcher at the Institute of Art History of the Romanian Academy. In 1972 he married Catrinel Maria Petrulian. Whilst a student he had become a member of the Communist Party, from which he was expelled in May 1982 due to his involvement in the so-called "Transcendental Meditation Affair". For 1975–1977 he received the first of his Alexander von Humboldt Foundation graduate scholarships, to study in Bonn and Heidelberg. From 1978 through 1982, along with Gabriel Liiceanu, he attended Constantin Noica's informal and semi-clandestine lectures in Păltiniș. In 1980 he became a faculty lecturer in the Art department at the University of Bucharest. However, in 1982 he was barred from further university teaching for "political reasons", and took a job as a consultant for the Artists Union. He received his second Alexander von Humboldt Foundation scholarship for 1983–1984, and upon his return again worked at the Institute of Art History.

In April 1989, Pleșu lost his job at the Institute of Art History due to his open support of Mircea Dinescu, objected to by the communist regime. This resulted in his "exile" to Tescani, a village in Berești-Tazlău commune, Bacău County, and he was forbidden from publishing. After the Romanian Revolution of 1989, he was one of the founders of the "New Europe College", an institute of advanced studies, and of the cultural magazine Dilema (now Dilema Veche). He worked as a professor at the Bucharest National University of Arts and is now a professor at the University of Bucharest, where he teaches art history and philosophy of religion. He continues to be successful as a writer, and his books have all been well received by critics and readers.

He also became involved in politics, serving as Romania's Minister of Culture from 1989 to 1991, and foreign minister from 1997 to 1999. Between 2000 and 2004, Pleșu was a member of the National College for the Study of the Securitate Archives; he resigned the latter office in protest against political pressures on the committee. After the 2004 elections brought Traian Băsescu to the office of President of Romania, he became presidential counsellor for external affairs, a position he held until June 2005, when he resigned invoking health issues.

Two volumes were published in 2009, honoring Pleșu, both edited by Mihail Neamțu and Bogdan Tătaru-Cazaban. The first was O filozofie a intervalului: In Honorem Andrei Pleșu (A Philosophy of the Interval: In Honor of Andrei Pleșu) entirely in Romanian, and the second was an international Festschrift in honor of Pleșu's sixtieth birthday, with essays exploring the themes of his life in the current context.

== Philosophy ==
Pleșu's early works revolved around art history and theory, but, in time, his essays, published in cultural magazines and elsewhere, became oriented towards cultural anthropology and philosophy.

== Works ==
=== Printed volumes ===
- Călătorie în lumea formelor ("Journey to the world of forms"), Meridiane, 1974
- Pitoresc și melancolie ("The Picturesque and melancholy"), Univers, 1980
- Francesco Guardi, Meridiane, 1981
- Ochiul și lucrurile ("The eye and things"), Meridiane, 1986
- Minima moralia ("The moral minimum"), Cartea Românească, 1988
- Dialoguri de seară ("Evening dialogues"), Harisma, 1991
- Jurnalul de la Tescani ("The Tescani journal"), Humanitas, 1993
- Limba păsărilor ("The language of birds"), Humanitas, 1994
- Chipuri și măști ale tranziției ("Faces and masks of the transition"), Humanitas, 1996
- Transformări, inerții, dezordini. 22 de luni după 22 decembrie 1989 ("Transformations, inertias, disorders". 22 months after December 22, 1989"), co-authors Petre Roman and Elena Ștefoi), Polirom, 2002
- Despre îngeri ("On angels"), Humanitas, 2003
- Obscenitatea publică ("Public obscenity"), Humanitas, 2004
- Comedii la porțile Orientului ("Comedies at gates of the Orient"), Humanitas, 2005
- Despre bucurie în Est și în Vest și alte eseuri ("About Joy in East and West and other essays"), Humanitas, 2006
- Despre frumusețea uitată a vieții ("About the Forgotten Beauty of Life"), Humanitas, 2011
- Parabolele lui Iisus. Adevărul ca poveste ("Jesus' parables. The truth as story"), Humanitas, 2012

=== Audio books ===
- Despre îngeri ("On angels") Humanitas, 2003, 2005
- Comédii la porțile Orientului ("Comedies at gates of the Orient"), Humanitas, 2005
- Un alt fel de Caragiale ("A different Caragiale"), Humanitas, 2006
- Despre bucurie în Est și în Vest și alte eseuri ("About Joy in East and West and Other Essays"), Humanitas, 2006

== Awards ==
- Grand Officer of the Order of the Diplomatic Merit
- Grand Cross of the National Order of Faithful Service
