= Deleni (Mureș) =

Deleni Deleni-patak
- Location within Romania

Location
- Country: Romania
- Counties: Mureș County
- Villages: Deleni, Ideciu de Jos

Physical characteristics
- Mouth: Mureș
  - location: Ideciu de Jos
  - coordinates: 46.8069°N 24.7434°E
- Length: 13 km (8.1 mi)
- Basin size: 30 km^{2} (12 sq mi)

Basin features
- Progression: Mureș→ Tisza→ Danube→ Black Sea

The Deleni (Hungarian: Deleni-patak) is a left tributary of the river Mureș in Transylvania, Romania. It discharges into the Mureș in Ideciu de Jos. Its length is 13 km (8.1 mi) and its basin size is 30 km^{2} (12 sq mi).
