= Delureni =

Delureni may refer to several villages in Romania:

- Delureni, a village in Urmeniș Commune, Bistriţa-Năsăud County
- Delureni, a village in Ponoarele Commune, Mehedinţi County
- Delureni, a village in Ionești, Vâlcea
- Delureni, a village in Stoilești Commune, Vâlcea County
- Delureni, a village in Valea Mare, Vâlcea
- Delureni, the name of Beznea village, Bratca Commune, Bihor County, between 1964 and 1996

== See also ==
- Dealu (disambiguation)
- Deleni (disambiguation)
- Deleanu (surname)
