= Cristina Deleanu =

Romanian actress (1940–2025)

Cristina Deleanu (22 December 1940 – 15 May 2025) was a Romanian actress.

== Life and career ==
Deleanu was born in Ploiești on 22 December 1940, to Dimitrie Deleanu (1900–1944) and Angela Deleanu, (1900–1989). Her father was killed in the Bombing of Bucharest in World War II.

In 1962, after graduation, she was assigned to the Vasile Alecsandri National Theater, where she performed between 1962 and 1967. In 1967, she transferred to the Barbu Delavrancea Regional Theatre, where she performed between 1967 and 1981. In 1981, she transferred to the Ion Luca Caragiale National Theatre in Bucharest, where she remained until retirement in 2001.

In 2003, she performed in New Year's Eve in "Terzo Mondo" at the Bucharest National Theatre.

Deleanu died in Bucharest on 15 May 2025, at the age of 84.
