= Virgil Ierunca =

Romanian writer

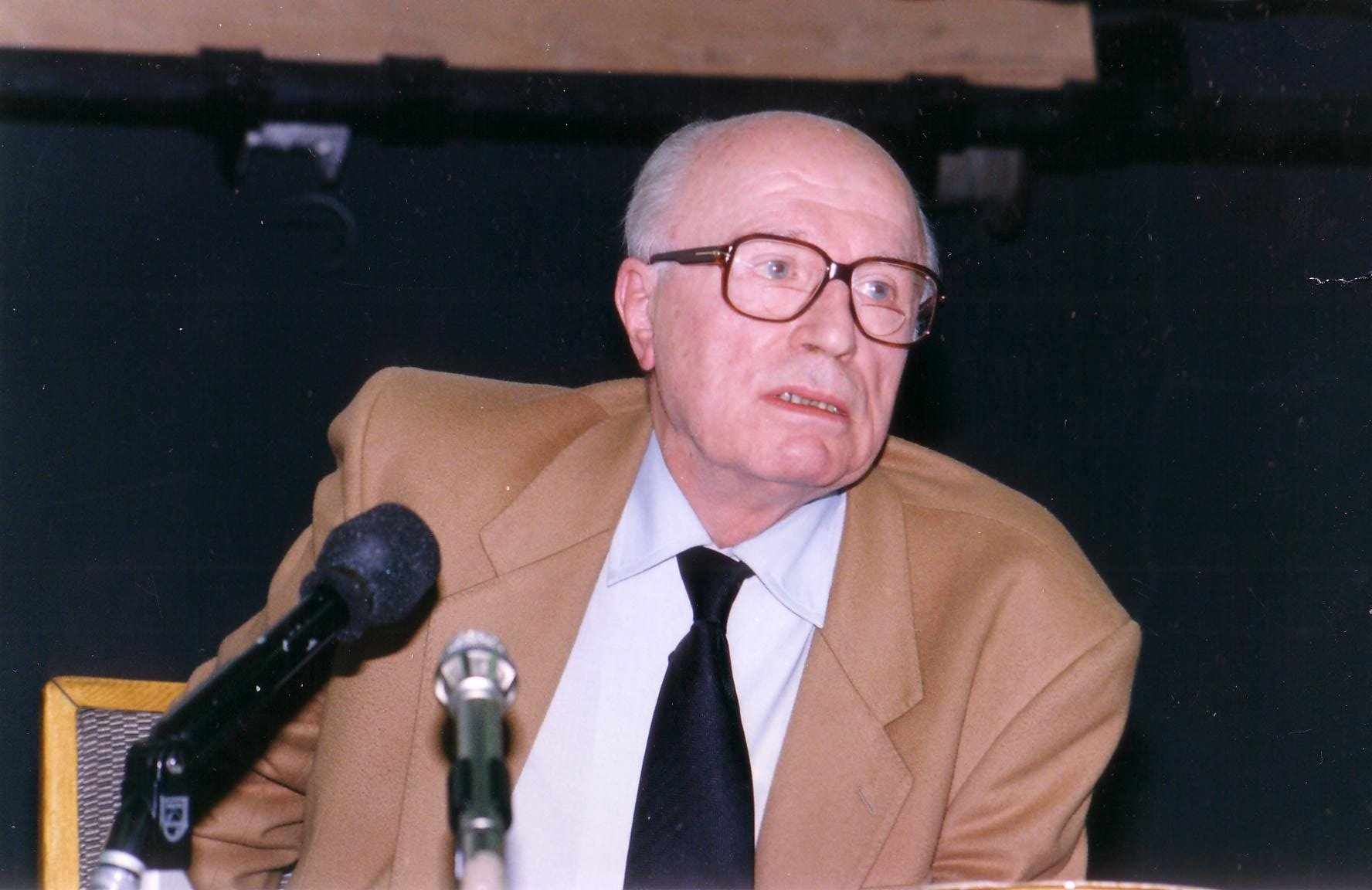
Virgil Ierunca in 1994

Virgil Ierunca (Romanian pronunciation: [virˈd͡ʒil jeˈruŋka]; born Virgil Untaru [unˈtaru]; August 16, 1920, Lădești, Vâlcea County – September 28, 2006, Paris) was a Romanian literary critic, journalist, and poet. He was married to Monica Lovinescu.

Both Ierunca and Lovinescu worked for several decades for Radio Free Europe.

In 2006 both were members of the Romanian Presidential Commission for the Study of the Communist Dictatorship in Romania; the Commission's chairman, Vladimir Tismăneanu, called them "the most honest and dignified couple in the history of Romanian culture".

In December 2023, a monumental ensemble featuring statues of Ierunca and Lovinescu united by a stainless steel mantle, next to a tree of evil (a parable of the Securitate agents that had infiltrated Radio Free Europe) was inaugurated in the Cotroceni neighborhood of Bucharest.

== Published books ==
- Fenomenul Pitești (Ed. Humanitas, Bucharest, 1990)
- Românește (Ed. Humanitas, Bucharest, 1991)
- Subiect şi predicat (Ed. Humanitas, Bucharest, 1993)
- Dimpotrivă (Ed. Humanitas, Bucharest, 1994)
- Semnul mirării (Ed. Humanitas, Bucharest, 1995)
- Trecut-au anii (Ed. Humanitas, Bucharest, 2000)
- Poeme de exil (Ed. Humanitas, Bucharest, 2001)
