= Frumușica, Botoșani =

Frumușica
- Commune
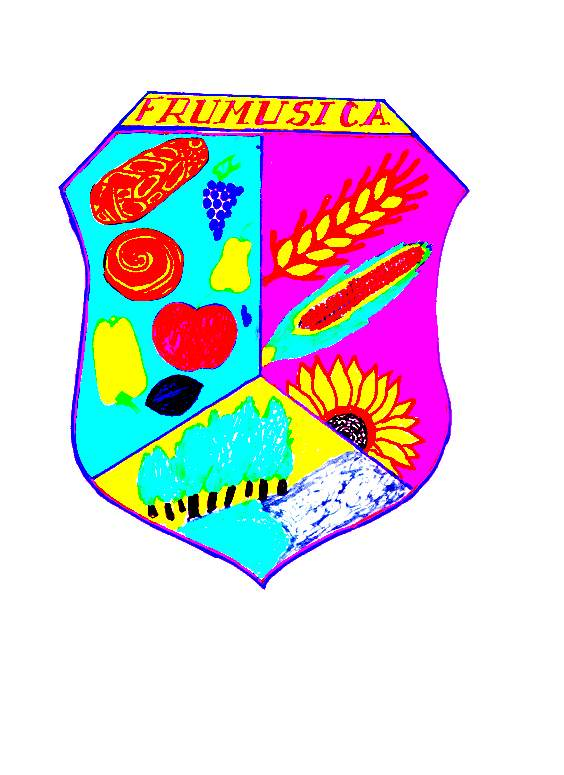
- Coat of arms

- Location in Botoșani County

- Location in Romania
- Coordinates: 47°32′N 26°54′E
- Country: Romania
- County: Botoșani
- Subdivisions: Frumușica, Boscoteni, Rădeni, Storești, Șendreni, Vlădeni-Deal

Government
  - Mayor (2024–2028): Nelu Cuibar (PSD)
- Area: 84.93 km^{2} (32.79 sq mi)
- Elevation: 135 m (443 ft)
- Population (2021-12-01): 5,098
  - Density: 60.03/km^{2} (155.5/sq mi)
- Time zone: UTC+02:00 (EET)
  - Summer (DST): UTC+03:00 (EEST)
- Postal code: 717160
- Area code: +40 x31
- Vehicle reg.: BT

Frumușica is a commune in Botoșani County, Western Moldavia, Romania. It is composed of six villages: Boscoteni, Frumușica, Rădeni, Storești, Șendreni and Vlădeni-Deal.

On July 5, 2010, the Danube in Galați recorded a flow rate of 676 cm (76 cm above the rate of flooding) and a flow of 16,055 m/s. At Șendreni, the Siret had a rate of 728 cm (78 cm over the danger level). The local emergency services reinforced the dykes in the afternoon and narrowly averted any additional flooding. It was flooded during the July 2010 flood as was its namesake in Galați County.

== Natives ==
- Zigu Ornea

== See also ==
- Global storm activity of 2010
- 2010 Romanian floods
