= Păltiniș =

Păltiniș Hohe Rinne (German) Szebenjuharos (Hungarian)
- Mountain resort
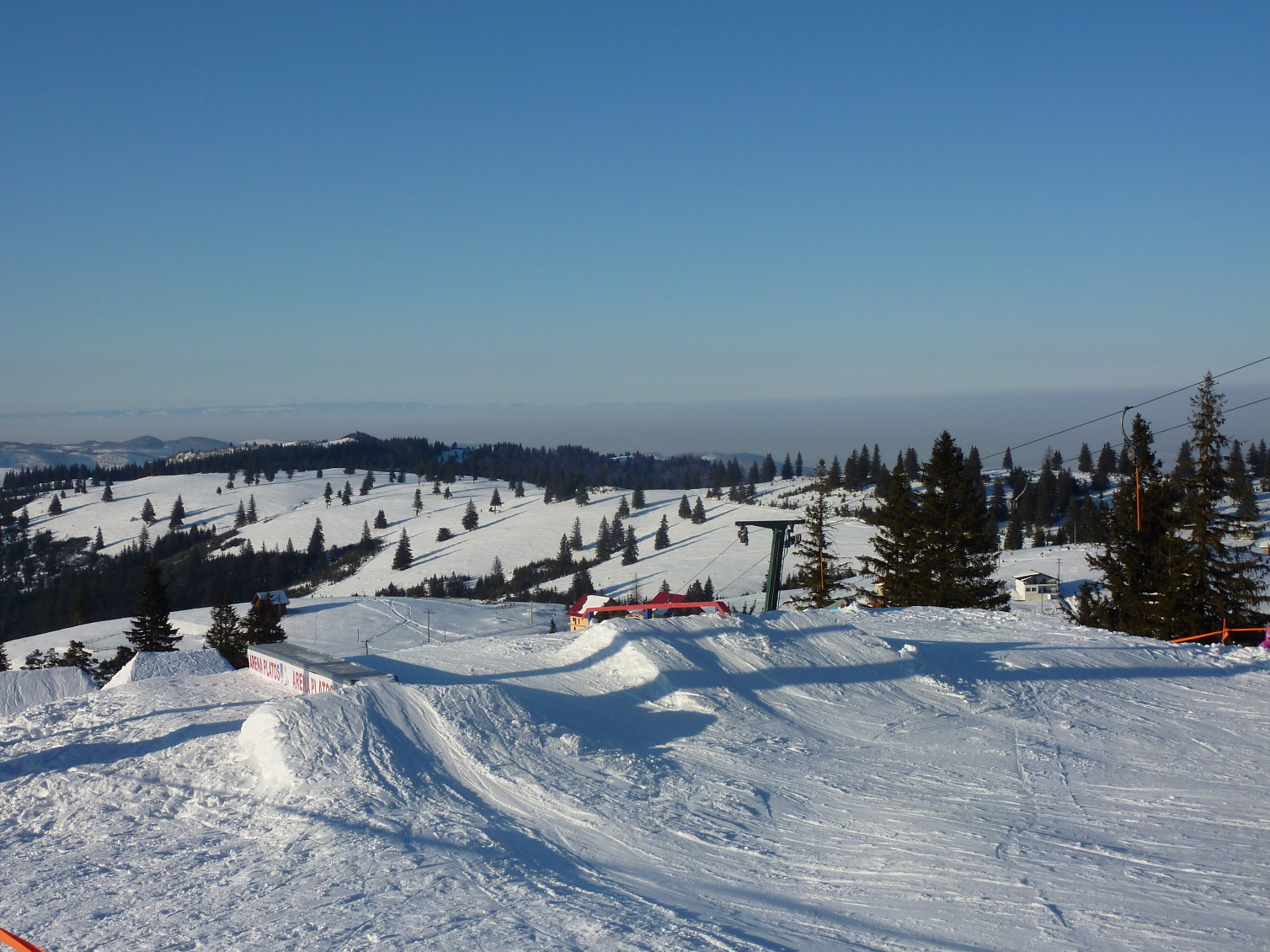
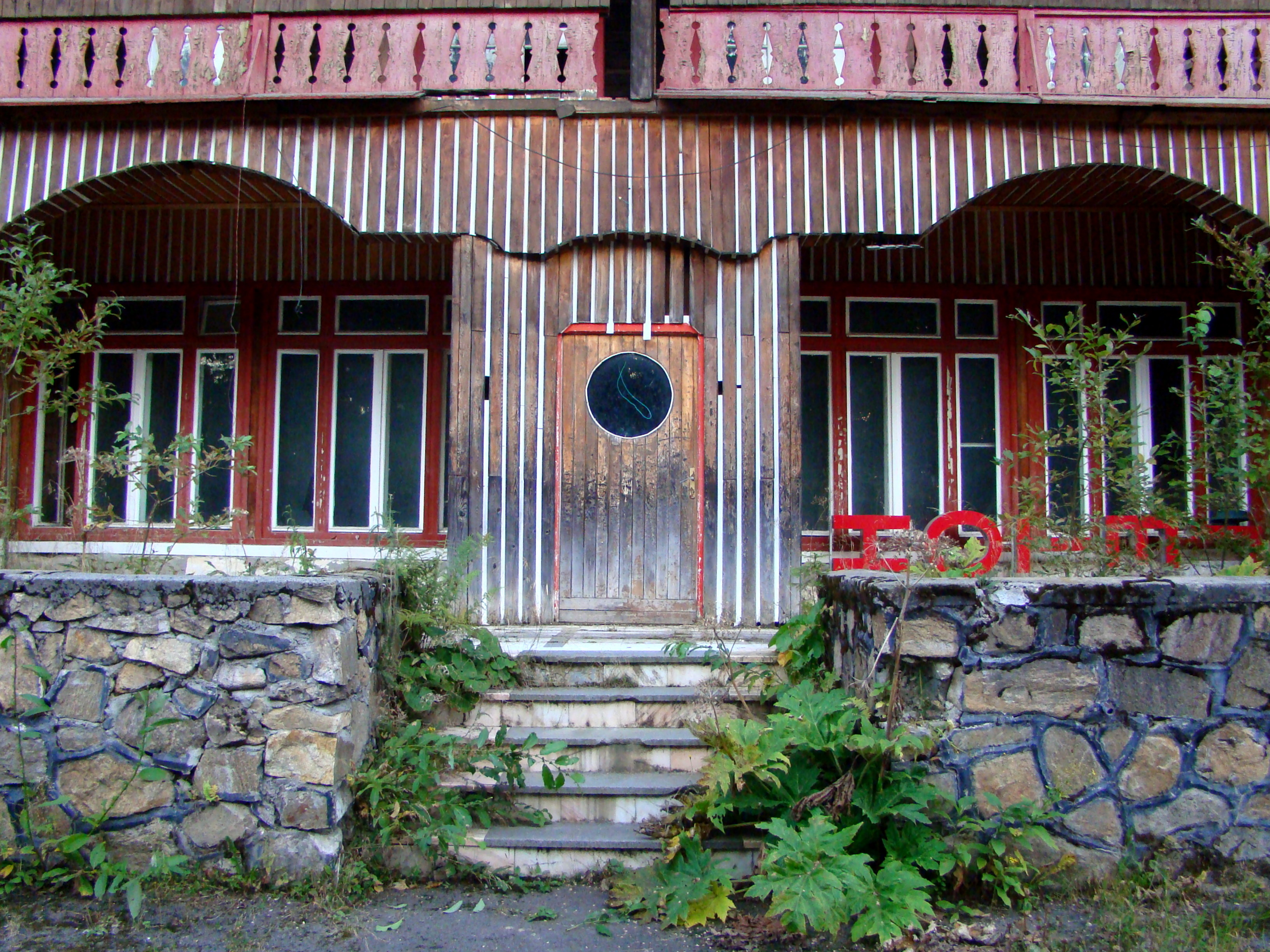
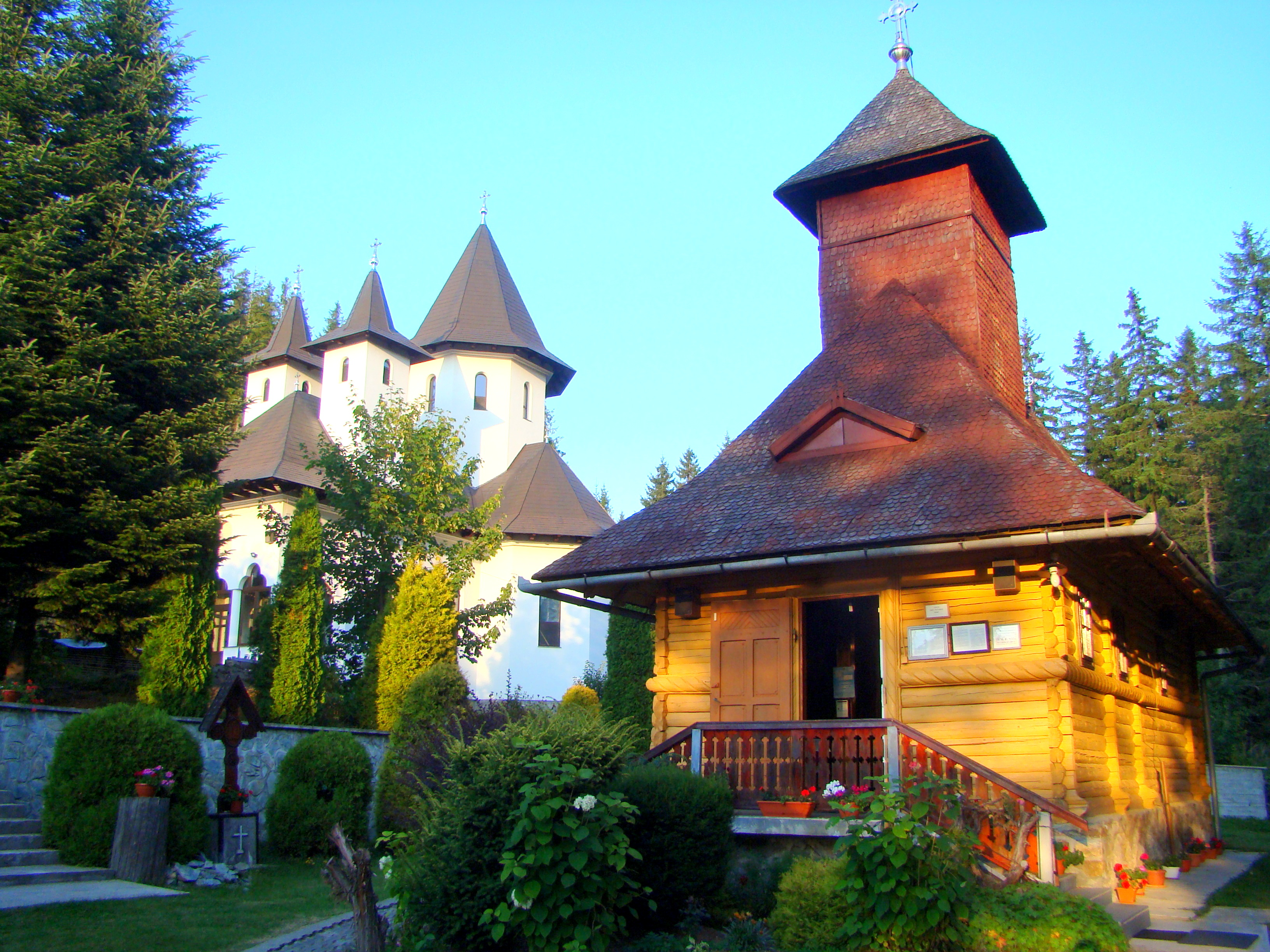
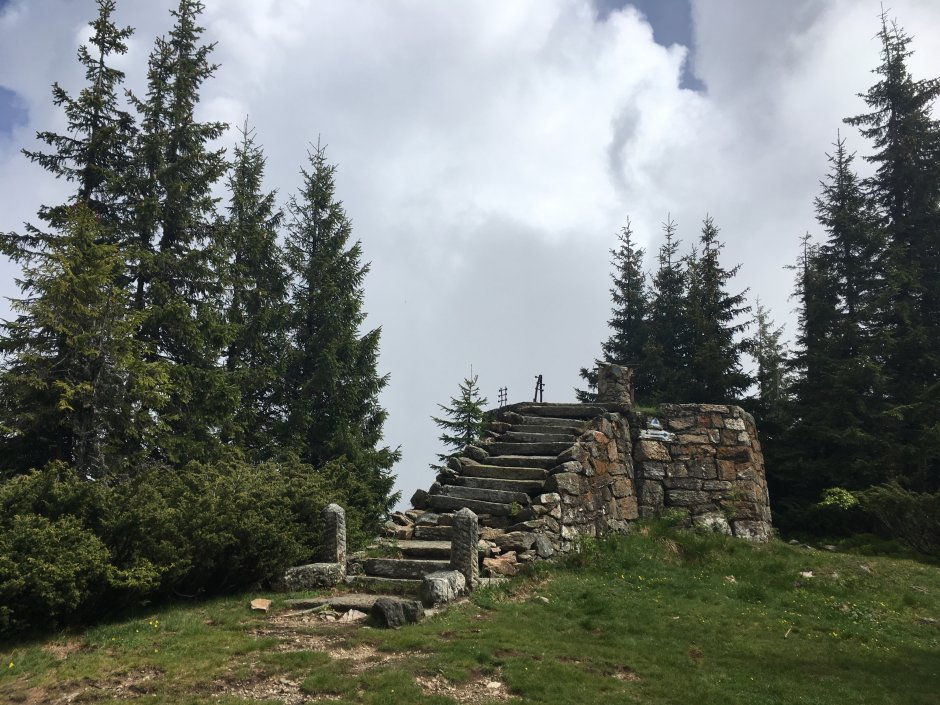
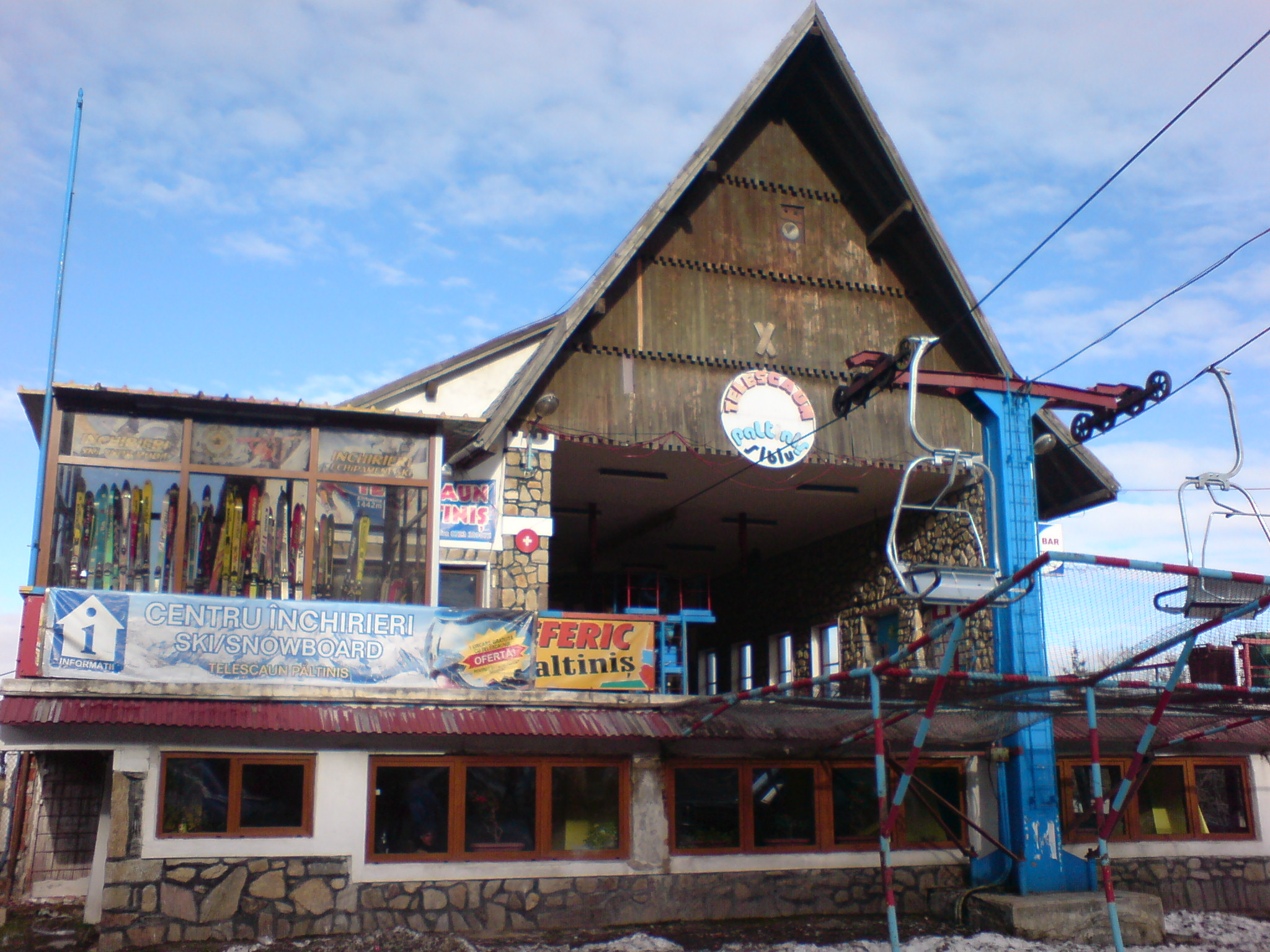
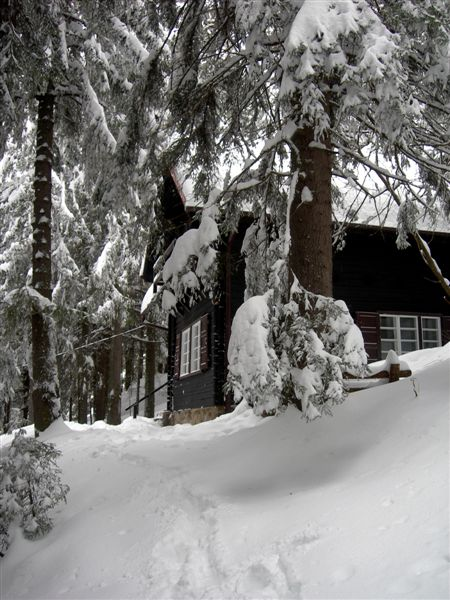
- Ski resort Casele de cură Păltiniș Hermitage Oncești Peak Chairlift station Noica house

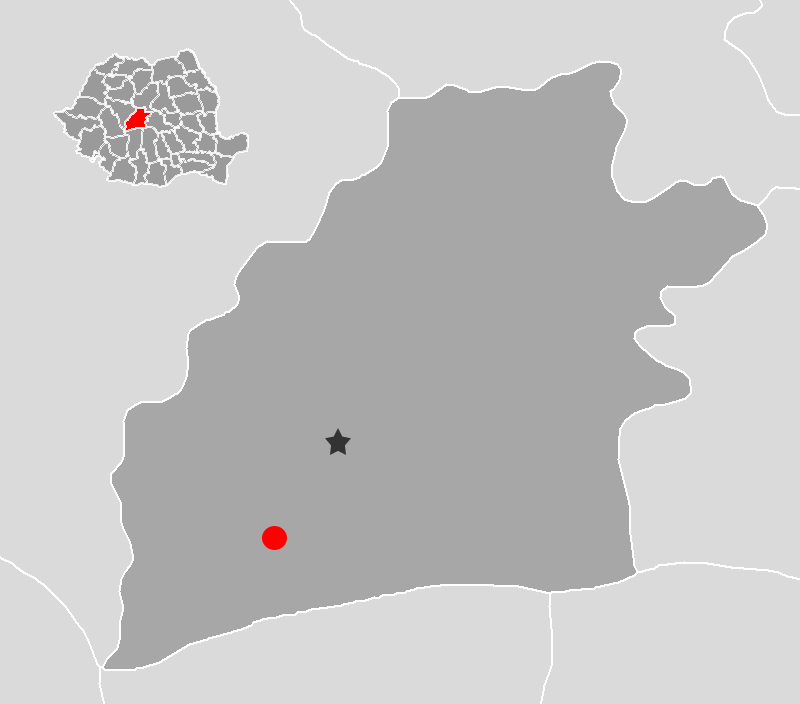
- Location within Sibiu County

- Location within Romania
- Coordinates: 45°40′58″N 23°59′01″E
- Country: Romania
- County: Sibiu County
- Elevation: 1,440 m (4,720 ft)
- Time zone: UTC+2 (EET)
  - Summer (DST): UTC+3 (EEST)
- Postal code: 550001
- Vehicle registration: SB
- Climate: ET
- Website: Paltinis Resort

Păltiniş (German: Hohe Rinne; Hungarian: Szebenjuharos) is a mountain resort in Transylvania, Romania, 35 km south-west from Sibiu in the Cindrel Mountains.

It is situated at 1440 m altitude, being the highest resort in Romania. It lies in a conifer forest. It is a popular winter destination and in summer it is sought for its peacefulness, fresh air and easily accessible trekking routes.

It was founded by an association – Siebenbuergischer Karpatenverein (S.K.V.) – in 1894 and three villas from that period still exist. Currently there are 4 hotels, 6 chalets and 17 villas and an increasing number of private holiday houses.

At the entrance to the resort, there is a Romanian Orthodox monastery, which houses the burial place of the Romanian philosopher Constantin Noica. Noica spent the last period of his life in Păltiniș and founded the Păltiniș School here.

Formally, it is a village administered by the city of Sibiu, although it lies on territory that is not contiguous with the city itself.

== Climate ==
Păltiniș features a typical alpine climate, with an average annual temperature of approximately 7 °C. July temperatures average 16 °C, while January temperatures hover around -3 °C. Precipitation is abundant, exceeding 1,000 mm annually; rainfall is frequent but short in duration. Snow cover persists for more than 120 days per year. Among its primary therapeutic assets is the alpine climate itself, characterized by clean air free of dust and allergens, high levels of ultraviolet radiation, and a strongly ionized atmosphere.

Climate data for Păltiniș (extremes 1981-present)
| Month | Jan | Feb | Mar | Apr | May | Jun | Jul | Aug | Sep | Oct | Nov | Dec | Year |
|---|---|---|---|---|---|---|---|---|---|---|---|---|---|
| Record high °C (°F) | 14.5 (58.1) | 17.5 (63.5) | 19.8 (67.6) | 24.8 (76.6) | 25.5 (77.9) | 28.6 (83.5) | 31.3 (88.3) | 30.7 (87.3) | 29.2 (84.6) | 23.1 (73.6) | 21.2 (70.2) | 16.9 (62.4) | 31.3 (88.3) |
| Mean daily maximum °C (°F) | 0.7 (33.3) | 2.5 (36.5) | 5.1 (41.2) | 9.5 (49.1) | 13.8 (56.8) | 19.0 (66.2) | 20.7 (69.3) | 20.9 (69.6) | 16.2 (61.2) | 11.5 (52.7) | 6.8 (44.2) | 2.5 (36.5) | 10.8 (51.4) |
| Daily mean °C (°F) | −2.8 (27.0) | −1.2 (29.8) | 1.2 (34.2) | 5.2 (41.4) | 9.5 (49.1) | 14.4 (57.9) | 16.0 (60.8) | 16.2 (61.2) | 12.1 (53.8) | 7.5 (45.5) | 3.4 (38.1) | −0.6 (30.9) | 6.7 (44.1) |
| Mean daily minimum °C (°F) | −6.3 (20.7) | −4.9 (23.2) | −2.7 (27.1) | 0.9 (33.6) | 5.1 (41.2) | 9.8 (49.6) | 11.3 (52.3) | 11.6 (52.9) | 7.9 (46.2) | 3.5 (38.3) | -0.0 (32.0) | −3.8 (25.2) | 2.7 (36.9) |
| Record low °C (°F) | −33.8 (−28.8) | −19.8 (−3.6) | −22.8 (−9.0) | −13.0 (8.6) | −4.2 (24.4) | 0.3 (32.5) | 2.6 (36.7) | 2.0 (35.6) | −3.2 (26.2) | −13.5 (7.7) | −17.0 (1.4) | −20.1 (−4.2) | −33.8 (−28.8) |
| Average precipitation mm (inches) | 53.6 (2.11) | 49.8 (1.96) | 65.5 (2.58) | 95.5 (3.76) | 138.3 (5.44) | 158.2 (6.23) | 161.2 (6.35) | 106.2 (4.18) | 70.3 (2.77) | 65.7 (2.59) | 58.6 (2.31) | 57.7 (2.27) | 1,080.6 (42.55) |
| Average precipitation days (≥ 1.0 mm) | 9.7 | 8.6 | 9.3 | 10.9 | 14.6 | 13.7 | 12.5 | 9.4 | 8.7 | 8.2 | 8.9 | 9.3 | 123.8 |
Source: Meteomanz (2014-2026); Infoclimat (1980-2017)
