= Ideciu de Jos =

- Commune
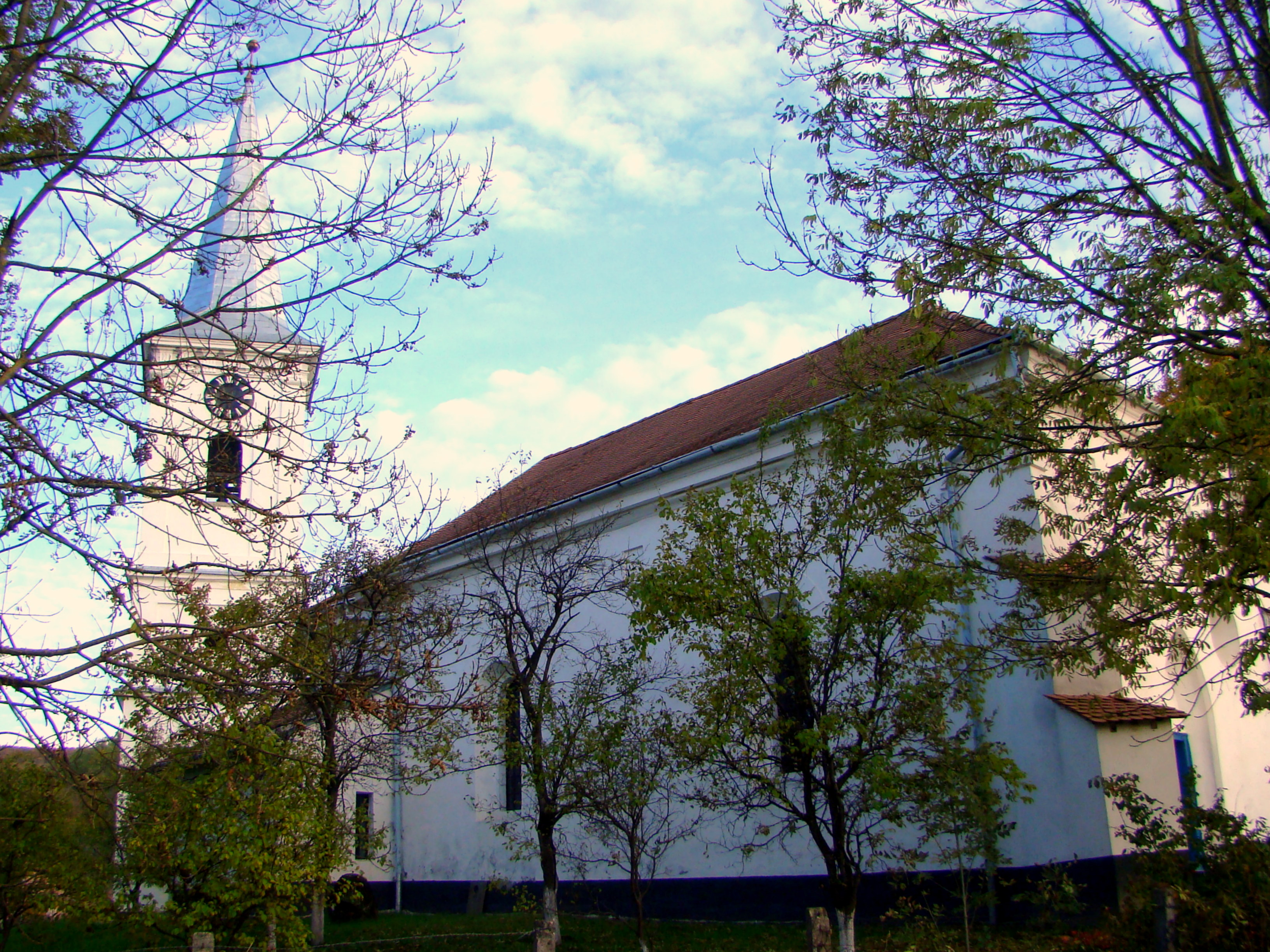
- Lutheran church in Ideciu de Sus

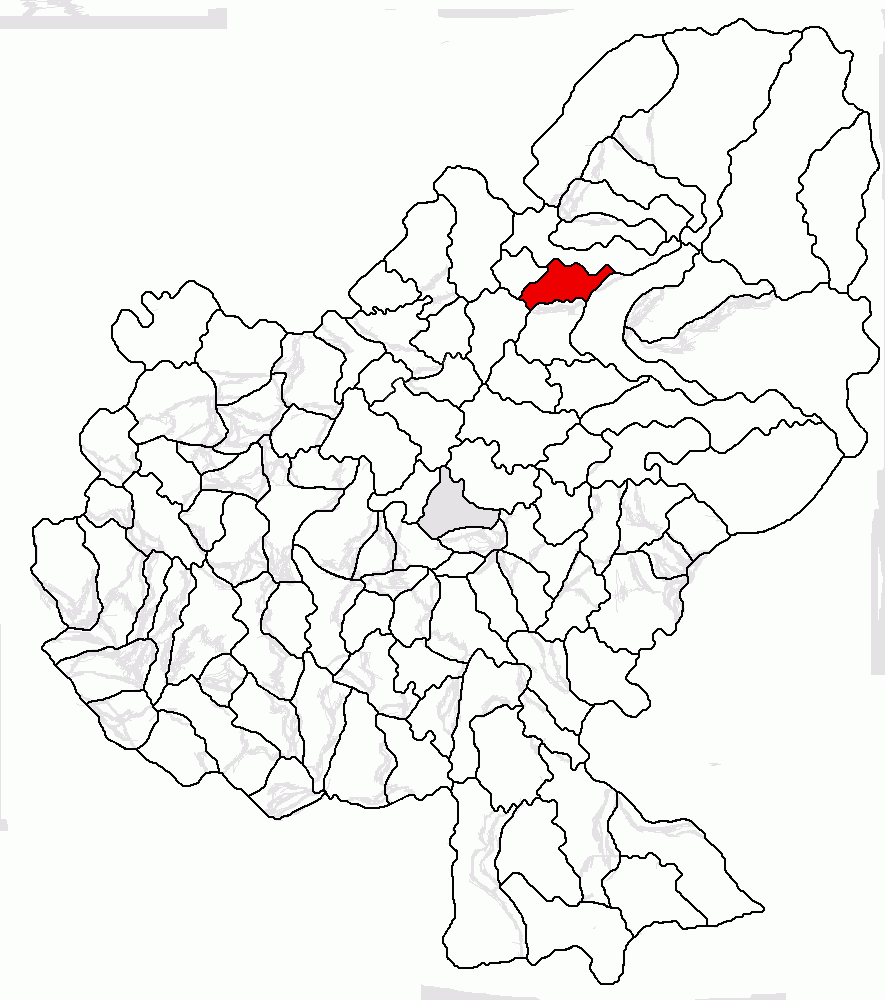
- Location in Mureș County

- Location in Romania
- Coordinates: 46°48′N 24°45′E
- Country: Romania
- County: Mureș

Government
  - Mayor (2020–2024): Lucian-Laurean Feier (PNL)
- Area: 42.70 km^{2} (16.49 sq mi)
- Elevation: 381 m (1,250 ft)
- Population (2021-12-01): 1,998
  - Density: 46.79/km^{2} (121.2/sq mi)
- Time zone: UTC+02:00 (EET)
  - Summer (DST): UTC+03:00 (EEST)
- Postal code: 547360
- Area code: (+40) 02 65
- Vehicle reg.: MS
- Website: ideciudejos.ro

Ideciu de Jos (Hungarian: Alsóidecs, Hungarian pronunciation: [ˈɒlʃoːidɛtʃ]) is a commune in Mureș County, Transylvania, Romania. It is composed of three villages: Deleni (Oroszidecs), Ideciu de Jos, and Ideciu de Sus (Felsőidecs). The route of the Via Transilvanica long-distance trail passes through the villages of Ideciu de Sus and Deleni.

== Demographics ==
Historical population
| Year | Pop. | ±% |
|---|---|---|
| 1850 | 2,018 | — |
| 1920 | 2,714 | +34.5% |
| 1941 | 3,005 | +10.7% |
| 1956 | 2,094 | −30.3% |
| 2002 | 2,005 | −4.3% |
| 2011 | 2,019 | +0.7% |
| 2021 | 1,998 | −1.0% |
Source: Census data

At the 2021 census, the commune had a population of 1,998, of which 86.29% were Romanians and 4.4% Hungarians.

== See also ==
- List of Hungarian exonyms (Mureș County)
