= Monica Lovinescu =

Romanian essayist

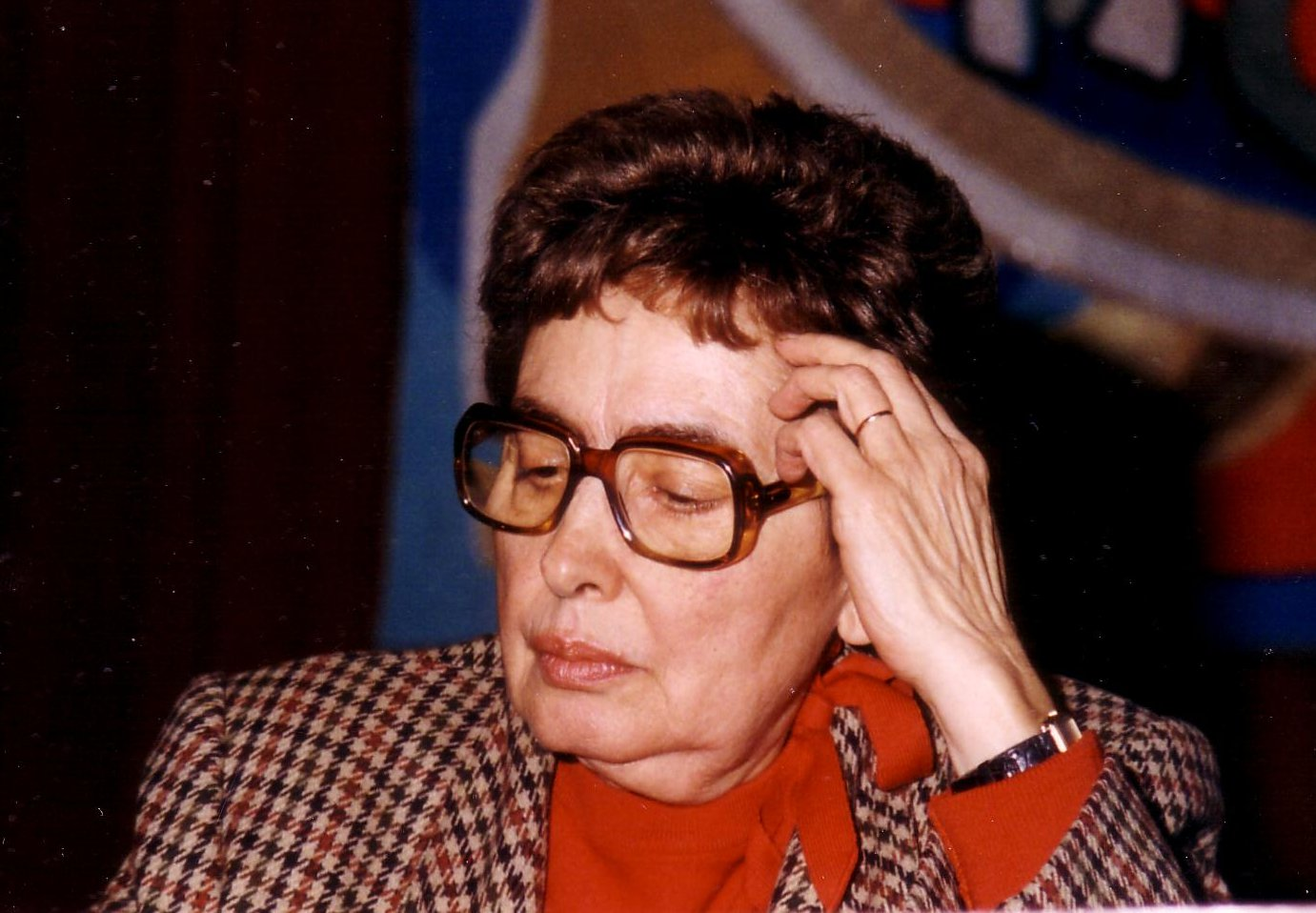
Lovinescu in 1994

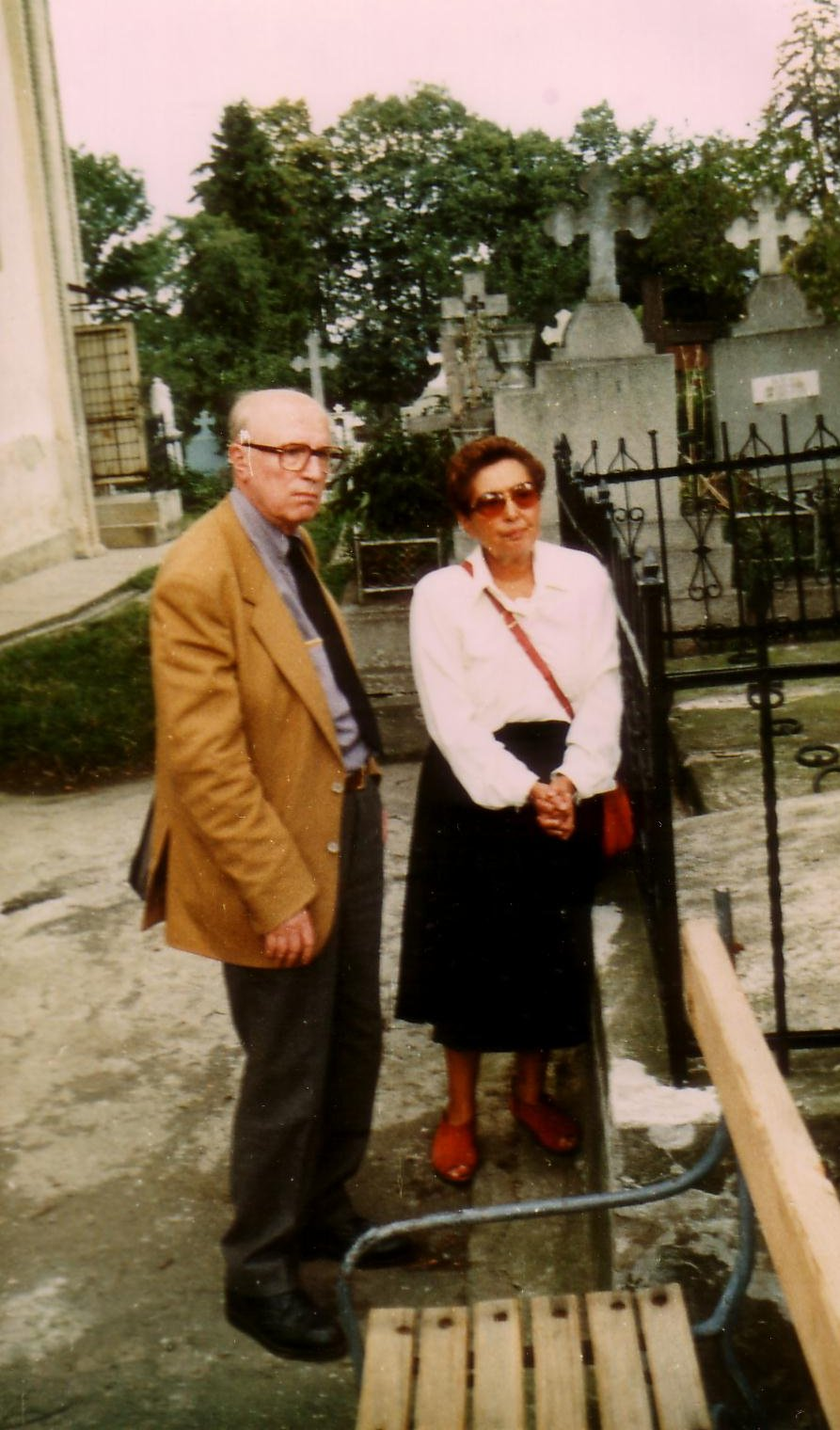
Lovinescu with Virgil Ierunca in 1993

Monica Lovinescu (Romanian pronunciation: [moˈnika loviˈnesku]; 19 November 1923 – 20 April 2008) was a Romanian essayist, short story writer, literary critic, translator, and journalist, noted for her activities as an opponent of the Romanian Communist regime. She published several works under the pseudonyms Monique Saint-Come and Claude Pascal. She is the daughter of literary figure Eugen Lovinescu. She was married to the literary critic Virgil Ierunca.

Lovinescu was born in Bucharest. A graduate of the University of Bucharest's Faculty of Letters, she made her literary debut in Vremea magazine, regularly publishing prose works in Revista Fundațiilor Regale and theater chronicles in Democrația. The rapid steps undertaken towards the establishing of an overtly communist rule in Romania motivated her to take refuge in France: going there on a French government-sponsored scholarship in September 1947, she asked (in August 1948) for political asylum after Romania became a People's Republic.

She published extensively on the subject of communism in her country, as well as works on Romanian literature. Her articles were frequently featured in prestigious magazines such as Kontinent, Les Cahiers de l'Est, and L'Alternative. She contributed the Romanian chapter of the collection of essays titled Histoire des spectacles (published by Éditions Gallimard).

Between 1951 and 1974, Lovinescu was a contributor for Romanian language broadcasts of the Radiodiffusion Française, as well as a member of the station's staff for Eastern Europe. From the 1960s onwards, she was a journalist for Radio Free Europe, creating two weekly pieces that were influential in generating an internal opposition to the Nicolae Ceaușescu regime. Their main purpose was to inform Romanians of cultural and political trends on in the "Free World". Part of the broadcast scripts were published as Unde Scurte ("Shortwaves"), in Madrid (1978). Her weekly radio shows, Theses and Antitheses in Paris (Teze și antiteze la Paris) and Romanian Cultural Current Affairs (Actualitatea culturală românească), spoken with a hoarse but warm and friendly voice, were followed with interest and with a glimmer of hope by many Romanians who, from beyond the Iron Curtain, were secretly listening to Radio Free Europe.

She was the target of violent attacks in the Romanian communist press, the most notable of them being carried out by journalists Eugen Barbu and Corneliu Vadim Tudor. Romanian defector Ion Mihai Pacepa claimed that in 1977 she was severely beaten by three Palestine Liberation Organization officers, one disguised as a French mailman, allegedly at the direction of Ceaușescu.

Lovinescu also translated several Romanian literary works into French.

She died in Paris.

In December 2023, a monumental ensemble featuring statues of Lovinescu and Ierunca united by a stainless steel mantle, next to a tree of evil (a parable of the Securitate agents that had infiltrated Radio Free Europe) was inaugurated in the Cotroceni neighborhood of Bucharest.
