= Pârteștii de Jos =

- Commune
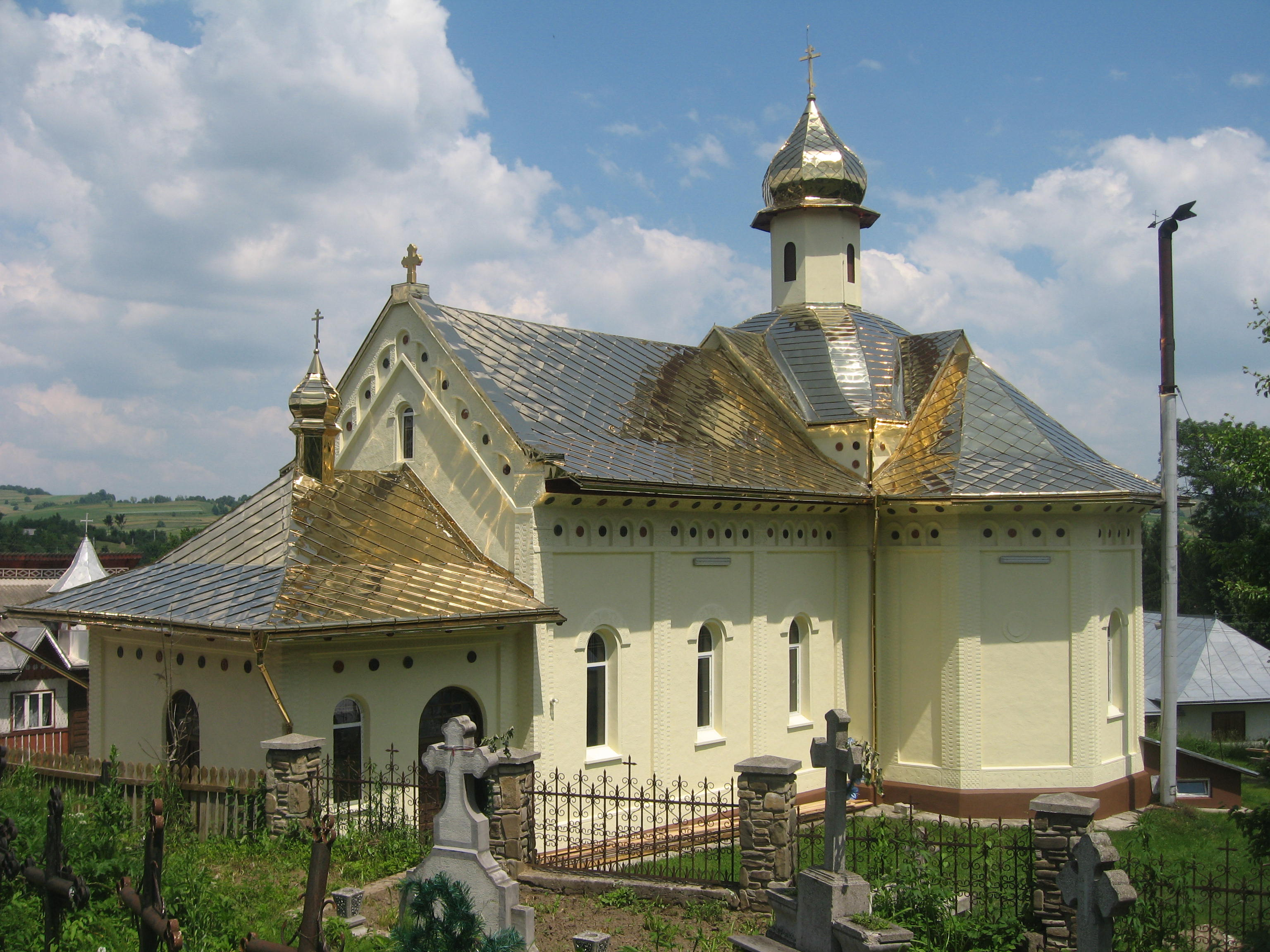
- Saint Nicholas Church in Pârteștii de Jos

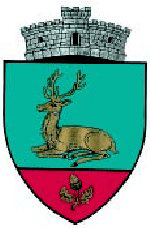
- Coat of arms

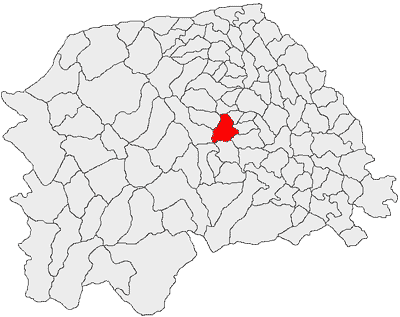
- Location in Suceava County

- Location in Romania
- Coordinates: 47°38′N 25°58′E
- Country: Romania
- County: Suceava

Government
  - Mayor (2020–2024): Mircea-Andrei Strugariu (PSD)
- Area: 51.27 km^{2} (19.80 sq mi)
- Elevation: 372 m (1,220 ft)
- Population (2021-12-01): 2,519
  - Density: 49.13/km^{2} (127.3/sq mi)
- Time zone: UTC+02:00 (EET)
  - Summer (DST): UTC+03:00 (EEST)
- Postal code: 727425
- Area code: +(40) 230
- Vehicle reg.: SV
- Website: www.comunapirtestiidejos.ro

Pârteștii de Jos (German: Unter Pertestie) is a commune located in Suceava County, Romania. It is composed of four villages: Deleni, Pârteștii de Jos, Varvata, and Vârfu Dealului.
